= Drowning Pool discography =

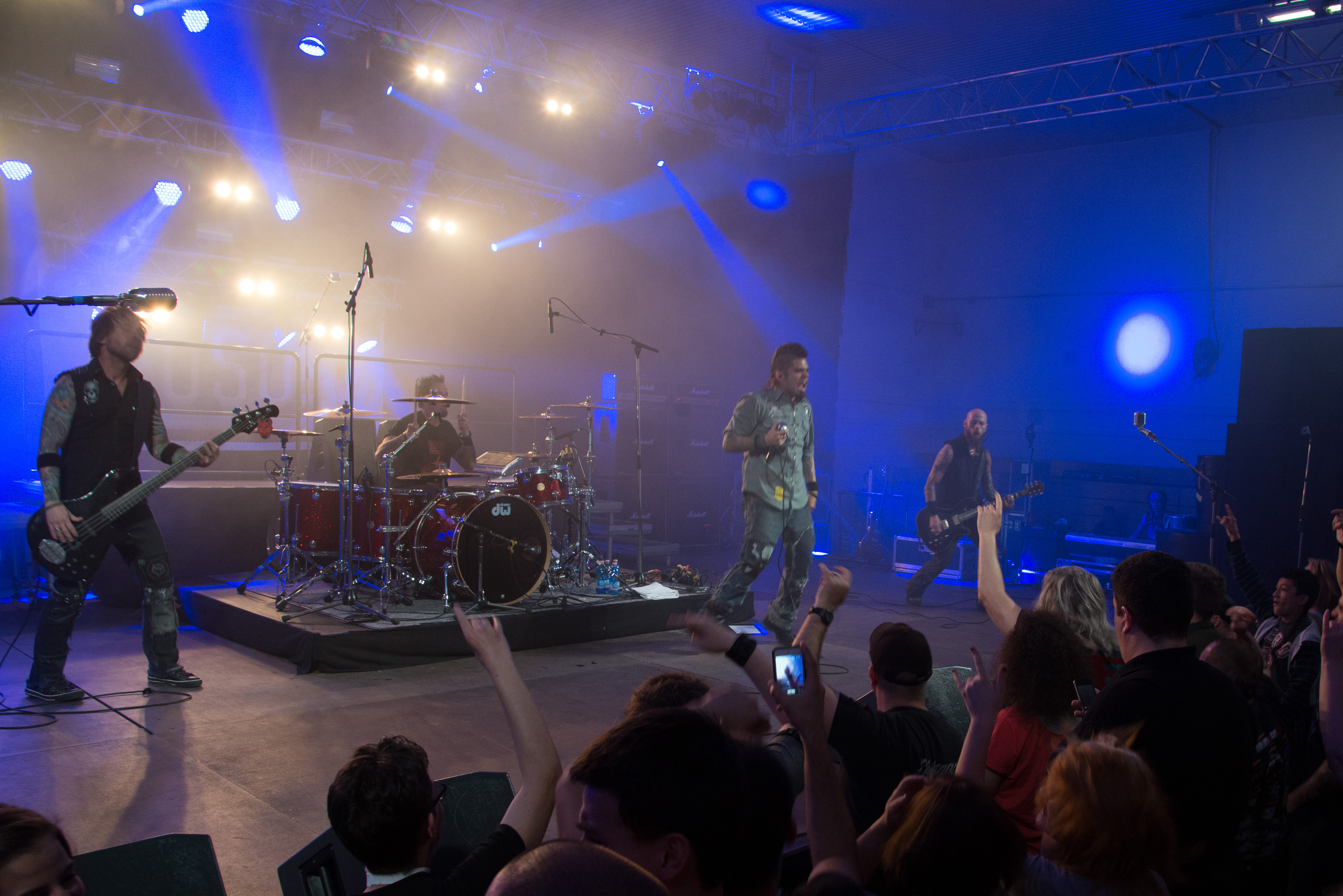
- Drowning Pool performing in 2013
- Studio albums: 7
- Extended plays: 2
- Live albums: 1
- Singles: 20
- Video albums: 1
- Music videos: 15

The discography of Drowning Pool, an American rock band, consists of seven studio albums, one live album, one video album, one extended play, twenty singles and fifteen music videos.

== Albums ==
=== Studio albums ===
List of studio albums, with selected chart positions and certifications
Title	Album details	Peak chart positions						Certifications
Title	Album details	US	US Hard Rock	US Rock	AUS	NZ	UK	Certifications
Sinner	Released: June 5, 2001 (US); Label: Wind-up; Formats: CD, cassette, digital download	14	—	—	73	18	70	RIAA: Platinum; BPI: Silver; RMNZ: Gold
Desensitized	Released: April 20, 2004 (US); Label: Wind-up; Formats: CD, digital download	17	—	—	62	—	66	
Full Circle	Released: August 7, 2007 (US); Label: Eleven Seven; Formats: CD, digital download	64	9	19	—	—	—	
Drowning Pool	Released: April 27, 2010 (US); Label: Eleven Seven; Formats: CD, digital download	35	3	10	—	—	—	
Resilience	Released: April 9, 2013 (US); Label: Eleven Seven; Formats: CD, digital download	72	6	22	—	—	—	
Hellelujah	Released: February 5, 2016 (US); Label: eOne; Formats: CD, digital download	—	6	20	—	—	—	
Strike a Nerve	Released: September 30, 2022 (US); Label: Universal; Formats: Vinyl, CD, digital download	—	—	—	—	—	—	
"—" denotes a recording that did not chart or was not released in that territory.

=== Live albums ===
List of live albums
Title	Album details
Loudest Common Denominator	Released: March 3, 2009 (US); Label: Eleven Seven; Formats: CD, digital download

=== Video albums ===
List of video albums
Title	Album details	Notes
Sinema	Released: November 19, 2002 (US); Label: Wind-up; Formats: DVD	Contains more than two-and-a-half hours of concert footage, including the band's appearances at the 2001 and 2002 Ozzfest summer music festivals.

== Extended plays ==
List of extended plays
Title	Details
Drowning Pool	Released: 1999 (US); Label: Pounding Drool Music; Formats: CD
Pieces of Nothing	Released: 2000 (US); Label: Crystal Clear Sound; Formats: CD

== Singles ==
List of singles, with selected chart positions and certifications, showing year released and album name
Title	Year	Peak chart positions						Certifications	Album
Title	Year	US Bub.	US Alt.	US Heri. Rock	US Main. Rock	US Rock	UK	Certifications	Album
"Bodies"	2001	19	12	—	6	×	34	RIAA: Platinum; BPI: Platinum	Sinner
"Sinner"	2001	—	36	—	28	×	—		Sinner
"Tear Away"	2002	—	37	—	18	×	65		Sinner
"Step Up"	2004	—	—	—	7	×	79		Desensitized
"Love and War"	2004	—	—	—	21	×	—		Desensitized
"Killin' Me"	2004	—	—	—	28	×	—		Desensitized
"Soldiers"	2007	—	—	—	20	×	—		Full Circle
"Enemy"	2007	—	—	—	20	×	—		Full Circle
"37 Stitches"	2008	—	—	—	5	42	—		Full Circle
"White Trash Circus" (with Mötley Crüe, Godsmack, Theory of a Deadman and Charm City Devils)	2009	—	—	—	37	—	—		Saints of Los Angeles
"Shame"	2009	—	—	—	26	—	—		Full Circle
"Feel Like I Do"	2010	—	—	7	4	18	—		Drowning Pool
"Turn So Cold"	2010	—	—	18	8	25	—		Drowning Pool
"Let the Sin Begin"	2011	—	—	—	—	—	—		Drowning Pool
"In Memory Of..."	2012	—	—	—	—	—	—		Resilience
"Saturday Night"	2012	—	—	—	33	—	—		Resilience
"One Finger and a Fist"	2013	—	—	—	29	—	—		Resilience
"Anytime Anyplace"	2013	—	—	—	—	—	—		Resilience
"By the Blood"	2015	—	—	—	33	—	—		Hellelujah
"Snake Charmer"	2015	—	—	—	—	—	—		Hellelujah
"Hell to Pay"	2016	—	—	—	—	—	—		Hellelujah
"Mind Right"	2022	—	—	—	—	—	—		Strike a Nerve
"Choke"	2022	—	—	—	—	—	—		Strike a Nerve
"A Devil More Damned"	2022	—	—	—	—	—	—		Strike a Nerve
"Revolution (The Final Amen)"	2024	—	—	—	—	—	—		TBA
"Madness"	2025	—	—	—	—	—	—		TBA
"The Wrong One" (with Sorry X)	2026	—	—	—	—	—	—		TBA
"—" denotes a recording that did not chart or was not released in that territory. "×" denotes periods where charts did not exist or were not archived.

== Music videos ==
List of music videos, showing year released and directors
Title	Year	Director
"Bodies"	2001	Paul Hunter
"Sinner"	2001	Gregory Dark
"Tear Away"	2002	Glen Bennett
"Step Up"	2004	Charles Jensen
"Killin' Me"	2005	Glen Bennett
"Soldiers"	2007	Lizzie Palmer
"Enemy"	2007	Unknown
"37 Stitches"	2008	Robin Davey
"Shame"	2009	Matt Cooper
"Feel Like I Do"	2010	Matt Cooper
"Turn So Cold"	2010	Matt Cooper
"Let the Sin Begin"	2011	Matt Cooper
"Saturday Night"	2012	Jonathan Bertorelli
"One Finger and a Fist"	2013	Jonathan Bertorelli
"By the Blood"	2016	Daniel Wanghorn
"Revolution (The Final Amen)"	2024	CaliberTV

== Guest appearances ==
List of non-single guest appearances, showing year released and album name
Title	Year	Album
"Break You"	2002	The Scorpion King soundtrack
"Creeping Death" (live)	2002	Ozzfest 2002
"The Game"	2002	WWF: Forceable Entry
"The Man Without Fear" (featuring Rob Zombie)	2003	Daredevil: The Album
"Rise Up!"	2004	WWE ThemeAddict: The Music, Vol. 6
"Rise Up 2006"	2006	WWE: Wreckless Intent
"No More"	2006	Saw III soundtrack
