= Loudest Common Denominator =

Live album by Drowning Pool
- Released: March 3, 2009
- Recorded: 2008 in San Diego, California
- Genre: Alternative metal; nu metal
- Length: 57:19
- Label: Eleven Seven
- Producer: Drowning Pool

Drowning Pool chronology
Full Circle (2007)	Loudest Common Denominator (2009)	Drowning Pool (2010)

Professional ratings
Review scores
Source	Rating
AllMusic	2.5/5 stars

Loudest Common Denominator is a live album by American rock band Drowning Pool, and was recorded in San Diego. It was released on March 3, 2009. On February 4, 2009, Eleven Seven Music released a video on YouTube of the band revealing details of the album. These details included the album having acoustic versions of both "37 Stitches" and "Shame". On February 5, 2009, Drowning Pool announced on their official website the track listings of the album; they also revealed the cover of the album.

== Track listing ==
All songs written by Drowning Pool.

No.	Title	Original release	Length
1.	"Sinner"	Sinner	2:49
2.	"Full Circle"	Full Circle	3:11
3.	"Enemy"	Full Circle	3:34
4.	"Step Up"	Desensitized	3:45
5.	"Shame"	Full Circle	3:14
6.	"Reminded"	Sinner	3:41
7.	"Soldiers"	Full Circle	5:45
8.	"Reborn"	Full Circle	4:12
9.	"Pity"	Sinner	3:49
10.	"Bodies"	Sinner	10:02
11.	"Tear Away"	Sinner	5:03
12.	"37 Stitches" (acoustic demo) (bonus track)	previously unreleased	3:46
13.	"Shame" (acoustic demo) (bonus track)	previously unreleased	4:25
Total length:			57:19

== Personnel ==
Drowning Pool

- Ryan McCombs – vocals
- Stevie Benton – bass, backup vocals
- C. J. Pierce – guitar, backup vocals
- Mike Luce – drums, backup vocals

Production

- Produced by Drowning Pool
- Tracks 1–11 recorded live in San Diego, mixed by Tye Robison
- Track 12 recorded and mixed by Tye Robison at January Sound Studio, Dallas, Texas
- Track 13 produced, engineered and mixed by D. Braxton Henry for 379 Productions
- Mastered by Dave Donnelly at DNA Mastering
- Live photos by Nathan W. Stahly and Larry Perez
- Insert images by Michelle Overson
- Packaging design by Trevor Niemann at Visual Entropy
- Illustrations by Lisa Niemann at Toxic Pretty
