= AM Conspiracy discography =

This is a discography of American alternative metal band AM Conspiracy currently consists of one studio album, one EP and three singles.

== Studio albums ==
Year	Album details	Peak chart positions			Certifications (sales thresholds)
Year	Album details	U.S.	US Rock	Us Heat	Certifications (sales thresholds)
2010	AM Conspiracy: Released: January 12, 2010; Label: Burnhill Union Records; Format: CD	—	—	—	

== EP ==
Year	Album details	Peak chart positions			Certifications (sales thresholds)
Year	Album details	U.S.	US Rock	Us Heat	Certifications (sales thresholds)
2007	Out of the Shallow End: Released: August 2007; Label: None; Format: CD	—	—	—	

== Singles ==
Year	Single	Peak chart positions				Album
Year	Single	US	US Main	US Alt	US Rock	Album
2007	"Far"	—	—	—	—	Out of the Shallow End EP
2009	"Welt"	—	—	—	—	AM Conspiracy
2010	"Pictures"	—	—	—	—	AM Conspiracy
"—" denotes releases that did not chart or not certified " " denotes charts were not created the same time the single was released

== Song appearances in media and soundtracks ==
- In 2007, AM Conspiracy contributed two songs, "Right on Time" and "Welt", to the video game WWE Smackdown vs Raw 2008.
- In 2009, AM Conspiracy contributed two songs, "Welt" and the unreleased "High", to the film Bitch Slap.
