= Disclaimer II =

Studio album by Seether
- Released: 15 June 2004
- Genres: Post-grunge; alternative metal; nu metal
- Length: 72:57
- Label: Wind-up
- Producers: Jay Baumgardner; Bob Marlette

Seether chronology
Disclaimer (2002)	Disclaimer II (2004)	Karma and Effect (2005)

Singles from Disclaimer II
- 1. "Broken" Released: 19 April 2004

Professional ratings
Review scores
Source	Rating
AllMusic	3/5 stars
Ultimate Guitar Archive	10/10 stars

Disclaimer II is the second studio album by South African rock band Seether. It is a recompilation of the band's debut studio album, Disclaimer (2002). Although the 12 tracks from the original album are present, they were slightly remixed and differ from the original. Also, the majority of the remixed tracks feature additional lead guitar melodies with the addition of a permanent lead guitarist to the band's line-up prior to the release of the album. This is also the first Seether album to feature contributions from their current drummer John Humphrey. In Europe, the album includes four tracks more than its predecessor; in the United States, the album has eight extra tracks, some of which had been previously released on soundtracks, such as "Hang On," which had been featured on the 2003 Daredevil soundtrack and "Out of My Way," which had been featured on the soundtrack to the 2003 horror film Freddy vs. Jason,

WWE would also use "Out of My Way" as an entrace music for his Wrestler Zach Gowen and "Sold Me" as the theme song for his June Pay-Per-View WWE Bad Blood (2004), which was aired on June 13 (2 days before the release of the album)

A primary reason for the reworking of Disclaimer was the popularity of "Broken". Originally a simple acoustic ballad, it was remade into an electric, duet version with vocals by Evanescence frontwoman Amy Lee, who was dating Seether frontman Shaun Morgan at the time. This new version was originally featured on the 2004 Punisher soundtrack and had an accompanying music video. Both the US and European releases include the new rendition of "Broken", and Disclaimer II subsequently became Seether's most successful album commercially. The song "Take Me Away" is an acoustic version of a track from their first independent album (originally as Saron Gas), Fragile (2000).

== Track listing ==
All tracks are written by Shaun Welgemoed and Dale Stewart, except where noted.

Standard version
No.	Title	Writer(s)	Length
1.	"Gasoline"		2:49
2.	"69 Tea"	Welgemoed	3:32
3.	"Fine Again"		4:05
4.	"Needles"		3:26
5.	"Driven Under"		4:33
6.	"Pride"		4:07
7.	"Sympathetic"		4:11
8.	"Your Bore"		3:58
9.	"Fade Away"		3:53
10.	"Pig"	Welgemoed	3:30
11.	"Fuck It"		2:57
12.	"Broken"		4:18
13.	"Sold Me"		3:41
14.	"Got It Made"		5:10
15.	"Cigarettes"		3:12
16.	"Broken" (featuring Amy Lee)		4:18

Deluxe version
No.	Title	Writer(s)	Length
14.	"Cigarettes"		3:11
15.	"Love Her"		4:12
16.	"Take Me Away"		3:56
17.	"Got It Made"		5:10
18.	"Out of My Way"	James A. Johnston; Welgemoed; Stewart	3:52
19.	"Hang On"		3:11
20.	"Broken" (featuring Amy Lee)		4:18
Total length:			72:57

- Note: Tracks 1–12 originally appeared on Disclaimer, albeit with slightly different mixes.

== Personnel ==
Credits adapted from album's liner notes.

Seether

- Shaun Morgan – guitars, lead vocals
- Dale Stewart – bass, backing vocals
- Pat Callahan – additional guitars
- John Humphrey – drums (tracks 13–17, 20)

Additional musicians

- Josh Freese – drums (tracks 1–12)
- Dave Cohoe – drums (track 18)
- Nick Oshiro – drums (track 19)
- Amy Lee – vocals, string arrangement (track 20)
- Double G – string arrangement (track 20)

Production

- Jay Baumgardner – production (tracks 1–12, 19, 20), mixing (track 19)
- Jon Berkowitz – assistant mix engineering
- Dan Certa – engineering
- Alex Gibson – strings engineering (track 20)
- Emily Lazar – mastering
- Bob Marlette – production, engineering (tracks 13–17, 20), mixing (tracks 1–17, 20)
- Jeff Moses – assistant engineering
- Jeremy Parker – assistant engineering
- Sid Riggs – Pro Tools recording engineering (tracks 13–17, 20), Pro Tools mix engineering
- Ulrich Wild – production, mixing (track 18)

== Charts ==
Chart (2004)	Peak position
Australian Albums (ARIA)	38
Austrian Albums (Ö3 Austria)	38
Canadian Albums (Billboard)	32
French Albums (SNEP)	145
German Albums (Offizielle Top 100)	43
New Zealand Albums (RMNZ)	12
Swiss Albums (Schweizer Hitparade)	53
UK Albums (OCC)	117
US Billboard 200	53

== Certifications ==
Region	Certification	Certified units/sales
Australia (ARIA)	Gold	35,000^{^}
Canada (Music Canada)	Gold	50,000^{^}
New Zealand (RMNZ)	Platinum	15,000^{‡}
United States (RIAA) Album	Platinum	1,000,000^{^}
United States (RIAA) Video	5× Platinum	500,000^{^}
^{^} Shipments figures based on certification alone.^{‡} Sales+streaming figures based on certification alone.
