= Feel Like I Do =

Single by Drowning Pool

from the album Drowning Pool
- Released: February 9, 2010
- Genre: Hard rock
- Length: 3:33
- Label: Eleven Seven
- Songwriters: Stevie Benton; Mike Luce; Ryan McCombs; C.J. Pierce

Drowning Pool singles chronology
"Shame" (2009)	"Feel Like I Do" (2010)	"Turn So Cold" (2010)

Music video
- "Feel Like I Do" on YouTube

"Feel Like I Do" is the first single from American rock band Drowning Pool's self-titled album. It was released to radio on February 9, 2010. It was used during the broadcast of the 2010 NFL draft on ESPN. It was also used as part of the soundtrack for Saints Row: The Third. "Feel Like I Do" is the highest-charting single by Drowning Pool to date, reaching #4 on the Billboard Hot Mainstream Rock Tracks chart, and surpassing "37 Stitches", which peaked at #5. It is the band's second top-5 hit on that chart.

== Music video ==
The music video for the song premiered on 20 January 2010. It features the band playing in a large white room with two small metal staircases on either side of a metal platform, with a smaller one in front of it which the drummer is seated on. Over the course of the video, groups of diverse people can be seen singing along during the chorus. The song ends with the groups surrounding the platform and dancing to the song. The music video also features a unique camera effect.

== Charts ==
Chart	Peak position
US Hot Mainstream Rock Tracks	4
US Rock Songs	18
