= The Punisher: The Album =

Soundtrack album by various artists
- Released: March 23, 2004
- Recorded: 2002–2003
- Genres: Nu metal; hard rock; post-grunge; alternative rock; alternative metal
- Length: 67:38
- Label: Wind-up

Singles from The Punisher: The Album
- 1. "Broken" Released: April 19, 2004; 2. "Step Up" Released: June 22, 2004

Professional ratings
Review scores
Source	Rating
AllMusic	2.5/5 stars
IGN	5.7/10 stars

The Punisher: The Album is the official soundtrack for the film The Punisher and was released in 2004 by Wind-up Records. Its two lead singles were "Broken" by Seether and Evanescence frontwoman Amy Lee and "Step Up" by Drowning Pool, which have accompanying music videos. However, they only appear in the end credits, whereas "In Time" by Mark Collie appears for a specific diner scene where Collie plays a hitman.

== Track listing ==
Credits adapted from the album's liner notes.

No.	Title	Writer(s)	Producer(s)	Length
1.	"Step Up" (Drowning Pool)	Stevie Benton; Jason Jones; Mike Luce; C. J. Pierce	Johnny K	3:18
2.	"Bleed" (Puddle of Mudd)	Wes Scantlin	John Kurzweg; Puddle of Mudd	3:34
3.	"Slow Motion" (Nickelback)	Nickelback	Nickelback; Joey Moi	3:32
4.	"Never Say Never" (Queens of the Stone Age)	Benjamin Bossi; Larry Carter; Debora Iyall; Peter Woods; Frank Zincavage	Josh Homme; Alain Johannes	4:23
5.	"Broken" (Seether featuring Amy Lee)	Shaun Welgemoed; Dale Stewart	Bob Marlette	4:18
6.	"Finding Myself" (Smile Empty Soul)	Sean Danielsen; John Lewis Parker; Smile Empty Soul	John Lewis Parker	3:29
7.	"Lost in a Portrait" (Trapt)	Chris Taylor Brown; Trapt	Trapt	4:41
8.	"Still Running" (Chevelle)	Pete Loeffler; Chevelle	Chevelle	3:11
9.	"Ashes to Ashes" (Damageplan featuring Jerry Cantrell)	Dimebag Darrell; Vinnie Paul; Jerry Cantrell; Patrick Lachman	Vinnie Paul; Dimebag Darrell; Sterling Winfield (co.); Patrick Lachman (co.)	5:04
10.	"Sold Me" (Seether)	Welgemoed; Stewart	Bob Marlette	3:40
11.	"Eyes Wired Shut" (Edgewater)	Matt Moseman; Ricky Wolking; Justin Middleton; Jeremy Rees; Micah Creel	Eric Delegard	3:14
12.	"Slow Chemical" (Finger Eleven)	Jim Johnston; Scott Anderson; James Black; Rich Beddoe; Sean Anderson; Rick Jackett	David Schiffman	3:19
13.	"The End Has Come" (Ben Moody featuring Jason C. Miller and Jason "Gong" Jones)	Ben Moody; Jason C. Miller; Lance Garvin	Jay Baumgardner	3:08
14.	"Piece by Piece" (Strata)	Hrag Chanchanian; Ryan Hernandez; Adrian Robison; Eric Victorino		3:38
15.	"Bound to Violence" (Hatebreed)	Jamey Jasta; Lou Richards; Chris Beattie; Sean Martin; Rigg Ross		2:23
16.	"Sick" (Seven Wiser)	Jon Santos; Santo Castellano	Sandy Thomas	3:05
17.	"Complicated" (Submersed)	Donald Carpenter; Eric Friedman	Kirk Kelsey; Mark Tremonti	3:08
18.	"Time for People" (Atomship)	Nathan Slade; Chad Kent; Joey Culver; Derek Pardoe	Dave Fortman	3:44
19.	"In Time" (Mark Collie)	Coley McCabe Collie; Mark Collie	David Thoener	2:45
Total length:				67:39

== Certifications ==
Region	Certification	Certified units/sales
United States (RIAA)	Gold	500,000^{^}
^{^} Shipments figures based on certification alone.
