= Turn So Cold =

Single by Drowning Pool

from the album Drowning Pool
- Released: July 19, 2010
- Genre: Alternative metal
- Length: 3:38
- Label: Eleven Seven
- Songwriters: Stevie Benton; Mike Luce; Ryan McCombs; C.J. Pierce; Bobby Huff

Drowning Pool singles chronology
"Feel Like I Do" (2010)	"Turn So Cold" (2010)	"Saturday Night" (2012)

Music video
- "Turn So Cold" on YouTube

"Turn So Cold" is a single by American rock band Drowning Pool, from their self-titled album. It is the third song from the album. Fans who preordered the album received "Turn So Cold", as well as the first single from the album, "Feel Like I Do" starting April 13, 2010.

"Turn So Cold" is one of the highest-charting singles by Drowning Pool, reaching #8 at the Hot Mainstream Rock Tracks chart and #25 at the Rock Songs chart.

== Music video ==
The official music video was released in June.

== Track listing ==
No.	Title	Length
1.	"Turn So Cold"	3:38

== Personnel ==
- Ryan McCombs – vocals
- C. J. Pierce – guitar
- Mike Luce – drums
- Stevie Benton – bass

== Chart positions ==
Year	Chart	Position
2010	US Mainstream Rock Tracks	8
2010	US Rock Songs	25
