= 5 Songs (Seether EP) =

EP by Seether
- Released: 10 August 2002
- Genre: Post-grunge; alternative rock
- Length: 19:05
- Label: Wind-up

Seether chronology
5 Songs (2002)	Seether EP (2002)

5 Songs EP is the first EP by South African rock band Seether. It was released through Wind-up Records on 10 August 2002. All five songs on the EP were included on the band's debut album, Disclaimer.

== Track listing ==
No.	Title	Length
1.	"Driven Under"	4:35
2.	"Gasoline"	2:50
3.	"Sympathetic"	4:09
4.	"Fine Again"	4:05
5.	"Needles"	3:26
Total length:		19:05

== Personnel ==
- Shaun Morgan – guitar, vocals
- Dale Stewart – bass, backing vocals
- Dave Cohoe – drums
