= Fine Again =

2002 single by Seether

Single by Seether

from the album Disclaimer
- B-side: "Take Me Away"; "Hang On"
- Released: August 2002
- Genre: Post-grunge
- Length: 4:04
- Label: Wind-up
- Songwriters: Shaun Morgan; Dale Stewart
- Producer: Jay Baumgardner

Seether singles chronology
"Fine Again" (2002)	"Driven Under" (2003)

Music video
- "Fine Again" on YouTube

"Fine Again" is the debut single by the South African rock band Seether, released in 2002. The song first appeared on the 2000 album Fragile (which was released when Seether were still going by the name Saron Gas). It was also later included on the 2002 EP 5 Songs, and it is the third track on their 2002 debut studio album Disclaimer.

During live shows, Shaun Morgan has been known to dedicate the song to Dave Williams of Drowning Pool as well as Dimebag Darrell of Pantera.

Morgan wrote the song after his parents got divorced.

== Music video ==
The video for the song, directed by Paul Fedor, features the band playing on a soundstage while three walls behind them display filmstrip slides of people holding opaque rectangles with phrases depicting their inner feelings on them explaining the reason why they feel down, and broken hearted (which is similar to the album cover). Seether arranged for the concept to be implemented on the cover art to Disclaimer. Ten different versions of the album were released, each featuring a photo of a person from the video. According to bassist Dale Stewart:

Seether came up with the idea of the people baring their souls and holding up the signs and we thought it was a good concept. It's kind of like a thread that runs through the whole album, the fragility, or whatever you want to call it, you know in people. People are always screwed up about something. It doesn't matter if they act like they're not as if they're alright. So therefore, there are times where everybody feels a broken heart.

== Appearances ==
"Fine Again" was featured on both the 2002 video games Madden 2003 and Nintendo's 1080° Avalanche, and in the 2018 film Boy Erased.

== Track listing ==
Europe Promo CD (2002)

No.	Title	Length
1.	"Fine Again" (Album Version)	4:04
2.	"Fine Again" (Acoustic Version)	4:03

- All tracks mixed by Jay Baumgardner

EP (Limited Edition)

No.	Title	Length
1.	"Fine Again"	4:05
2.	"Needles"	3:26
3.	"Got It Made"	4:51

- All tracks mixed by Jay Baumgardner

US (2002) and Europe (2004) Promo CD

No.	Title	Length
1.	"Fine Again"	4:04

- Mixed by Jay Baumgardner

Australia (2004) Promo CD

No.	Title	Length
1.	"Fine Again"

- Mixed by Bob Marlette

Europe and Australia Maxi-Single (2004)

No.	Title	Length
1.	"Fine Again" (New Album Version)	4:05
2.	"Take Me Away"	3:57
3.	"Hang On"	3:12
4.	"Fine Again" (Acoustic Version)	4:02
5.	"Fine Again" (Video)	4:04

- Tracks 1, 2 mixed by Bob Marlette
- Tracks 3, 4 mixed by Jay Baumgardner
- Fine Again (Video) on Europe CD only

== Chart positions ==
Chart (2002)	Peak position
U.S. Billboard Hot 100	61
U.S. Active Rock	1
U.S. Billboard Hot Mainstream Rock Tracks	3
U.S. Billboard Hot Modern Rock Tracks	6

== Certifications ==
Region	Certification	Certified units/sales
New Zealand (RMNZ)	Platinum	30,000^{‡}
United States (RIAA)	2× Platinum	2,000,000^{‡}
^{‡} Sales+streaming figures based on certification alone.
