= Bodies (Drowning Pool song) =

Single by Drowning Pool

from the album Sinner
- Released: May 14, 2001
- Genre: Nu metal; hard rock
- Length: 3:24
- Label: Wind-up
- Songwriters: Stevie Benton; Mike Luce; C.J. Pierce; Dave Williams

Drowning Pool singles chronology
"Bodies" (2001)	"Tear Away" (2002)

Music video
- "Bodies" on YouTube

"Bodies" is the debut single by the American rock band Drowning Pool, released in May 2001 from their debut album Sinner. "Bodies" is Drowning Pool's signature song and has been featured in various films, television programs, and advertisements since its release. It was also the theme song for the 2001 WWF SummerSlam pay-per-view event, as well as that of the ECW brand from 2006 to 2007, including the ECW One Night Stand pay-per-view events in 2005 and 2006. It was also played during AEW Double or Nothing 2025 in the Anarchy in the Arena Match. During 2001, the song became increasingly popular, but was briefly taken off radio stations after the September 11 attacks due to the nature of the lyrics. The song is lyrically about moshing, but it was also meant to be vague in order for the listener to have their own interpretation.

An early version of "Bodies" appeared on Drowning Pool's EP Pieces of Nothing, omitting the lyrics in the bridge and featuring a significantly greater amount of screaming.

In 2017, Annie Zaleski of Spin named the song the twelfth-best nu metal track of all time.

== Music and lyrics ==
Considered a nu metal (Note: Multiple sources:) and hard rock song, "Bodies" features heavy use of the lyric "let the bodies hit the floor". Its lyrics build by gradually counting up from one to four, shouting the number each time, until reaching its intense chorus. Clean vocals in the song's verses make a contrast from the many harsh vocals elsewhere. The guitar structure of "Bodies" features a heavy use of the wah pedal.

Drowning Pool's original vocalist Dave Williams talked about "Bodies" on Uranium, saying:

CJ came up with the riff, and I thought that was cool and I said, "Let the bodies hit the floor," and they looked at me and said, "That's pretty cool." We just built it around that hook and the rest fell in place. It's about my perspective when I look out and see the pit. It's about forgetting everything that has happened to you that week, leave your bullshit at the door and get it all out. But you have to have respect for the others in the pit. If you push them down, you have to pick them back up. I'm not going to get behind the violence thing, it is violent, but there is a certain amount of respect and a code.

== Commercial performance and critical reception ==
=== Commercial performance ===
The song peaked at number 6 on the Billboard's Mainstream Rock Tracks chart in August 2001, and No. 12 on the Alternative Songs charts in September 2001. The song was certified gold by the Recording Industry Association of America on June 24, 2008, then certified platinum on January 31, 2019 with a million digital copies sold. The song re-entered the chart in April 2016 and reached No. 6 on the Hard Rock Digital Songs and No. 30 on the Rock Digital Songs charts. It has sold 1,751,000 digital copies in the US as of April 2016. On September 22, 2001, "Bodies" peaked at number 19 on the Bubbling Under Hot 100 Singles chart. It also reached number 34 on the UK Singles Chart.

=== Critical reception ===
Rolling Stone called "Bodies" "Drowning Pool's finest moment on" Sinner.

== Music video ==
Much like the song's radio success, the "Bodies" music video found significant airplay on various music channels in 2001. Directed by Glen Bennett, it shows the band performing in what appears to be a psychiatric hospital, with Williams screaming the lyrics into the ear of a man strapped to a chair. Clips from the video were later used in the title animation for the music program Uranium.

== Usage in media ==
The song was used in the film trailers for Jason X (2001) and Stop-Loss (2008), as well as the season 3 trailer for horror drama series Yellowjackets (2021–present). It is also used in the opening scene of The One (2001). The song is commonly associated with being used in early YouTube videos, particularly in use with videos involving video games.

The song was sampled by Shaquille O'Neal in "Thotties Hit the Floor" (2023). Psychostick recorded a parody of the song called "Numbers (I Can Only Count to Four)" on their album Space Vampires vs Zombie Dinosaurs in 3D (2011).

The song has also seen prominent use across various professional wrestling promotions, being used as the official theme song for WWF SummerSlam 2001 and WWE's revival of ECW from 2006 to 2007, as well as the 2005 and 2006 editions of One Night Stand and the 2006 December to Dismember event. The song was also played during the Anarchy in the Arena match at All Elite Wrestling (AEW)'s 2025 Double or Nothing event.

The band performed the song on The Tonight Show Starring Jimmy Fallon as a mashup with Offset and J.I.D's track "Bodies", which itself samples the song.

In animation, the song was used in Season two of the 2025 adaptation of Devil May Cry. The song's lyrics were referenced in the English dub of the anime The 100 Girlfriends Who Really, Really, Really, Really, Really Love You.

== Controversy ==
Due to the misinterpretation of its lyrics, the song created controversy. In 2011, the song was linked to the shooting of Congresswoman Gabby Giffords, after it was discovered that the perpetrator, Jared Lee Loughner, had saved an unofficial video featuring the song while an American flag burns as a "favorite" on his YouTube account. In response, the band issued a statement concerning the link: "We were devastated this weekend to learn of the tragic events that occurred in Arizona and that our music has been misinterpreted. 'Bodies' was written about the brotherhood of the moshpit and was never about violence." The band also added: "For someone to put out a video misinterpreting a song about a moshpit as fuel for a violent act shows just how sick they really are. We support those who do what they can to keep America safe. Our hearts go out to the victims and their families of this terrible tragedy".

The song was used by interrogators at the Guantanamo Bay detention camps in 2003. "Bodies" was repeatedly played over a 10-day period during the interrogation of Mohamedou Ould Salahi while he was "exposed to variable lighting patterns" at the same time. In 2006, Drowning Pool bassist Stevie Benton took pride in the military usage of the song. He said: "People assume we should be offended that somebody in the military thinks our song is annoying enough that, played over and over, it can psychologically break someone down. I take it as an honor to think that perhaps our song could be used to quell another 9/11 attack or something like that."

On February 17, 2003, 19-year-old Joshua Cooke shot and killed his parents with his 12 gauge Remington Model 870 shotgun while listening to the song on his headphones with a CD player.

== Track listing ==
All tracks are written by Drowning Pool.

No.	Title	Length
1.	"Bodies"	3:24
2.	"Bodies" (live at Ozzfest)	3:28
3.	"Sermon" (Total Rock Session, London)	4:38
4.	"Bodies" (video)

Limited EP

No.	Title	Length
1.	"Bodies"
2.	"Tear Away"
3.	"I Am" (demo)
4.	"Follow" (demo)

Vinyl

No.	Title	Length
1.	"Bodies"
2.	"Bodies" (recorded live at US Ozzfest, 2001)

"Bodies Remix" guitar down promo CD

No.	Title	Length
1.	"Bodies Remix" (guitar down)	3:21

Promo CD

No.	Title	Length
1.	"Bodies"	3:24

Promo CD #2

No.	Title	Length
1.	"Bodies"
2.	"Tear Away"

== Charts ==
Chart (2001–2002)	Peak position
Scottish Singles Sales (Official Charts)	33
UK Singles (Official Charts)	34
UK Rock & Metal (Official Charts)	3
US Bubbling Under Hot 100 (Billboard)	19
US Alternative Airplay (Billboard)	12
US Mainstream Rock (Billboard)	6

== Certifications ==
Region	Certification	Certified units/sales
New Zealand (RMNZ)	2× Platinum	60,000^{‡}
United Kingdom (BPI) Sales since 2008	Platinum	600,000^{‡}
United States (RIAA)	Platinum	1,000,000^{‡}
^{‡} Sales+streaming figures based on certification alone.
