= By the Blood =

Single by Drowning Pool

from the album Hellelujah
- Released: November 19, 2015
- Genre: Alternative metal
- Length: 3:27
- Songwriters: Stevie Benton; Mike Luce; Jasen Moreno; C.J. Pierce

Drowning Pool singles chronology
"One Finger and a Fist" (2013)	"By the Blood" (2015)

Music video
- "By the Blood" on YouTube

"By the Blood" is a song by American rock band Drowning Pool. It was released as the lead single from the band's sixth studio album Hellelujah. The song also featured during the World Series of Fighting 25 on November 20, 2015.

== Music video ==
A music video for the song was released on the band's official YouTube channel on December 18, 2015.

== Charts ==
Chart (2015)	Peak position
US Mainstream Rock (Billboard)	33
