= Sinner (Drowning Pool song) =

Single by Drowning Pool

from the album Sinner
- Released: August 13, 2002
- Genre: Nu metal
- Length: 2:27
- Label: Wind-up
- Songwriter: Drowning Pool

Drowning Pool singles chronology
"Tear Away" (2002)	"Sinner" (2002)	"Step Up" (2004)

Music video
- "Sinner" on YouTube

"Sinner" is a song by American rock band Drowning Pool, released in August 2002 as the third and final single from their debut album of the same name. It is the last single to feature Dave Williams as lead vocalist before his death the following day.

The track served as the theme song of the film The One, starring Jet Li.

It was also the theme song of WWF's Vengeance 2001.

== Music video ==
The "Sinner" music video was filmed in October 2001 and was directed by Gregory Dark. It was shot in and around an abandoned Los Angeles motel called the Pink Lady, was inspired by the David Fincher film Seven. The video features the band playing in a swimming pool during heavy rain. Footage includes a dominatrix and pit bulls, a woman who lies in a tanning bed until her skin becomes leathery, and an obese man sitting in a recliner in front of a TV set. The man continuously gorges on food until finally his belly explodes, his innards splattering all over the room.

Regarding the making of music video, Dave Williams said "They rained on us for four hours straight and it was cold, man. We had to play in the mud. And we didn't sleep for, like, two days because we shot the thing from six at night until eight in the morning. We all got sick, but it was cool". and "There are these scenes with a dominatrix and pit bulls and there are these fat guys exploding and a chick that's been laying in a tanning bed for too long and her skin turns to leather. When we were done shooting, the only things left standing were the prostitutes coming in and out of the motel".

== Meaning ==
Regarding the song's meaning, vocalist Dave Williams explained, "Every religion has a list ... Catholics can drink and that's OK, but the Baptists say if you drink you're going to Hell. Everybody's got that list of what is going to keep you from getting into Heaven, but everybody's broken at least one of those rules, no matter what religion you are ... basically, I'm just saying we're all sinners".
