= Drowning Pool (album) =

Studio album by Drowning Pool
- Released: April 27, 2010
- Recorded: 2008–2009
- Studios: House of Loud Studios (Elmwood Park, New Jersey)
- Genres: Hard rock; post-grunge; alternative metal
- Length: 39:33
- Label: Eleven Seven
- Producer: Kato Khandwala

Drowning Pool chronology
Loudest Common Denominator (2009)	Drowning Pool (2010)	Resilience (2013)

Singles from Drowning Pool
- 1. "Feel Like I Do" Released: February 9, 2010; 2. "Turn So Cold" Released: July 19, 2010; 3. "Let the Sin Begin" Released: August 12, 2011

Professional ratings
Review scores
Source	Rating
AllMusic	3/5 stars
Hard Rock Hideout	9/10 stars

Drowning Pool is the fourth studio album by American rock band Drowning Pool. It was released on April 27, 2010. It is the band's first album not to feature a different singer, as Ryan McCombs remained with Drowning Pool after their 2007 album Full Circle. However, this album ended up being the last album to feature him, as he left the band in 2011 to rejoin his previous band SOiL. McCombs eventually rejoined Drowning Pool in 2023.

The song "Feel Like I Do" was released as a digital single. It reflects a tough period in McCombs' life during which he went through a divorce, moved out of his home and lost his father. Fans who preordered the album received a download of the single as well as the second single "Turn So Cold" starting April 13, 2010. According to Blabbermouth.net, Drowning Pool's self-titled album sold 12,000 copies in its first week, earning it the number 35 spot on the Billboard 200, up from the number 64 reached by Full Circle in 2007.

Three singles, "Feel Like I Do", "Turn So Cold" and "Let the Sin Begin" were released to promote the album. The first two singles reached top 10 in the Hot Mainstream Rock Tracks charts. It was thought that "Regret" would have been released as the third single. However, this never happened for unknown reasons.

In late 2010, the band announced their intentions to record a music video for each of the album's songs.

The band ceased promotion of the album in 2011 due to Ryan McCombs' departure. The band began writing new material and have recorded and performed with Jasen Moreno from 2012 to 2023, before McCombs returned.

== Track listing ==
All lyrics are written by Ryan McCombs; all music is composed by Drowning Pool.

No.	Title	Length
1.	"Let the Sin Begin"	3:36
2.	"Feel Like I Do"	3:33
3.	"Turn So Cold"	3:38
4.	"Regret"	3:16
5.	"Over My Head"	3:26
6.	"All About Me"	3:41
7.	"More Than Worthless"	3:56
8.	"Children of the Gun"	3:31
9.	"Alcohol Blind"	4:12
10.	"Horns Up"	3:45
11.	"King Zero"	2:59
Total length:		39:33

== Personnel ==
Drowning Pool

- Ryan McCombs – vocals
- C.J. Pierce – guitar
- Mike Luce – drums
- Stevie Benton – bass

Additional personnel

- Kato Khandwala – producer, engineer, digital editing, programming
- David Bendeth – mixing
- Dan Korneff – mixing, mix engineer, engineer, digital editing, programming, drum technician
- Ted Jensen – mastering
- John Bender - engineer, digital editing, additional backing vocals, additional vocal production
- Michael "Mitch" Milan – engineer, digital editing, guitar technician
- Trevor Niemann – art direction, design

== Charts ==
Chart (2010)	Peak position
US Billboard 200	35
US Independent Albums (Billboard)	5
US Top Hard Rock Albums (Billboard)	3
US Top Rock Albums (Billboard)	10
