= Tear Away =

Single by Drowning Pool

from the album Sinner
- Released: April 30, 2002
- Genre: Nu metal
- Length: 4:14
- Label: Wind-up; Epic
- Songwriter: Drowning Pool

Drowning Pool singles chronology
"Bodies" (2001)	"Tear Away" (2002)	"Sinner" (2002)

Music video
- "Tear Away" on YouTube

"Tear Away" is a song by American rock band Drowning Pool, released in 2002 as the second single from their album Sinner.

The single charted in the United States at number 18 and 37 on Billboard's Mainstream Rock and Modern Rock charts respectively.

"Tear Away" was one of two main themes for the World Wrestling Federation's WrestleMania X8 pay-per-view, and the band performed the song at the event. Professional wrestler Kevin Steen also used the song as his entrance theme during his time in Combat Zone Wrestling and Ring of Honor.

== Meaning ==
Dave Williams explained the meaning of the song: "Everybody at one time or another in their life needs to say, 'Forget everybody else, I need to deal with me. I need to take care of myself'".

== Track listing ==
CD single #1

All tracks are written by Drowning Pool.

No.	Title	Length
1.	"Tear Away" (album version)	4:14
2.	"Tear Away" (live acoustic radio session)	4:18
3.	"Break You"	2:48
4.	"Tear Away" (video)	4:22

CD single #2

No.	Title	Length
1.	"Tear Away"
2.	"The Game"
3.	"Break You"
4.	"Tear Away" (video)

Cardsleeve CD single • vinyl

No.	Title	Length
1.	"Tear Away" (album version)	4:14
2.	"Break You"	2:48

Austria promo CD

No.	Title	Length
1.	"Tear Away" (album version)	4:14

UK promo CD

No.	Title	Length
1.	"Tear Away" (radio edit)	3:41
2.	"Tear Away" (album version)	4:14

US promo CD

No.	Title	Length
1.	"Tear Away" (radio version)	4:14
2.	"Tear Away" (album version)	4:14

== Charts ==
Chart (2002)	Peak position
Scotland (OCC)	64
UK Singles (OCC)	65
UK Rock & Metal (OCC)	6
US Alternative Airplay (Billboard)	36
US Mainstream Rock (Billboard)	28
