= AM Conspiracy =

American alternative metal band

Background information
- Origin: Orlando, Florida, U.S.
- Genres: Alternative metal, nu metal
- Years active: 2005–2011
- Label: Burnhill Union
- Spinoff of: Drowning Pool
- Members: Jason "Gong" Jones; Dean Andrews; Kenny Harrelson; Drew Burke; Rob DeHaven
- Website: amconspiracy.com

AM Conspiracy was an American alternative metal band from Orlando, Florida, formed in 2005. Their lineup consisted of Jason "Gong" Jones, who was member of the band Drowning Pool when they recorded the album Desensitized, (vocals), Dean Andrews (drums), Kenny Harrelson (bass guitar), Drew Burke (guitar), and Rob DeHaven (guitar).

== History ==
The band began when two long-time friends, Dean Andrews and Kenny Harrelson met with Jason "Gong" Jones, former front man of Drowning Pool. Jones wanted to create his own music, rather than following the lead of others like in his previous role, so when Andrews and Harrelson met him, it was clear that they had the same vision. With the addition of Drew Burke and the rejoining of Rob DeHaven, the band finally had the right minds and skills in place to create music.

In early 2007, the band signed with Corporate Punishment Records and began work on its first release with Rae DiLeo (Filter, Army of Anyone). Shortly after signing, the band parted ways with the label and released a four-song EP entitled Out of the Shallow End. Two of the tracks off the EP ("Absence" and "Far") were featured in regular rotation on XM Radio's SquiZZ, Europe's Kerrang!, and various FM stations across the US. "Right on Time" (another track off the EP) and "Welt" (previously unreleased) were part of the WWE SmackDown vs. Raw 2008 soundtrack.

AM Conspiracy's self-titled debut album was recorded at Belle City Sound studio in Racine, Wisconsin with producer Chris Djuricic (Novembers Doom bassist). It was released on January 12, 2010, via Burnhill Union Records (a newly launched independent label from Chicago). The first single off the album, "Pictures", was mixed by Randy Staub, who had previously worked with Metallica, Nickelback and Alice in Chains, among others.

In November 2010, the band parted ways with their label, Burnhill Union Records, and were reported working in pre-production for their second album. No news of the band or album have been heard since, and as of 2026, the band is still currently on hiatus.

== Name origin ==
When asked about the origin of the band's name in an interview, Jason said "...I did, I came up with it. When I lived in Venice in California, when I first started tattooing, I did nothing but black and gray tattoos for god, three or four years. It started to drive me crazy so I started to drive in to Anaheim which was forty-five minutes to an hour each way, I got tired of just listening to the CDs I had and of course the radio, that wasn't working either... So for some odd reason I put it on the am station, started scrolling through, I think the first thing I hit was like Art Bell (...) it's like people talking about all kinds of conspiracy theories like you know, aliens in the backyard, this and that and all kind of crazy stuff so I got stuck on it for a minute and it just turned into the AM Conspiracy..."

== Band members ==
- Jason "Gong" Jones – lead vocals
- Dean Andrews – drums
- Kenny Harrelson – bass guitar
- Drew Burke – guitar
- Rob DeHaven – guitar

== Discography ==
=== Albums ===
- Out of the Shallow End EP (2007)
- AM Conspiracy (2010)

=== Singles ===
- "Far" (2007)
- "Welt" (2009)
- "Pictures" (2010)
