= Broken (Seether song) =

2004 single by Seether

Single by Seether featuring Amy Lee

from the album The Punisher: The Album and Disclaimer II
- B-side: "69 Tea"; "Something in the Way" (live); "Out of My Way"; "Got It Made"
- Released: 19 April 2004
- Studio: Henson (Hollywood, California)
- Genre: Post-grunge
- Length: 4:21
- Label: Wind-up; Epic
- Songwriters: Shaun Welgemoed; Dale Stewart
- Producer: Bob Marlette

Seether singles chronology
"Gasoline" (2003)	"Broken" (2004)	"Remedy" (2005)

Amy Lee singles chronology
"Broken" (2004)	"Freak on a Leash" (2007)

Music video
- "Broken" on YouTube

"Broken" is a song by South African rock band Seether, first appearing on their debut album, Disclaimer (2002). It was reworked and recorded again in 2004, this time featuring American singer Amy Lee, the lead singer of Evanescence and then-girlfriend of Seether vocalist Shaun Morgan. It was included on the soundtrack to the 2004 Marvel Comics superhero film The Punisher, and was also on Seether's second studio album, Disclaimer II.

Released as a single on 19 April 2004, "Broken" peaked at number 20 on the US Billboard Hot 100, number three in Australia, and number two in New Zealand. It was later certified four-times platinum by the Recording Industry Association of America (RIAA) and the Australian Recording Industry Association (ARIA). It is the band's only song to appear on the Billboard Adult Contemporary chart and was frequently played on rock radio, peaking at number nine on the Billboard Mainstream Rock Tracks chart and number four on the Billboard Modern Rock Tracks chart.

Morgan wrote the song about the breakup of his marriage and family, after his first wife chose to remain in South Africa with their daughter rather than accompany him to live in the United States.

== Critical reception ==
While reviewing Disclaimer, Jason D. Taylor of the website AllMusic noted, "The album closes with the one successful laid-back song: 'Broken' is mellow yet confident, as vocalist Shaun Morgan finds the courage to open himself up without releasing a scream every few seconds." The song earned Seether a Metal Edge Readers' Choice Award in 2004, when it was voted "Best Song from a Movie Soundtrack".

== Music video ==
Directed by Nigel Dick, the video features Morgan sitting in an abandoned car playing an acoustic guitar while Amy Lee, wearing black angel wings, appears behind him as her vocals fade in. For the rest of the video, Lee and Morgan wander through a dilapidated landscape that was revealed on the Disclaimer II DVD to be a real-life trailer park that was burned to ashes by a crystal meth lab explosion. Although there are shots of the band and Lee performing together in a clearing, the underlying theme of the video is that Lee and Morgan are looking for but will never find each other. Lee knows that Morgan is there and where he is throughout the video but Morgan is unaware of her presence around him, which explains the lyrics "you've gone away... you don't feel me here anymore".

== Track listings ==
US, European, and Australian maxi-CD single

1. "Broken" (featuring Amy Lee)
2. "69 Tea"
3. "Something in the Way" ("Live X" session at 99X, Atlanta)
4. "Out of My Way"
5. "Broken" (video)

European CD single

1. "Broken" featuring Amy Lee – 4:18
2. "Out of My Way" – 3:51

European mini-CD single

1. "Broken" featuring Amy Lee (album version) – 4:18
2. "Got It Made" – 5:10

== Credits and personnel ==
Credits are taken from the Disclaimer II liner notes.

Studios

- Recorded and mixed at Henson Recording Studios (Hollywood, California)
- Mastered at The Lodge (New York City)

Personnel

- Shaun Morgan – writing (as Shaun Welgemoed), vocals, guitar
- Dale Stewart – writing, bass, vocals
- Amy Lee – featured vocals, string arrangement
- Pat Callahan – additional guitars
- John Humphrey – drums
- Double G – string arrangement
- Bob Marlette – production, mixing, engineering
- Dan "I Love the Metric System!" Certa – recording engineer
- Alex Gibson – recording engineer (strings)
- Jeremy Parker – assistant recording engineer
- Jeff Moses – assistant recording engineer
- Sid Riggs – Pro Tools recording and mix engineering
- Jon Berkowitz – assistant mix engineering
- Emily Lazar – mastering

== Charts ==
=== Weekly charts ===
Chart (2004–2005)	Peak position
Australia (ARIA)	3
Austria (Ö3 Austria Top 40)	26
Belgium (Ultratip Bubbling Under Wallonia)	3
Canada Radio (Nielsen BDS)	2
Canada CHR/Pop Top 30 (Radio & Records)	8
Canada Hot AC Top 30 (Radio & Records)	14
Canada Rock Top 30 (Radio & Records)	2
France (SNEP)	42
Germany (GfK)	18
Greece (IFPI)	10
Iceland (Dagblaðið Vísir Top 20)	1
Italy (FIMI)	30
Netherlands (Dutch Top 40)	31
Netherlands (Single Top 100)	30
New Zealand (Recorded Music NZ)	2
Quebec (ADISQ)	1
Spain (Promusicae)	10
Switzerland (Schweizer Hitparade)	27
UK Singles (OCC)	106
UK Rock & Metal (Official Charts)	18
US Billboard Hot 100	20
US Adult Contemporary (Billboard)	40
US Adult Pop Airplay (Billboard)	12
US Alternative Airplay (Billboard)	4
US Mainstream Rock (Billboard)	9
US Pop Airplay (Billboard)	10

=== Year-end charts ===
Chart (2004)	Position
Australia (ARIA)	24
New Zealand (RIANZ)	28
US Adult Top 40 (Billboard)	41
US Mainstream Rock Tracks (Billboard)	33
US Modern Rock Tracks (Billboard)	25

Chart (2005)	Position
US Adult Top 40 (Billboard)	56
US Mainstream Top 40 (Billboard)	72

== Certifications ==
Region	Certification	Certified units/sales
Australia (ARIA)	Platinum	70,000^{^}
Brazil (Pro-Música Brasil)	Gold	30,000^{‡}
New Zealand (RMNZ)	2× Platinum	60,000^{‡}
United Kingdom (BPI)	Silver	200,000^{‡}
United States (RIAA)	4× Platinum	4,000,000^{‡}
^{^} Shipments figures based on certification alone.^{‡} Sales+streaming figures based on certification alone.

== Release history ==
Region	Date	Format(s)	Label(s)	Ref.
United States	19 April 2004	Mainstream rock; active rock; alternative radio	Wind-up	
Australia	9 August 2004	CD	Wind-up; Epic	
United States	9 August 2004	Contemporary hit; hot adult contemporary radio	Wind-up	
United Kingdom	4 October 2004	CD	Wind-up; Epic	
