= Strike a Nerve =

Studio album by Drowning Pool
- Released: September 30, 2022
- Genre: Alternative metal
- Length: 37:12
- Label: T-Boy; UMe
- Producer: Shawn McGee

Drowning Pool chronology
Hellelujah (2016)	Strike a Nerve (2022)

Singles from Strike a Nerve
- 1. "Mind Right" Released: August 5, 2022; 2. "Choke" Released: August 26, 2022; 3. "A Devil More Damned" Released: September 24, 2022

Strike a Nerve is the seventh studio album by American rock band Drowning Pool. The album was released on September 30, 2022, by T-Boy and UMe. It is the final Drowning Pool album recorded with vocalist Jasen Moreno before his departure in 2023. The album was announced August 5 along with the release of lead single "Mind Right". Second single "Choke" was released August 26, and third single "A Devil More Damned" released September 24. Strike a Nerve is the first studio album from Drowning Pool since Hellelujah (2016), making it the longest gap between two studio albums. The album also marked the first time in the band's history that they had recorded three studio albums with the same singer, Jasen Moreno, who appeared on Hellelujah and its 2013 predecessor Resilience.

== Background ==
In an interview with Loudwire's Todd Fooks, vocalist Jasen Moreno explained that he was "hesitant to talk about the lyrical content. I'm being evasive because of cancel culture and all that. Let's just say... it was one of those occasions where I wanted to speak my mind on certain political feelings (that I had). I really hesitate to use the band as a political platform to push my agendas, I really shy away from that. (But) I was really frustrated with the world I was seeing around me."

== Critical reception ==
Chad Childers of Loudwire stated with respect to lead single "Mind Right" that "The band comes out of the gate swinging with a full throttle rocker, featuring a prominent low groove, aggressive drumming and singer Jasen Moreno's in-your-face vocal about making sure you're all squared away".

Blabbermouth.net described the song as "a perfect re-introduction to the band for the 2020s", going on to say with respect to "Choke" that "the band doesn't let the addition of melody stop the track from being a metallic banger".

== Track listing ==
Strike a Nerve track listing
No.	Title	Length
1.	"Doing Time in Hell"	1:13
2.	"Hate Against Hate"	3:34
3.	"Stay and Bleed"	3:09
4.	"Strike a Nerve"	3:05
5.	"Racing to a Red Light"	3:45
6.	"Choke"	3:20
7.	"Everything but You"	3:51
8.	"Down in the Dirt"	4:15
9.	"Rope"	2:53
10.	"A Devil More Damned"	4:54
11.	"Mind Right"	3:13
Total length:		37:12

== Personnel ==
Drowning Pool

- Jasen Moreno – vocals
- C.J. Pierce – guitars
- Stevie Benton – bass
- Mike Luce – drums

Production

- Shawn McGee – producer, engineering, mixing, mastering
- Melody Myers – artwork, design
- Cade Clevelin – photography
