= AM Conspiracy (album) =

Studio album by AM Conspiracy
- Released: January 12, 2010
- Recorded: Early 2009
- Genre: Alternative metal, nu metal
- Length: 54:00
- Label: Burnhill Union
- Producer: AM Conspiracy; Chris Wisco

AM Conspiracy chronology
Out of the Shallow End (2007)	AM Conspiracy (2010)

Singles from AM Conspiracy
- 1. "Welt" Released: November 24, 2009; 2. "Pictures" Released: May 20, 2010

Professional ratings
Review scores
Source	Rating
AllMusic	2.5/5 stars

AM Conspiracy is the only studio album by American alternative metal band AM Conspiracy. It was recorded in early 2009 at Belle City Sound in Racine, Wisconsin with Chris Wisco, who plays bass in Novembers Doom.

The first single off album, "Pictures", was mixed by Randy Staub, who has previously worked with Metallica, Nickelback, Alice in Chains and most recently Thousand Foot Krutch, among others. The band released another song titled "Welt" as a digital single.

== Background ==
Frontman Jones recently told AOL's Noisecreep about album, "It's 13 songs, all very different from each other. We try to mix it up and keep it going. We did it because a lot of records that have been coming out lately, in my opinion, sound like one long song. We try to steer away from that as far as possible. So it's got a good mixture of different emotions that hopefully it'll take people through. It has different kinds of music. Some stuff's real heavy. Some stuff's pretty light."

== Album cover ==
Stephen Jensen photographed the band last spring when they were recording the album up in Racine, WI, and was asked to create the album artwork for their debut.

AM Conspiracy singer Jason "Gong" Jones, who himself is an accomplished tattoo artist, contacted Stephen with several different concepts for the cover of his debut album during the course of recording. Stephen and Jason hit it off immediately and began bouncing ideas back and forth. When Jason came up with the idea to do a stylized version of a dollar bill with altered and hidden imagery it took a bit of "selling" to the record label. Stephen loved the idea and sat down with Jason to help expand the idea and bring his vision to life.

For the main image on the cover, Jason wanted to feature the band's faces carved over the sculpture of Mount Rushmore with a radio antenna on the top of the mountain spreading the AM Conspiracy message. The photo would appear as part of the engraving on an altered one dollar bill (to symbolize their first album). Stephen used some of the stylized filigrees that appear on the one dollar bill and played into the conspiracy theories regarding hidden imagery that are mixed into the engravings on the original currency design.

Stephen and Jason worked together to carry the conspiracy theory imagery throughout the rest of the album artwork including the layout of Washington DC, UFO and alien implants, the Paul McCartney death hoax, the JFK magic bullet theory, the Lincoln assassination, and the faked lunar landing. Gong made a late night call to Stephen immediately after seeing the first draft of the album cover. He was blown away that Stephen was able to take the vision exactly as it appeared in his head several steps further.

== Track listing ==
No.	Title	Writer(s)	Length
1.	"Revolution"	Jason "Gong" Jones	4:17
2.	"Welt"	Jason "Gong" Jones, Dean Andrews, Kenny Harrelson Jr., Brian Ginsberg	3:14
3.	"Pictures"	Jason "Gong" Jones	3:28
4.	"Myself"	Jason "Gong" Jones	3:13
5.	"Away"	Jason "Gong" Jones	2:50
6.	"Down"	Jason "Gong" Jones	4:50
7.	"Right on Time"	Jason "Gong" Jones	3:31
8.	"Far"	Jason "Gong" Jones	3:51
9.	"Absence"	Jason "Gong" Jones	3:15
10.	"Dead and Gone"	Jason "Gong" Jones	4:25
11.	"Believe"	Jason "Gong" Jones	3:24
12.	"The Gathering"	Jason "Gong" Jones	4:35
13.	"Learn to Learn" (The song "Learn to Learn" ends at minute mark 3.00. After 3 minutes and 30 seconds of silence [3:00 - 6:30], begins the hidden song "4 Days".)	Jason "Gong" Jones	9:05

== Personnel ==
- Jason "Gong" Jones – lead vocals, cover art concept
- Dean Andrews – drums
- Kenny Harrelson – bass
- Drew Burke – lead guitar, backing vocals
- Rob DeHaven – rhythm guitar
- Chris Wisco – producer, engineer, mixing
- Randy Staub – mixing
- Heath Starling – photography
- Stephen Jensen – art direction, design, cover art concept
- Shaun Glass – A&R
