= Sinner (Drowning Pool album) =

Studio album by Drowning Pool
- Released: June 5, 2001
- Studio: Ocean (Burbank, California)
- Genres: Nu metal; alternative metal
- Length: 37:30
- Label: Wind-up
- Producer: Jay Baumgardner

Drowning Pool chronology
Pieces of Nothing (2000)	Sinner (2001)	Desensitized (2004)

Singles from Sinner
- 1. "Bodies" Released: May 14, 2001; 2. "Tear Away" Released: April 30, 2002; 3. "Sinner" Released: August 13, 2002

Professional ratings
Review scores
Source	Rating
AllMusic	3.5/5 stars
Entertainment Weekly	B+
Kerrang!	3/5 stars
Q	4/5 stars
Rolling Stone	3/5 stars

Sinner is the debut studio album by the American rock band Drowning Pool, released on June 5, 2001, by Wind-up Records. It is considered to be the band's most popular album, being certified platinum in the same year that it was released. This is the only studio album by the band to feature original lead singer Dave Williams. While touring in support of Sinner, he died on August 14, 2002, from hypertrophic cardiomyopathy. The album debuted at No. 14 on the Billboard 200 chart. Drowning Pool released a reissue of the album called the "Unlucky 13th Anniversary Edition" in 2014. The album was put at No. 25 on Metal Descent's list of "The 25 Best Alternative Metal Albums". Craft Recordings released a 25th anniversary vinyl reissue and another 25th anniversary edition on digital with the latter containing bonus tracks and the 2025 remaster of "Bodies".

== Writing and recording ==
Dave Williams explained how the album got its name in an MTV interview:

"I got that [Sinner tattoo] tattooed before we named the record. We were working on the song 'Sinner,' and our A&R guy said, 'That would be a good name for the record.' We all just looked at each other and said, 'Wow, OK.' It was just a natural progression that became the whole theme of the record. There are a lot of religious issues on the record and a lot of relationship issues. It just seemed like it would fit."

Williams also remarked on the track order: "We wanted to start with 'Sinner' and end with 'Sermon'. We covered all the bases on religion and bad relationships."

On "Sermon", Mike Luce stated:

"We're fans of the 80s and back in the day there used to be that whole undertone .... oh, if you play that song backwards, you'll hear this message! So I guess I could tell you what it says. It really doesn't say anything. It recites a lyric from the same song, from 'Sermon.' We just play it backwards at the end of the song. It's just a homage. A tribute back to the old school. [...] It was completely done on a whim and we took a line that Davie (Williams) sang and just ran it in reverse at the tail end of the song. Just kind of a ... here you go. No hidden meaning; you don't have to play the song backwards to hear it. We'll just play it right out here for you."

The Unlucky 13th Anniversary Edition of the album contains an unreleased demo called "Heroes Sleeping". CJ Pierce explained the meaning of the song:

"Those last couple of rehearsals, we worked up a new song [Heroes Sleeping]. And I didn't even remember finishing the song. We actually did the song all the way through. So it's totally a gem of a find. Definitely, it's an emotional song to hear. 'Heroes Sleeping,' it's about other musicians who had passed away before us. That was Dave's [angle] on the lyrical content. Then literally just a few weeks later, he passed away. The song's kind of about him now. So I'm glad we can share that with our fans."

== Track listing ==
All tracks are written by Drowning Pool.

No.	Title	Length
1.	"Sinner"	2:27
2.	"Bodies"	3:21
3.	"Tear Away"	4:14
4.	"All Over Me"	3:13
5.	"Reminded"	3:24
6.	"Pity"	2:52
7.	"Mute"	3:19
8.	"I Am"	3:49
9.	"Follow"	3:20
10.	"Told You So"	3:05
11.	"Sermon"	4:19
Total length:		37:30

Unlucky 13th anniversary deluxe edition bonus disc (all tracks are demos)
No.	Title	Length
1.	"Sermon"	7:14
2.	"You Made Me"	4:02
3.	"Care Not"	8:33
4.	"Mask"	6:08
5.	"Soul"	6:15
6.	"Break You"	2:49
7.	"Less Than Zero"	4:33
8.	"Follow"	3:35
9.	"Told You So"	4:07
10.	"I Am"	4:01
11.	"Tear Away"	4:32
12.	"Bodies"	3:46
13.	"Heroes Sleeping"	4:50
Total length:		1:04:26

25th anniversary edition bonus digital tracks
No.	Title	Length
12.	"Break You (Demo)"	2:50
13.	"The Man Without Fear" (featuring Rob Zombie)	3:20
14.	"Bodies (Chris Vrenna's XXX Tweaker Mix)"	3:22
Total length:		47:02

== Personnel ==
Adapted from the album's liner notes.

Drowning Pool

- Dave Williams – vocals
- C. J. Pierce – guitars
- Stevie Benton – bass
- Mike Luce – drums

Production

- Jay Baumgardner – production, mixing at NRG Recording Studios, North Hollywood, California
- James Murray – engineering
- J.D. Andrew – assistant engineering
- Tom Baker – mastering at Precision Mastering, Hollywood, California
- Stig – guitar tech
- Ross – drum tech at Drum Doctors

Artwork

- Ed Sherman – album artwork
- Glen DiCrocco – photography
- Chapman Baehler – band photo

== Charts ==
=== Weekly charts ===
Weekly chart performance for Sinner
Chart (2001–2002)	Peak position
Australian Albums (ARIA)	73
Canadian Albums (Billboard)	53
New Zealand Albums (RMNZ)	18
UK Albums (Official Charts)	70
UK Rock & Metal Albums (Official Charts)	5
US Billboard 200	14

=== Year-end charts ===
Year-end chart performance for Sinner
Chart (2001)	Position
US Billboard 200	102

== Certifications ==
Certifications for Sinner
Region	Certification	Certified units/sales
New Zealand (RMNZ)	Gold	7,500^{‡}
United Kingdom (BPI)	Silver	60,000^{^}
United States (RIAA)	Platinum	1,000,000^{^}
^{^} Shipments figures based on certification alone.^{‡} Sales+streaming figures based on certification alone.
