= Step Up (Drowning Pool song) =

Single by Drowning Pool

from the album The Punisher: The Album and Desensitized
- Released: June 22, 2004
- Recorded: December 2003 – March 2004
- Genre: Nu metal; hard rock
- Length: 3:17
- Label: Wind-up
- Songwriters: Stevie Benton; Jason Jones; Mike Luce; C. J. Pierce

Drowning Pool singles chronology
"Sinner" (2002)	"Step Up" (2004)	"Love and War" (2004)

Music video
- "Step Up" on YouTube

"Step Up" is a song by American rock band Drowning Pool. It was originally released on The Punisher: The Album in March 2004 and appeared in the film's end credits. It was included on Drowning Pool's second studio album, Desensitized, the following month. This served as the band's first single with new frontman Jason "Gong" Jones and introduced him to many fans.

A music video was produced for "Step Up" which largely focuses on the band living a luxurious lifestyle at a mansion poolside. It received significant airplay on Headbangers Ball upon release. Former Evanescence guitarist Ben Moody makes a cameo appearance in the video.

Aside from The Punisher soundtrack, "Step Up" was also used on the soundtrack of NFL Street 2.

Similar to the Desensitized album cover design, the "Step Up" single features porn star Jesse Jane.

"Step Up" was used as the main theme song for the World Wrestling Entertainment pay-per-view WrestleMania XX.

"Step Up" was written about someone who meddled with Jones and suffered the consequences. For legal reasons, the singer can't discuss the details. Jason Gong said "It's cool, because now that person has to hear it all the time. ... That is probably the most therapeutic song on the record".

== Track listing ==
CD single

All tracks are written by Drowning Pool.

No.	Title	Length
1.	"Step Up"	3:22
2.	"Walls"	3:35
3.	"In the Studio and On the Set" (video)
4.	"Step Up" (video)

Promo CD

No.	Title	Length
1.	"Step Up" (album version)	3:18
2.	"Step Up" (radio edit)	3:18

Canada promo CD

No.	Title	Length
1.	"Step Up" (clean radio mix)	3:19

== Charts ==
=== Weekly charts ===
Weekly chart performance for "Step Up"
Chart (2004)	Peak position
UK Singles (Official Charts)	79
UK Rock & Metal (Official Charts)	8
US Mainstream Rock (Billboard)	7

=== Year-end charts ===
Year-end chart performance for "Step Up"
Chart (2004)	Position
US Mainstream Rock Tracks (Billboard)	26
