= Enemy (Drowning Pool song) =

Single by Drowning Pool

from the album Full Circle
- Released: December 4, 2007
- Studio: The Chapel; Backstage Studios; Nothing Pill; Cardiff Barfly
- Length: 3:26
- Label: Eleven Seven
- Songwriters: Stevie Benton; Mike Luce; Ryan McCombs; C.J. Pierce

Drowning Pool singles chronology
"Soldiers" (2007)	"Enemy" (2007)	"37 Stitches" (2008)

Music video
- "Enemy" on YouTube

"Enemy" is a song by American rock band Drowning Pool. It is the second track from their third studio album Full Circle.

== Meaning ==
The song was written by vocalist Ryan McCombs about the mudslinging the band SOiL did when he left them to be with his family.

Ryan McCombs explains meaning of the song "It was written about them (the bandmates), to be honest. When I quit the band I didn’t point any fingers. I cited personal reasons. I said that it had nothing to do with anything other than the fact that I just wanted to go home and be a full-time husband and father. But there were a lot of issues. Understandably so, I was always the fifth wheel there. Those guys, they grew up in the same music scene together. They grew up playing together. Three of the guys were in a band for seven years before I even joined. So, understandably, I was always on the outside looking in. It was a lot of different personality conflicts. Over time, you’re living on a bus together, it’s almost impossible to deal with when you’re living in that close proximity. I don’t think it was anybody’s fault. We were just different people and it was time for me to go. And when I did go, I didn’t even say that, and then all of a sudden I got attacked in the press in every form that you can imagine. They pretty much made every story up about me that you can even think of saying about somebody. It got really ugly. I never retorted. Even when I joined Drowning Pool and they started attacking Drowning Pool, none of the guys in the band ever commented or replied. We just ignored it. So, this song “Enemy” is about that, it's about taking the high road. The chorus, itself, is “I walked the high road away from you/God knows what I’ve been through.” I tried to write it in a way that works for anybody who's been in any kind of a situation, whether it be any type of a relationship or any type of working situation, where you took the high road, you kept you're mouth shut and you're trying to do the right thing and you still get called out for complete bullcrap. It's a tough thing to deal with. I just put it in a song instead of going public with it."

== Music video ==
Two music videos were made for the song. The first one shows animated versions of the band playing the song, while the second one shows some clips of the animated version and clips of the band playing live.

== Track listing ==
No.	Title	Length
1.	"Enemy"	3:26

Promo CD

No.	Title	Length
1.	"Enemy" (Vocal Up Version)	3:22
2.	"Enemy" (Album Version)	3:26

== Charts ==
Chart (2008)	Peak position
US Mainstream Rock (Billboard)	20
