= Out of the Shallow End =

EP by AM Conspiracy
- Released: August 7, 2007
- Genre: Alternative metal, nu metal
- Length: 14:51
- Producer: Jason Jones, Brian Diemar, Rae DiLeo

AM Conspiracy chronology
Out of the Shallow End (2007)	AM Conspiracy (2007)

Out of the Shallow End is a five-track EP released by the American alternative metal band AM Conspiracy. All of the songs on the EP would later be re-recorded for their self-titled debut album.

The tracks "Absence" and "Far" have experienced rotation on XM Satellite Radio's SquiZZ, Europe's Kerrang!, and various FM stations across the US. Then-previously unreleased songs "Right on Time" and "Welt" were featured in the video game WWE SmackDown vs. Raw 2008.

== Track listing ==
All tracks by Clint Campbell, Brian Diemar & Jason "Gong" Jones.

1. "Absence" – 3:18
2. "Far" – 3:51
3. "Right on Time" – 3:23
4. "Down" – 4:28
5. "Welt" – 3:20

== Personnel ==
- Jason "Gong" Jones – vocals
- Brian Diemar – guitar, programming
- Clint Campbell – guitar
- Kenny Harrelson – bass
- Dean Andrews – drums
- Rae DiLeo – co-producer, engineer
