= Full Circle (Drowning Pool album) =

Studio album by Drowning Pool
- Released: August 7, 2007
- Recorded: 2006–2007
- Genres: Post-grunge; alternative metal
- Length: 49:04
- Label: Eleven Seven
- Producers: Ben Schigel; Nikki Sixx; DJ Ashba

Drowning Pool chronology
Desensitized (2004)	Full Circle (2007)	Loudest Common Denominator (2009)

Singles from Full Circle
- 1. "Soldiers" Released: 2007; 2. "Enemy" Released: December 4, 2007; 3. "37 Stitches" Released: August 2008; 4. "Shame" Released: June 29, 2009

Professional ratings
Review scores
Source	Rating
AllMusic	2.5/5 stars

Full Circle is the third studio album by American rock band Drowning Pool, released on August 7, 2007, by Eleven Seven. It is the first Drowning Pool album to feature Ryan McCombs on vocals, formerly the singer of SOiL, who joined the band after the departure of Jason 'Gong' Jones in 2005. The first single off the album, "Soldiers", is dedicated to the United States Army.

The album debuted at number 64 on the United States Billboard 200, selling about 10,000 copies in its first week. As of September 12, 2007, the album has sold around 29,000 copies in the United States.

Four singles were released to promote the album. The final single "Shame" was released June 29, 2009 almost two years after the album's release. The album was moderately commercially successful, and received mainly positive reviews by fans. Drowning Pool embarked on several tours to promote Full Circle.

== Writing and recording ==
Full Circle is the only studio album by Drowning Pool with more than 11 tracks; it has 13. McCombs said that "Shame" was one of his favorite songs from the album. The entire band contributed to the album's writing process, as well as including an outside writer, Nikki Sixx who wrote a song for the band, entitled "Reason I'm Alive", which made it on the album. The album also includes a cover of Billy Idol's song "Rebel Yell".

The album was self funded. Ryan McCombs explained:

"Yeah, we fought for a while to get off of our former record label, Wind-Up. Nothing personal against them, just they came right out and even said they didn't really want to be in the metal business anymore. They wanted Drowning Pool but they didn't want us to sound like Drowning Pool. So, it was just time for us to split ways, and we fought to do that for a while. We also ended up splitting ways with our management, too. We just decided that we wanted to start over with a completely fresh, clean slate. So, by doing that we didn't have any backing whatsoever. So we went into the studio and we cut the album ourselves. We'd go up and play a show here or there every weekend if possible to help fund it. Yeah, we funded the album ourselves, and then used it to go shopping."

== Track listing ==
No.	Title	Writer(s)	Length
1.	"Full Circle"	Drowning Pool	3:18
2.	"Enemy"	Drowning Pool	3:26
3.	"Shame"	Drowning Pool	3:10
4.	"Reborn"	Drowning Pool	4:09
5.	"Reason I'm Alive"	Nikki Sixx	3:50
6.	"Soldiers"	Drowning Pool	3:31
7.	"Paralyzed"	Drowning Pool	3:42
8.	"Upside Down"	Drowning Pool	4:18
9.	"37 Stitches"	Drowning Pool	3:50
10.	"No More"	Drowning Pool	4:35
11.	"Love"	Drowning Pool	3:25
12.	"Duet"	Drowning Pool	3:21
13.	"Rebel Yell" (Billy Idol cover)	Billy Idol; Steve Stevens	4:22
Total length:			49:04

== Personnel ==
Drowning Pool

- Ryan McCombs – vocals
- Stevie Benton – bass
- C. J. Pierce – guitar
- Mike Luce – drums

Production

- Produced by Ben Schigel except "Reason I'm Alive" (by Nikki Sixx and DJ Ashba)
- Recorded by Ben Schigel at January Sound Studio, Dallas, Texas
- Mixed by Mike Plotnikoff except "Reason I'm Alive"
- Engineered by Mikal Blue
- Artwork by P.R. Brown
- Live photos by Michelle Overson
- Executive producer: Allan Kovac

== Charts ==
Chart (2007)	Peak position
US Billboard 200	64
US Independent Albums (Billboard)	7
US Top Hard Rock Albums (Billboard)	9
US Top Rock Albums (Billboard)	19
