= Disclaimer (Seether album) =

2002 studio album by Seether

Studio album by Seether
- Released: 20 August 2002
- Studios: Larrabee (North Hollywood); NRG Recording Studios (North Hollywood)
- Genres: Post-grunge; alternative metal
- Length: 45:01
- Label: Wind-up
- Producer: Jay Baumgardner

Seether chronology
Fragile (2000)	Disclaimer (2002)	Disclaimer II (2004)

Singles from Disclaimer
- 1. "Fine Again" Released: August 2002; 2. "Driven Under" Released: 4 March 2003; 3. "Gasoline" Released: 19 August 2003

Professional ratings
Review scores
Source	Rating
AllMusic	3/5 stars
Rolling Stone	3/5 stars

Disclaimer is the debut studio album by the South African rock band Seether. The album was released on 20 August 2002. It features three successful singles which would remain some of the band's most well-known songs. It is their first release under their current name after changing it from Saron Gas in 2002 to avoid confusion with the deadly nerve agent sarin gas.

== Background and release ==
A great deal of pre-production took place in South Africa with supervision from a Wind-up representative. It continued in New York City before the album recording sessions began in Los Angeles. Veteran session drummer Josh Freese filled the role in the studio before an audition took place at Leads Rehearsal Studio. Among sixteen others, Nick Oshiro auditioned and joined the band in 2001. Seether would also enlist guitarist Patrick Callahan in the fall of that year after performing alongside his then-current band in Philadelphia.

Disclaimer was released with ten different cover variations. These feature images from the "Fine Again" music video with people holding signs depicting a negative outlook or a poor situation in life. The concept to implement it through the album cover was headed by the video's director, Paul Feeder. According to bassist Dale Stewart:

"[Feeder] came up with the idea of the people bearing [sic] their souls and holding up the signs and we thought it was a good concept. It's kind of like a thread that runs through the whole album, the fragility, or whatever you want to call it, you know in people. People are always screwed up about something, even if they act like they're not."

In regards to recording and single output, the band allegedly faced a considerable deal of label pressure compared to future albums. According to a reflective Shaun Morgan in 2005:

"...With Disclaimer, we were still pretty green and all the say-so was made for us. We really didn't have much and most of those decisions, I felt, were bad ones. Last time around we had a manager from South Africa. She wasn't very good at what she was doing and she was letting [the record label] walk all over us."

According to Morgan, "the producer [Jay Baumgardner] was shit, so recording the album was a long process. The producer would come into the studio on Monday morning, after we worked for the entire week and say, 'nope, do it again'", partially because Baumgardner owned the studio and made a profit from them. As a result, the recording process for the album took three months, unlike later albums, which took around two weeks.

Seven of the tracks that appeared on their previous album Fragile appeared re-recorded on Disclaimer. They were "Gasoline", "69 Tea," "Fine Again," "Driven Under," "Pride," "Your Bore," and "Pig". "Gasoline" had originally been a bonus track on Fragile. Eventually, it became a single along with "Fine Again" and "Driven Under", which had preceded it.

== Songwriting ==
"69 Tea" was the first song that Shaun Morgan remembers writing. He has said:

"We'd written songs in bands prior to that. I mean, I wrote that when I was about fifteen or sixteen years old. So for me it was like, wow, this is just me by myself and nobody else. I spent a lot of my teenage years just in my room playing guitar. I used to have tapes and tapes of songs that I would just sit and record. Unfortunately, I've lost all of them but luckily some of them would stick with me and as the years went by, I'd show them to different bands and some of them managed to sort of hang in there. But that was the first one I remember writing. That was actually our first single in South Africa, which basically put us on the map. That's a pretty fond memory."

He also explained the song's meaning:

"Religion is not something that I talk about or that I care for people to know where I stand. In "69 Tea", there's a line that says, 'Save me smiling Jesus, get off that cross,' and that was overwhelmingly sarcastic. I wrote that when I was 16. It was something that was just there in front of me and that's the way I wanted to say it."

At the age of 23, Morgan experienced heartbreak, which inspired the song "Broken". Morgan's wife did not follow him from their homeland of South Africa to the United States, and chose to live in South Africa with their daughter. Morgan thus felt he lost his best chance to have the family experience he always wanted. He explained:

"I really wanted that family, and I really wanted to be part of that family unit. And I really thought this was going to be my nucleus and my happy place," Morgan lamented. "Ever since then I have had a hard time feeling like I'm worth anything. And ever since then I have had a problem caring. I feel like this emotional desert."

Morgan wrote the song "Gasoline" in five minutes during soundcheck, and the lyrics came out automatically. According to him, the song is about "MTV girls" and their fakeness.

One of Morgan's earliest memories is his mother waving a gun in his father's face, while he and his brother were locked in the bathroom. Later, his mother gave him a loaded .45 caliber gun in case of danger. "Driven Under" was inspired by these memories.

Asked about "Fade Away", he explained:

"Oh shit... I think "Fade Away" may be one of the most generic, terrible songs I ever wrote. I can't even listen to it anymore."

== Musical style ==
Disclaimer gained comparison to grunge acts such as Nirvana. According to AllMusic's Jason D. Taylor, the album "follows the path that bands such as Staind and Cold have capitalized on in the 21st century". He also states that the band's "moody rock edge borders on the formerly prominent grunge style once championed by another trio, Nirvana".

== Promotion ==
Beginning with "Fine Again" in late 2002, a total of three singles were released from Disclaimer. The lead single was followed by "Driven Under" in March 2003 and "Gasoline" in August. Each song was accompanied by a music video.

== Track listing ==
All tracks written by Shaun Morgan and Dale Stewart, except where noted

No.	Title	Length
1.	"Gasoline"	2:49
2.	"69 Tea"	3:31
3.	"Fine Again"	4:04
4.	"Needles"	3:26
5.	"Driven Under"	4:34
6.	"Pride"	4:07
7.	"Sympathetic"	4:07
8.	"Your Bore"	3:53
9.	"Fade Away"	3:53
10.	"Pig"	3:22
11.	"Fuck It"	2:58
12.	"Broken"	4:18
Total length:		45:01

2022 Deluxe Edition bonus tracks (disc 1)
No.	Title	Writer(s)	Length
13.	"Something in the Way" (Nirvana cover, live in the 99X Music Lounge, 2002)	Kurt Cobain	3:05
Total length:			48:06

2022 Deluxe Edition bonus tracks (disc 2 – Live at Hampton Beach Casino, 2003)
No.	Title	Length
1.	"Gasoline"	2:45
2.	"69 Tea"	3:22
3.	"Needles"	4:19
4.	"Pride"	4:36
5.	"Driven Under"	4:46
6.	"Your Bore"	4:59
7.	"Pig"	4:13
8.	"Sympathetic"	4:13
9.	"Fine Again"	4:34
10.	"Hang On" (would later appear on Daredevil: The Album and Disclaimer II)	3:52
11.	"Burrito" (would later appear on Karma and Effect)	4:23
12.	"Fuck It"	3:33
13.	"Broken"	3:58
Total length:		50:53

2022 Deluxe Edition bonus tracks (vinyl 2, side A)
No.	Title	Length
1.	"Gasoline" (Live at Hampton Beach Casino, 2003)	2:45
2.	"69 Tea" (Live at Hampton Beach Casino, 2003)	3:22
3.	"Needles" (Live at Hampton Beach Casino, 2003)	4:19
4.	"Pride" (Live at Hampton Beach Casino, 2003)	4:36
Total length:		14:22

2022 Deluxe Edition bonus tracks (vinyl 2, side B)
No.	Title	Length
1.	"Driven Under" (Live at Hampton Beach Casino, 2003)	4:46
2.	"Your Bore" (Live at Hampton Beach Casino, 2003)	4:59
3.	"Pig" (Live at Hampton Beach Casino, 2003)	4:13
Total length:		13:18

2022 Deluxe Edition bonus tracks (vinyl 3, side C)
No.	Title	Length
1.	"Sympathetic" (Live at Hampton Beach Casino, 2003)	4:13
2.	"Fine Again" (Live at Hampton Beach Casino, 2003)	4:34
3.	"Hang On" (Live at Hampton Beach Casino, 2003)	3:52
Total length:		11:59

2022 Deluxe Edition bonus tracks (vinyl 3, side D)
No.	Title	Writer(s)	Length
1.	"Burrito" (Live at Hampton Beach Casino, 2003)		4:23
2.	"Fuck It" (Live at Hampton Beach Casino, 2003)		3:33
3.	"Broken" (Live at Hampton Beach Casino, 2003)		3:58
4.	"Something in the Way" (Live at the 99X Music Lounge)	Cobain	3:05
Total length:			14:19

== Personnel ==
Seether

- Shaun Morgan – lead vocals, guitar
- Dale Stewart – bass, backing vocals
- Josh Freese – drums

Production

- Jay Baumgardner – production, mixing
- Dan Certa – engineer
- Tom Baker – mastering

== Charts ==
Chart (2002)	Peak position
The Billboard 200	92

== Certification ==
Region	Certification	Certified units/sales
United States (RIAA)	Gold	500,000^{^}
^{^} Shipments figures based on certification alone.
