= Saturday Night (Drowning Pool song) =

Single by Drowning Pool

from the album Resilience
- Released: November 13, 2012
- Studio: House of Loud Studios (Elmwood Park, New Jersey)
- Genre: Heavy metal
- Length: 3:53
- Label: Eleven Seven
- Songwriters: Stevie Benton; Mike Luce; Jasen Moreno; C.J. Pierce
- Producers: Kato Khandalla; John Feldmann

Drowning Pool singles chronology
"In Memory of..." (2012)	"Saturday Night" (2012)	"One Finger and a Fist" (2013)

Music video
- "Saturday Night" on YouTube

"Saturday Night" is a song by American rock band Drowning Pool. The song was released on November 13, 2012 off their album Resilience. The song is described as melodic and described as an anthem.

== Concept ==
In an interview with Noisecreep, bassist Stevie Benton said "The question I am most often asked is 'What's life on tour like?' This song is my best description of a typical day on the road".

== Music video ==
The music video shows the band playing in a house in front of a huge crowd during a party. It shows people partying, scantily clad women and people having fun. Eventually in the video, the police break up the party due to its intensity.

== Track listing ==
No.	Title	Length
1.	"Saturday Night"	3:53

== Personnel ==
- Stevie Benton – bass, backing vocals
- Mike Luce – drums
- Jasen Moreno – vocals
- C.J. Pierce – electric guitar, backing vocals

== Charts ==
Chart (2012–2013)	Peak position
US Mainstream Rock (Billboard)	33
