= One Finger and a Fist =

Single by Drowning Pool

from the album Resilience
- Released: January 29, 2013
- Genre: Alternative metal
- Length: 3:06
- Label: Eleven Seven
- Songwriters: Stevie Benton; Mike Luce; Jasen Moreno; C.J. Pierce

Drowning Pool singles chronology
"Saturday Night" (2012)	"One Finger and a Fist" (2013)	"By the Blood" (2015)

Music video
- "One Finger and a Fist" on YouTube

"One Finger and a Fist" is a song by American rock band Drowning Pool and the second single from the album Resilience. Being one of the first tracks with Jasen Moreno on lead vocals, the song was featured on WWE's Slammy Awards and offered as a free download in December 2012. A lyric video was created for the song in January 2013 with an official video premiered in February 2013.

== Charts ==
Chart (2013)	Peak position
US Mainstream Rock (Billboard)	29
