= Shame (Drowning Pool song) =

Single by Drowning Pool

from the album Full Circle
- Released: June 29, 2009
- Recorded: 2007
- Genre: Alternative metal
- Length: 3:10
- Label: Eleven Seven
- Songwriters: Stevie Benton; Mike Luce; Ryan McCombs; C.J. Pierce

Drowning Pool singles chronology
"37 Stitches" (2008)	"Shame" (2009)	"Feel Like I Do" (2010)

Music video
- "Shame" on YouTube

"Shame" is the last single from the Drowning Pool album Full Circle. The single and the music video were released early 2009. It hit #26 on the US Mainstream Rock Tracks. Shame was released as a single when they were working on their self-titled album. The single is featured on the Saw IV soundtrack.

== Music video ==
The music video was released at the same time as the single.

== Track listing ==
No.	Title	Length
1.	"Shame"	3:10
2.	"Shame (Video)"	3:15

Promo CD

No.	Title	Length
1.	"Shame" (Vocal Up Version)	3:11
2.	"Shame" (Album Version)	3:11
3.	"Shame" (Acoustic Version)	4:25

== Personnel ==
- Ryan McCombs - vocals
- C. J. Pierce - guitar
- Mike Luce - drums
- Stevie Benton - bass

== Chart positions ==
Year	Chart	Position
2009	US Main	26
