= Hellelujah =

Studio album by Drowning Pool
- Released: February 5, 2016
- Studio: Audio Hammer (Sanford, Florida)
- Genre: Alternative metal
- Length: 48:51
- Label: eOne
- Producer: Jason Suecof

Drowning Pool chronology
Resilience (2013)	Hellelujah (2016)	Strike a Nerve (2022)

Singles from Hellelujah
- 1. "By the Blood" Released: November 19, 2015; 2. "Snake Charmer" Released: December 18, 2015; 3. "Hell to Pay" Released: January 8, 2016

Professional ratings
Review scores
Source	Rating
AllMusic	3/5 stars
Blabbermouth.net	8/10
Metal Injection	7/10
Ultimate Guitar	5.2/10

Hellelujah is the sixth studio album by American rock band Drowning Pool. Produced by Jason Suecof, It was released on February 5, 2016, by eOne Music. "By the Blood", the first single from the album, was released on November 19, 2015, while the album artwork was revealed the following day. It is the second Drowning Pool album recorded with vocalist Jasen Moreno.

Three singles were released before the album's release: "By the Blood", "Snake Charmer" and "Hell to Pay".

== Track listing ==
All tracks are written by Drowning Pool.

No.	Title	Length
1.	"Push"	3:13
2.	"By the Blood"	3:27
3.	"Drop"	3:41
4.	"Hell to Pay"	4:01
5.	"We Are the Devil"	4:05
6.	"Snake Charmer"	3:47
7.	"My Own Way"	3:33
8.	"Goddamn Vultures"	3:53
9.	"Another Name"	3:41
10.	"Sympathy Depleted"	3:31
11.	"Stomping Ground"	3:40
12.	"Meet the Bullet"	4:00
13.	"All Saints Day"	4:19
Total length:		48:51

== Personnel ==
Drowning Pool

- Jasen Moreno – vocals
- C.J. Pierce – guitars
- Stevie Benton – bass
- Mike Luce – drums

Production

- Jason Suecof – producer, engineer, mixing
- Audio Hammer Studios – primary production studio
- RavensNest Studio – additional production studio
- C.J. Pierce – additional production and engineering
- John Douglass – mix engineer, additional engineering
- Alan Douches – mastering
- West West Side – mastering location
- Brian Mercer – album cover design
- Paul Grosso – creative direction
- Sean Marlowe – art direction and design
- Colt Coan – photography

== Singles ==
List of singles, with selected chart positions and certifications, showing year released and album name
Title	Year	Peak chart positions
Title	Year	US Main. Rock
"By the Blood"	2015	33
"Snake Charmer"	2015	—
"Hell to Pay"	2016	—
"—" denotes a recording that did not chart or was not released in that territory.
