= Resilience (Drowning Pool album) =

Studio album by Drowning Pool
- Released: April 9, 2013
- Recorded: 2012
- Studios: House of Loud Studios (Elmwood Park, New Jersey)
- Genres: Alternative metal; hard rock; post-grunge
- Length: 39:34 (standard edition); 46:41 (deluxe edition); 54:36 (digital deluxe edition)
- Label: Eleven Seven
- Producers: Kato Khandwala; John Feldmann

Drowning Pool chronology
Drowning Pool (2010)	Resilience (2013)	Hellelujah (2016)

Singles from Resilience
- 1. "In Memory Of..." Released: August 14, 2012; 2. "Saturday Night" Released: November 13, 2012; 3. "One Finger and a Fist" Released: January 29, 2013; 4. "Anytime Anyplace" Released: March 18, 2013

Resilience is the fifth studio album by American rock band Drowning Pool. It was released on April 9, 2013, and is the first Drowning Pool album recorded with vocalist Jasen Moreno. The album was also made available for download from iTunes and in MP3 format on Amazon.

== Style and themes ==
The album features a much more aggressive and anthemic sound than their previous material. It is primarily an alternative metal and hard rock album, but with hints of post-grunge. Its lyrical themes include partying ("Saturday Night"), confrontation, resistance, anger ("One Finger and a Fist") and other similar themes.

== Singles ==
Three singles have been released from the album so far. The first single, "In Memory Of..." was dedicated to their original vocalist Dave Williams and was released on August 14, 2012, on the 10th anniversary of his death. The next single, "Saturday Night" was released on November 13, 2012. The third, "One Finger and a Fist", was released on January 29, 2013.

== Production and background ==
The album was recorded at the House of Loud Studios in New Jersey and it was then finished up in Dallas. The album was also produced by Kato Khandwalla. In a post on the band's official Facebook page, guitarist C.J. Pierce wrote,

It's been a real pleasure for all of us working with Jasen Moreno. He jumped right in and stepped up to the plate. He's everything we hoped for in a singer. Jasen came in and got straight to work on new music for our next CD. Out of respect to all past singers, and most importantly the Drowning Pool fans, he learned every song from every CD we've made in the past as well. Jasen has brought us not only a new voice but a new fire to the Drowning Pool sound. We all can't wait to get the new music out to there to everyone with the live show.

In an interview in September 2012 with Guitar World, Jasen Moreno said

"I am extremely happy and very grateful to be a part of the Drowning Pool family. Everyone's been so welcoming, especially the fans. I can't praise them enough. They've made me feel right at home. This first run of live shows couldn't have gone any better!

== Critical reception ==
Professional ratings
Review scores
Source	Rating
AllMusic	3/5 stars
Revolver	3.5/5

Resilience has received mixed reviews. Revolver magazine criticized "One Finger and a Fist" for being "full of unconvincing declarations of being "hardcore", and "Saturday Night" for being "an awkward attempt at a party song" but described "Anytime Anyplace", "Life of Misery" and "Broken Again" as songs that "blow through the front door like an angry bull." Metal Storm described Jasen as a worthy replacement for Ryan McCombs, as well as describing "Life of Misery" as the album's strongest track. Shyam Rajdev from Sound and Motion was very positive towards the album and describes its solos as "incredible" and regards Jasen Moreno's vocals as the highlight of the album.

== Track listing ==
All tracks are written by Drowning Pool, except "One Finger and a Fist" and "Bleed with You", written by Drowning Pool and John Feldmann.

No.	Title	Length
1.	"Anytime Anyplace"	3:36
2.	"Die for Nothing"	3:12
3.	"One Finger and a Fist"	3:06
4.	"Digging These Holes"	3:48
5.	"Saturday Night"	3:53
6.	"Low Crawl"	3:39
7.	"Life of Misery"	3:50
8.	"Broken Again"	3:19
9.	"Understand"	3:41
10.	"Bleed with You"	3:30
11.	"Skip to the End"	3:38
Total length:		39:34

Deluxe edition
No.	Title	Length
12.	"In Memory Of..."	3:56
13.	"Blindfold"	3:11
Total length:		46:41

Digital deluxe edition
No.	Title	Length
12.	"In Memory Of..."	3:56
13.	"Blindfold"	3:11
14.	"Apathetic"	3:56
15.	"One Way Prophecy"	3:59
Total length:		54:36

Deluxe edition bonus DVD
No.	Title	Length
1.	"Saturday Night (Music Video)"	4:01
2.	"One Finger and a Fist (Music Video)"	3:33
3.	"Sinner (Live Studio Session)"	2:53
4.	"Bodies (Live Studio Session)"	4:04
5.	"Tear Away (Live Studio Session)"	4:28
6.	"Told You So (Live Studio Session)"	3:27
7.	"Think (Live Studio Session)"	3:46
8.	"Step Up (Live Studio Session)"	3:40
9.	"Feel Like I Do (Live Studio Session)"	3:51
10.	"Saturday Night (Live Studio Session)"	4:02

== Personnel ==
Drowning Pool

- Jasen Moreno – lead vocals
- C.J. Pierce – guitar
- Stevie Benton – bass guitar
- Mike Luce – drums

Additional personnel

- Kato Khandwala – production and engineering (1, 2, 4-9, 11-13)
- John Feldmann – production, engineering, and mixing (3, 10)
- Dan Korneff – mixing (1, 2, 4-9, 11-13)
- Tommy English – additional production, mixing, and engineering (3, 10)
- Fred Kevorkian – mastering
- David Jackson – cover art and photography
- Trevor Niemann – album artwork design
