= Desensitized (Drowning Pool album) =

Studio album by Drowning Pool
- Released: April 20, 2004
- Recorded: December 2003 – March 2004
- Genres: Nu metal; hard rock
- Length: 38:38
- Label: Wind-up
- Producer: Johnny K

Drowning Pool chronology
Sinner (2001)	Desensitized (2004)	Full Circle (2007)

Singles from Desensitized
- 1. "Step Up" Released: June 22, 2004; 2. "Love and War" Released: 2004; 3. "Killin' Me" Released: 2004

Professional ratings
Review scores
Source	Rating
AllMusic	3/5 stars
Entertainment Weekly	B−

Desensitized is the second studio album by American rock band Drowning Pool. It was their first album since the death of vocalist Dave Williams as well as the only album to feature replacement vocalist Jason Jones. The album debuted at number 17 on the Billboard 200 chart. The album cover features porn star Jesse Jane.

Jones left the band soon after the album's release because of personal and musical differences. "Step Up" was featured in the 2004 superhero film The Punisher and was the theme song for WWE's WrestleMania XX. It was also featured in the compilation album MTV2 Headbangers Ball, Vol. 2.

== Writing and recording ==
Writing for the album began in 2003. Recording began towards the end of the year and was finished in March 2004.

Jason Jones said most of his songs are about the struggle when he was living as a homeless man. Jones stated that "People were like, 'Look at this fucking homeless guy.'" Further, "It's a struggle, man, and a lot of my songs are about the struggle."

Of "Cast Me Aside", Jason Jones remarked: "You get a rash of calls from people you haven't heard from in 10-12 years who are suddenly wanting to kick it again. I was like "Where the fuck were you?" You know... that whole shit of everyone loves you when you're on top kinda thing."

== Track listing ==
All tracks are written by S. Benton, J. Jones, M. Luce, and C. J. Pierce.

No.	Title	Length
1.	"Think"	3:32
2.	"Step Up"	3:17
3.	"Numb"	3:31
4.	"This Life"	3:44
5.	"Nothingness"	3:25
6.	"Bringing Me Down"	3:08
7.	"Love and War"	3:39
8.	"Forget"	3:23
9.	"Cast Me Aside"	4:13
10.	"Killin' Me"	3:08
11.	"Hate"	3:42
Total length:		38:38

== Personnel ==
Drowning Pool

- Stevie Benton – bass
- Jason Jones – vocals
- Mike Luce – drums
- C. J. Pierce – guitar

Production

- Produced and recorded by Johnny K
- Mixed by Randy Staub
- Additional engineering by Tadpole and James Murray
- Assistant engineer at Groovemaster Recording: James Winans
- Assistant engineers at Ocean Studios: Jason Cupp and Alex Pavlides
- Assistant engineer at Armoury Studios: Misha Rajaratnam
- Guitar tech: Tony McQuaid
- Recorded at Groovemaster Recording in Chicago, Illinois, and Ocean Studios in Burbank, California
- Mixed at Armoury Studios in Vancouver, Canada
- Mastered by Tom Baker at Precision Mastering in Hollywood, California
- Demos / Pre-production by Ben Schigel at Last Beat Studios in Dallas, Texas
- Band photos: Clay Patrick McBride
- Cover star: Jesse Jane
- Art direction: Ed Sherman

== Charts ==
Chart performance for Desensitized
Chart (2004)	Peak position
Australian Albums (ARIA)	62
Canadian Albums (Nielsen SoundScan)	61
Scottish Albums (Official Charts)	89
UK Albums (Official Charts)	66
UK Rock & Metal Albums (Official Charts)	4
US Billboard 200	17
