= Jason Jones (musician) =

American musician, singer and songwriter

Jason "Gong" Jones
- Born: Columbia, South Carolina, U.S.
- Origin: Los Angeles, California, U.S.
- Genres: Alternative metal; hard rock; nu metal; heavy metal
- Occupations: Musician; singer; songwriter; tattoo artist
- Instruments: Vocals; guitar
- Years active: 1995–present
- Labels: Burnhill Union Records
- Member of: Scumbag Allstars
- Formerly of: Drowning Pool; AM Conspiracy; Motorhick

Jason "Gong" Jones is an American musician, singer and songwriter. He was the frontman and vocalist of rock band Drowning Pool from 2003 to 2005, providing vocals for the band's 2004 album Desensitized after Dave Williams' death. He is the lead vocalist with the band AM Conspiracy. He is currently also involved in a side project called Scumbag Allstars.

== Career ==
=== Drowning Pool: 2003–2005 ===
In 2003, Jason Jones was recruited by Texas-based metal band Drowning Pool (at the time C. J. Pierce, Stevie Benton, and Mike Luce) after the loss of their original frontman Dave Williams, who died of hypertrophic cardiomyopathy while on the Ozzfest tour in August 2002.

Jones took the position as the band's frontman from 2003 to 2005. In that time period, he helped the band record their second full-length album Desensitized (2004), which brought hit songs such as "Step Up" (used for the motion picture The Punisher and the theme song for WWE WrestleMania XX), and the minor hits "Love and War" and "Killin' Me". Jones also recorded "Rise Up" from the WWE ThemeAddict: The Music, Vol. 6 album in 2004.

In 2005, Jones left the band due to musical differences and personal reasons. Around 2008, during an interview with Altitude, Jones mentioned his reasons to leave Drowning Pool:

I left Drowning Pool because I wasn't really getting paid for the work I was doing at all whatsoever and wasn't really happy with the music and definitely wasn't happy with the guys, if you wanna know the honest truth. So, actually, I was off for a moment, I was in Florida and I saw these guys play, and I was like, 'Wow, this is so much fucking better. These guys can actually play their instruments,' and so I jumped in on it, man.

In reply to this remark, Pierce and Benton stated that the reason why Jones was not paid was because the band had to bail him out of jail for between $60,000 and $65,000, which surpassed his share for the revenue of Desensitized.

In late 2020, during an interview with podcaster Scott Bowling, Jones recalled the day he left the band, when he found a woman "doing a bunch of blow" in the band bus, for which he embroiled into an argument with C.J. Pierce as Jones tried to lead the woman out of the bus.

Dino Cazares had his eye on Jones to form a new band after his own folded but the project never took place.

=== AM Conspiracy: 2006–2012 ===
After leaving Drowning Pool, Jones formed the alternative metal group AM Conspiracy. The band's self-titled debut album was released on January 12, 2010.

== Discography ==
=== Drowning Pool ===
- Desensitized (2004)

=== AM Conspiracy ===
- Out of the Shallow End EP (2007)
- AM Conspiracy (2010)

=== Motorhick ===
- "Pedal to the Metal" (2014) - single
