= 37 Stitches =

2008 single by Drowning Pool

Single by Drowning Pool

from the album Full Circle
- Released: August 2008
- Genre: Post-grunge
- Length: 3:46
- Label: Eleven Seven
- Songwriters: Stevie Benton; Mike Luce; Ryan McCombs; C.J. Pierce

Drowning Pool singles chronology
| "Enemy" (2007) | "37 Stitches" (2008) | "Shame" (2009) |

Music video
- "37 Stitches" on YouTube

"37 Stitches" is a song by American rock band Drowning Pool and the third single from their third studio album Full Circle. It was Drowning Pool's first-ever top 5 hit on the Billboard Hot Mainstream Rock Tracks chart and was available for free in the iPhone OS application Tap Tap Revenge 2. It was the first song to appear on the Rock Songs chart, peaking at number 42.

With its echoed guitar and clean vocals, "37 Stitches" has an overall mellow and moody atmosphere compared to previous singles. Possibly referring to the song, the drummer Mike Luce said in an interview, "We have got some old school typical Drowning Pool high energy music. But then you got some more mainstream Alice in Chains acoustic rock".

Number 37 is an homage to Ryan McCombs' father. Ryan McCombs said in an interview, "I wrote the song "37 Stitches" back when I was in Drowning Pool, and it was kinda an homage to my dad. When I was growing up, everything was always 37. 'How much farther? 37 miles'. 'How old do you think he is? He's 37 years old'. This is my dad's number, yeah".

== Track listing ==
| No. | Title | Length |
|---|---|---|
| 1. | "37 Stitches" | 3:52 |

== Charts ==
| Chart (2008) | Peak position |
|---|---|
| US Mainstream Rock (Billboard) | 5 |
| US Hot Rock & Alternative Songs (Billboard) | 42 |
