= Dave Williams (singer) =

American singer (1972–2002)

- Williams performing in 2002

Background information
- Also known as: Stage
- Born: David Wayne Williams; February 29, 1972; White Plains, New York, U.S.
- Origin: Princeton, Texas, U.S.
- Died: August 14, 2002 (aged 30) Manassas, Virginia, U.S.
- Genres: Nu metal; alternative metal
- Occupations: Singer; songwriter
- Instrument: Vocals
- Years active: 1988–2002
- Label: Wind-up
- Formerly of: Drowning Pool; Fugly

David Wayne Williams (February 29, 1972 – August 14, 2002) was an American singer best known as the original lead vocalist for the rock band Drowning Pool.

== Biography ==
Williams grew up in Princeton, Texas, living with his parents Charles Edward and Jo-Ann Williams. He grew up in a pious family that caused him to move away from religion. Notably, he also used to wear a T-shirt that read "Worship Satan and Smoke Crack". He idolized David Lee Roth and Vince Neil for their public personas.

In 1999, he joined Drowning Pool, which had formed in 1996 and had previously performed as an instrumental three-piece. The band released their debut album with Williams, Sinner, in 2001. Williams soon gained recognition for his performances with the band; his nickname "Stage" came from Pantera guitarist Dimebag Darrell, who gave it to him because of his known stage personality.

== Death ==
On August 14, 2002, Williams was found dead in the band's tour bus in Manassas, Virginia. The band was traveling with Ozzfest and set to play in nearby Bristow the next day. An autopsy established that he had died from heart failure caused by hypertrophic cardiomyopathy (heart muscle disease), which went undiagnosed until his death.

A public funeral was held in Plano, Texas, on August 18, 2002, at 2:00 P.M. A DVD titled Sinema has since been released, chronicling his life. His lifelong dream was to buy his parents a house; the sales from Sinner fulfilled his dream posthumously.

Williams's microphone was given to Cristian Machado from Ill Niño. They were good friends, so Drowning Pool and Williams' family gave it to Machado as a token of respect after his death.

== Legacy ==
The Dallas, Texas music community honored Williams and his legacy with a multi-venue music festival named "Stage Fest". Stage Fest was held in downtown Dallas' Deep Ellum district on August 14, 2007, the fifth anniversary of his death, and played in seven Deep Ellum venues including Club Dada, The Curtain Club, The Lizard Lounge, The Darkside Lounge, Red Blood Club, Reno's Chop Shop, and Tomcat's.

One of Williams's previous bands, Fugly, digitally released an album dedicated to him in 2008.

On August 14, 2012, the 10th anniversary of his death, Drowning Pool released the ballad "In Memory Of..." dedicated to him.

For the 13th anniversary of Sinner, Bicycle Music Company released previously unreleased footage of Dave Williams and his bandmates answering questions about music, movies, and the Sinner album via their YouTube channel.
