= Drowning Pool =

American rock band

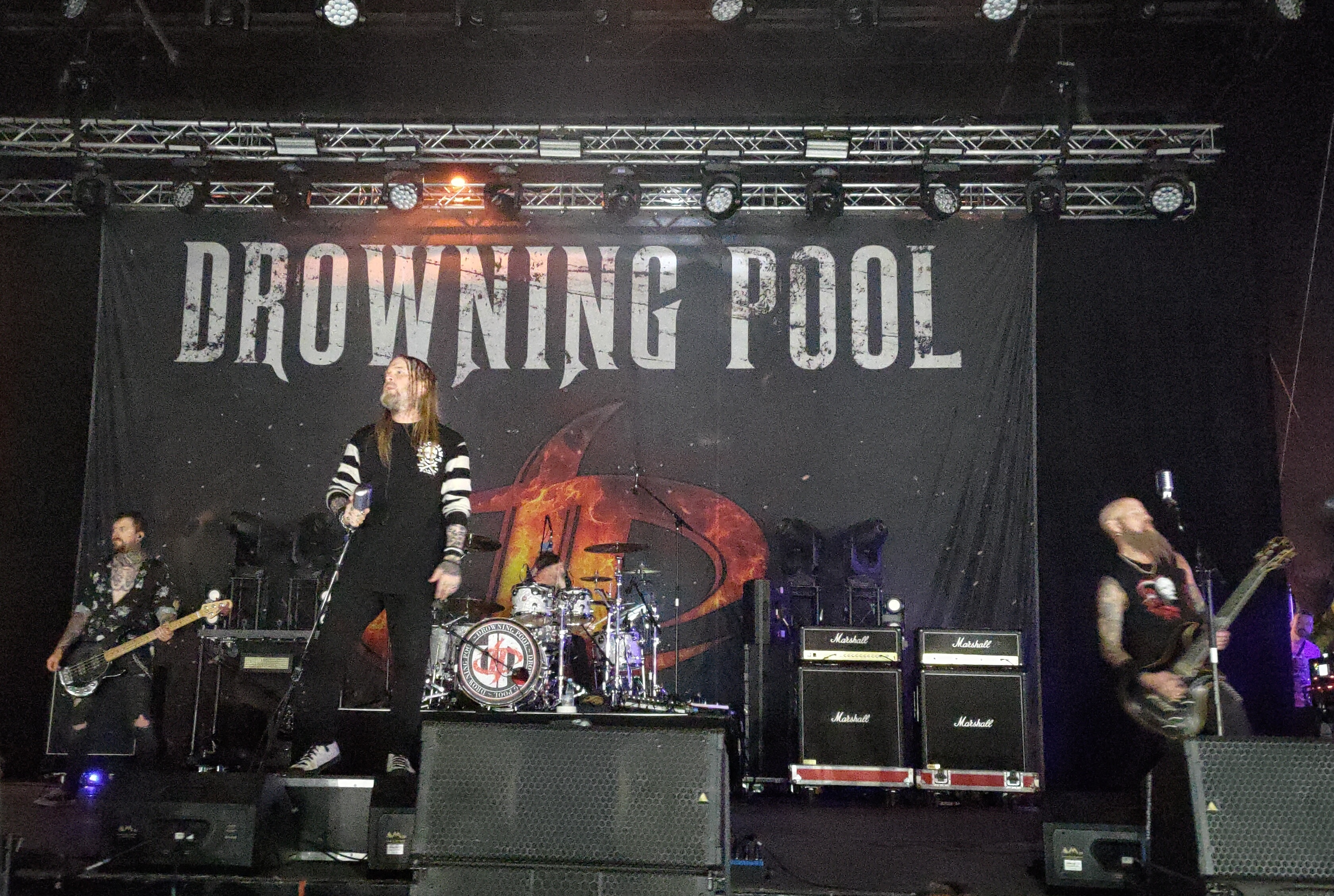
- Drowning Pool performing in Sulingen in 2025

Background information
- Origin: Dallas, Texas, U.S.
- Genres: Alternative metal; nu metal; hard rock; post-grunge
- Works: Drowning Pool discography
- Years active: 1996–present
- Labels: Wind-up; Eleven Seven; Entertainment One; Sanctuary
- Spinoffs: AM Conspiracy
- Members: Stevie Benton; Mike Luce; C.J. Pierce; Ryan McCombs
- Past members: Dave Williams; Jason Jones; Jasen Moreno
- Website: drowningpool.com

Drowning Pool is an American rock band formed in Dallas, Texas, in 1996. The band was named after the 1975 film The Drowning Pool. Since its formation, the band has consisted of guitarist C.J. Pierce, drummer Mike Luce and bassist Stevie Benton, as well as a revolving cast of vocalists.

After the release of their debut album, Sinner (2001), original vocalist Dave Williams was found dead on August 14, 2002, from heart disease. Jason Jones, who replaced Williams in 2003, recorded one album, Desensitized (2004), but left in 2005 due to musical differences. Ryan McCombs of Chicago-based band SOiL, later replaced Jones and released two albums, Full Circle (2007) and Drowning Pool (2010), making it the first time Drowning Pool did not switch singers after just one album. McCombs left the band in November 2011 to rejoin SOiL, and was replaced by Jasen Moreno, who performed on three albums with Drowning Pool – Resilience (2013), Hellelujah (2016) and Strike a Nerve (2022), making him the band's longest-serving vocalist. Moreno left Drowning Pool in March 2023 and was replaced by a returning McCombs.

== History ==
=== Early years (1996–2000) ===
Drowning Pool formed in Dallas, Texas, in 1996. Guitarist C.J. Pierce and drummer Mike Luce formed Drowning Pool after relocating from New Orleans, Louisiana, to Dallas. There, they found and recruited bassist Stevie Benton. For a few years they stuck to performing as an instrumental trio, but this all changed in 1999 with the arrival of vocalist Dave Williams. After recording a demo, Drowning Pool hooked up with Sevendust which got Drowning Pool in touch with Hed PE and Kittie. After touring with these bands, Drowning Pool got their demos enough radio play to get signed by Wind-up Records. The band made music with producer Jay Baumgardner.

=== Sinner, death of Dave Williams, and Desensitized (2001–2005) ===
Drowning Pool rose to fame with their debut album and played at the Ozzfest in 2001. Their 2001 debut album Sinner was certified platinum within six weeks. A number of songs from the album were featured at various WWE events that year, and three tracks would be included on the soundtrack for the Funimation dub of Dragon Ball Z: Cooler's Revenge in early 2002. The album featured "Bodies," which would become the band's most popular song.

On August 14 that year, Dave Williams was found dead inside his tour bus. He died from an undiagnosed heart condition, now known to be hypertrophic cardiomyopathy. When asked if the band had any unreleased songs, according to a 2002 Blabbermouth article, drummer Mike Luce replied that "only 3-4 songs were done, including one called "Heroes," which is a tribute to dead rock musicians such as Layne Staley. I don't know if we will ever release them."

In 2003, Jason 'Gong' Jones replaced Williams as Drowning Pool's vocalist and the band released the album Desensitized in 2004. Despite the success of the album's lead single, "Step Up", the album was not nearly as successful as Sinner, and it was publicly announced on June 14, 2005, that Jones had departed from the band, due to "irreconcilable differences".

=== Full Circle (2006–2008) ===
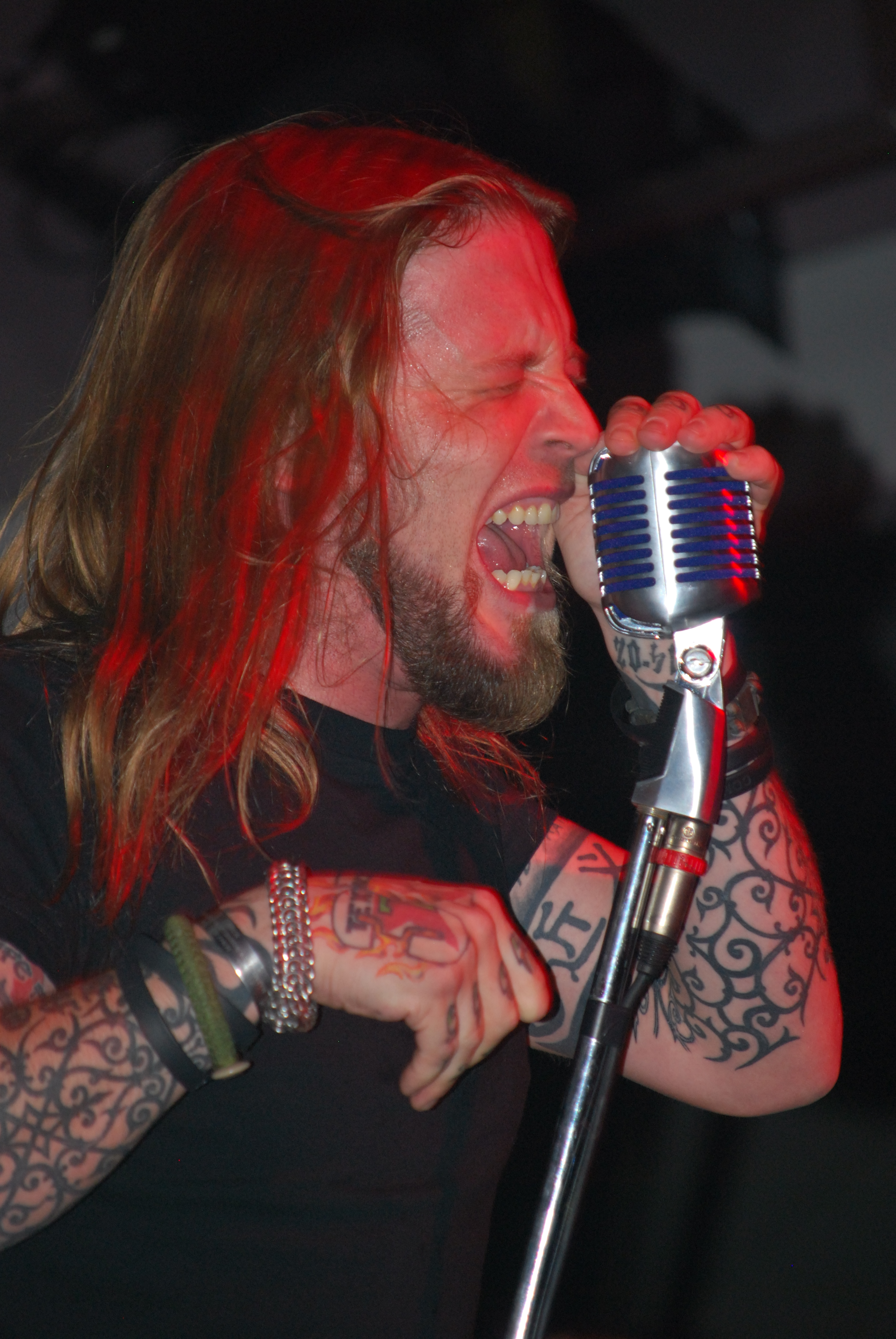
Drowning Pool's third vocalist, Ryan McCombs, performing with the band in November 2010

The band announced that their replacement singer would be formally announced at Ozzfest in Dallas, where the band did a one-off performance on the main stage. On July 20, 2005, the website SMNNews revealed that Ryan McCombs, then former singer of SOiL, was the new vocalist. The band initially wanted McCombs to join Drowning Pool as the replacement of Dave Williams, nearly two years prior. In spring of 2006, the band announced that they had parted ways with Wind-up Records. In October 2006, a new song "No More" was announced to be released on the Saw III soundtrack, their first song (besides a re-recorded version of "Rise Up") with McCombs. The bands recorded version of "Rise Up", was used as the theme song for WWE SmackDown from September 30, 2004 – September 26, 2008. The band signed a new deal with Eleven Seven Music and also announced a new management company, Tenth Street Entertainment. The band's third album, Full Circle, was released on August 7, 2007. Two songs on the album were produced by Funny Farm Records, owned by Mötley Crüe bassist Nikki Sixx and former Beautiful Creatures guitarist DJ Ashba. The remaining songs were produced by Ben Schigel at the Ohio-based Spider Studios. The band then toured with Saliva in North America and also Sick Puppies and Seether in support of the album.

=== Drowning Pool and departure of Ryan McCombs (2009–2011) ===
Later in the year, work on a fourth album was announced. On March 3, 2009, the band released a live album, Loudest Common Denominator, which featured acoustic versions of "Shame" and "37 Stitches" from Full Circle. The band finished recording their self-titled album with producer Kato Khandwala at House of Loud in New Jersey. It was the first studio album in the band's history not to feature a change of vocalist from the preceding album. The album's first single "Feel Like I Do", was released as a free download on their official website, and the album was released on April 27, 2010. On November 7, 2011, C.J. Pierce and Mike Luce announced a new project with former Nonpoint members Zach Broderick and Ken McMillan titled Voodoo Corps. In November 2011, McCombs left the band to reunite with SOiL for touring and a new album. The band, now once again without a singer, began writing new material for a fifth studio album while holding vocalist auditions.

=== Resilience and Hellelujah (2012–2016) ===
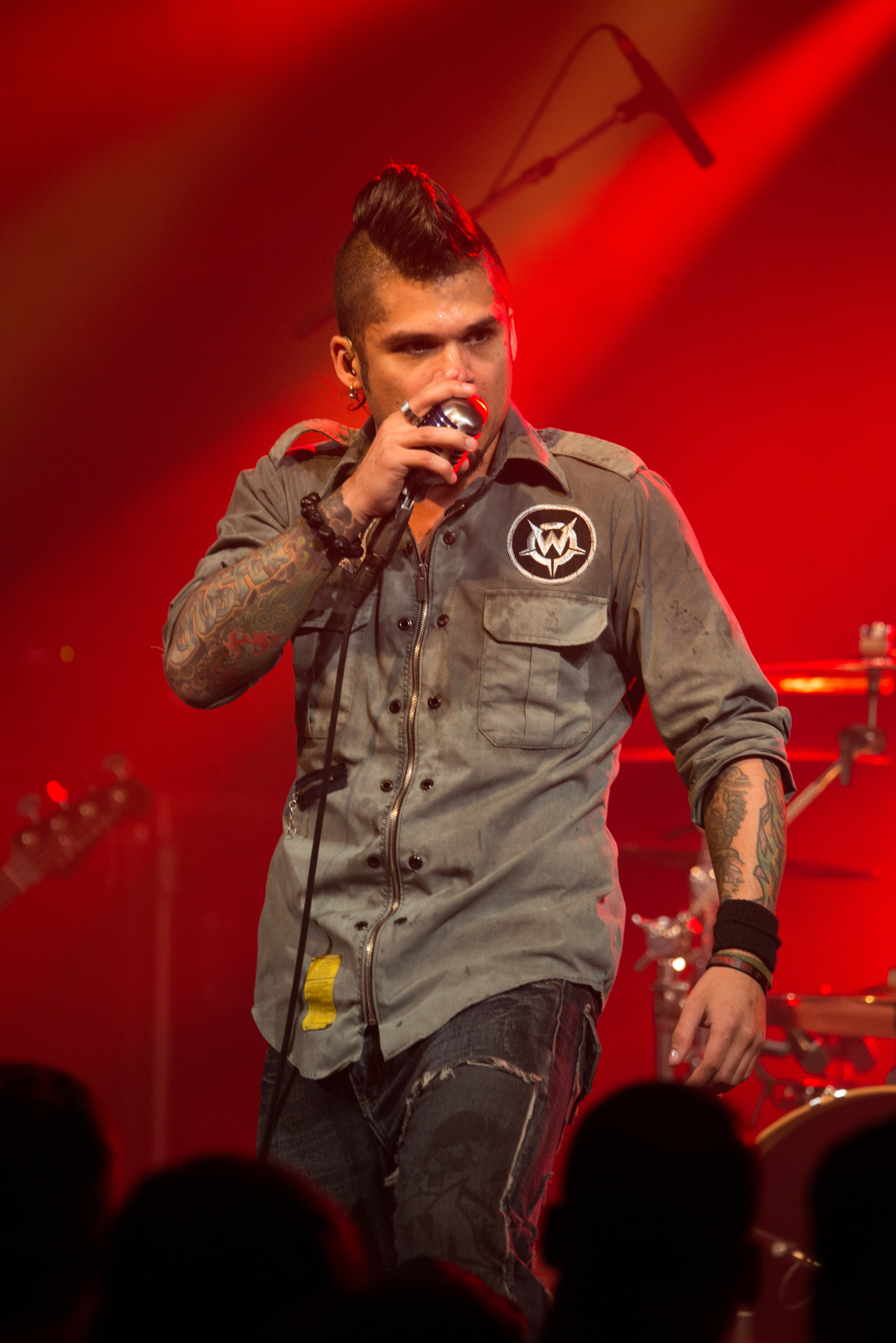
Former vocalist Jasen Moreno performing with the band in 2013. Moreno released three studio albums with the band, until his departure in 2023.

In July 2012, Jasen Moreno, from The Suicide Hook, was announced to be the band's new vocalist. On August 14, the 10th anniversary of Dave Williams' death, the band released a song in tribute of him, their first with Moreno titled "In Memory Of...". Two further singles were released with Moreno, "Saturday Night" in November 2012, and "One Finger and a Fist" in December 2012, before the band released their fifth album, Resilience, on April 9, 2013. On September 10, the band announced that they would celebrate the thirteenth anniversary of Sinner with a U.S. tour starting from October 22, in which they plan to dig deep into the songs from their debut album.

In 2013, the band was featured in an NME article titled "28 Nu-Metal Era Bands You Probably Forgot All About". They released a reissue of their album "Sinner" called the "Unlucky 13th Anniversary Edition" one year later in 2014.

The band signed to eOne Music in August 2015. On October 13, it was announced the band's sixth album titled Hellelujah would be released January 22, 2016, via eOne Music with producer Jason Suecof; the date was later postponed to February 5. "By the Blood" was released as the first single from the album.

On May 17, 2016, the band announced that they would be taking part in the Make America Rock Again super tour on select dates throughout the summer and fall 2016. The tour featured other artists who had success throughout the 2000s, including Trapt, Saliva, Saving Abel, Crazy Town, 12 Stones and Tantric, Fuel, Puddle Of Mudd and P.O.D.

=== Strike a Nerve (2017–2023) ===
In December 2017, it was reported that Drowning Pool had begun writing their seventh studio album. In an interview with 97.1 The Eagle, guitarist C.J. Pierce stated, "We're working on new songs right now, which is awesome. We're working on tunes for the next record. We have a bunch of stuff on the plate. Everybody's brought amazing stuff, material. The thing with this is just to try and go through and see what we're gonna do on the next record. So we'll hash out all the ideas and songs and then start narrowing it down. So it's nice to have more than enough to go through." The band began recording their new album in February 2019. Within the next three years, there had been no news regarding the state of the album. On February 16, 2022, Drowning Pool announced Strike a Nerve as the name of their seventh studio album, which had already been completed by early 2020, but the COVID-19 pandemic meant that its release date was then postponed.

Prior to the release of Strike a Nerve, Drowning Pool embarked on the North American tour Brothers in Arms with Ill Niño and (hed)p.e. in early 2022, and during this tour, they played two tracks from the upcoming album: "Strike a Nerve" and "Hate Against Hate". On August 5, 2022, the band announced the album would be released on September 30.

=== Reunion with Ryan McCombs (2023–present) ===
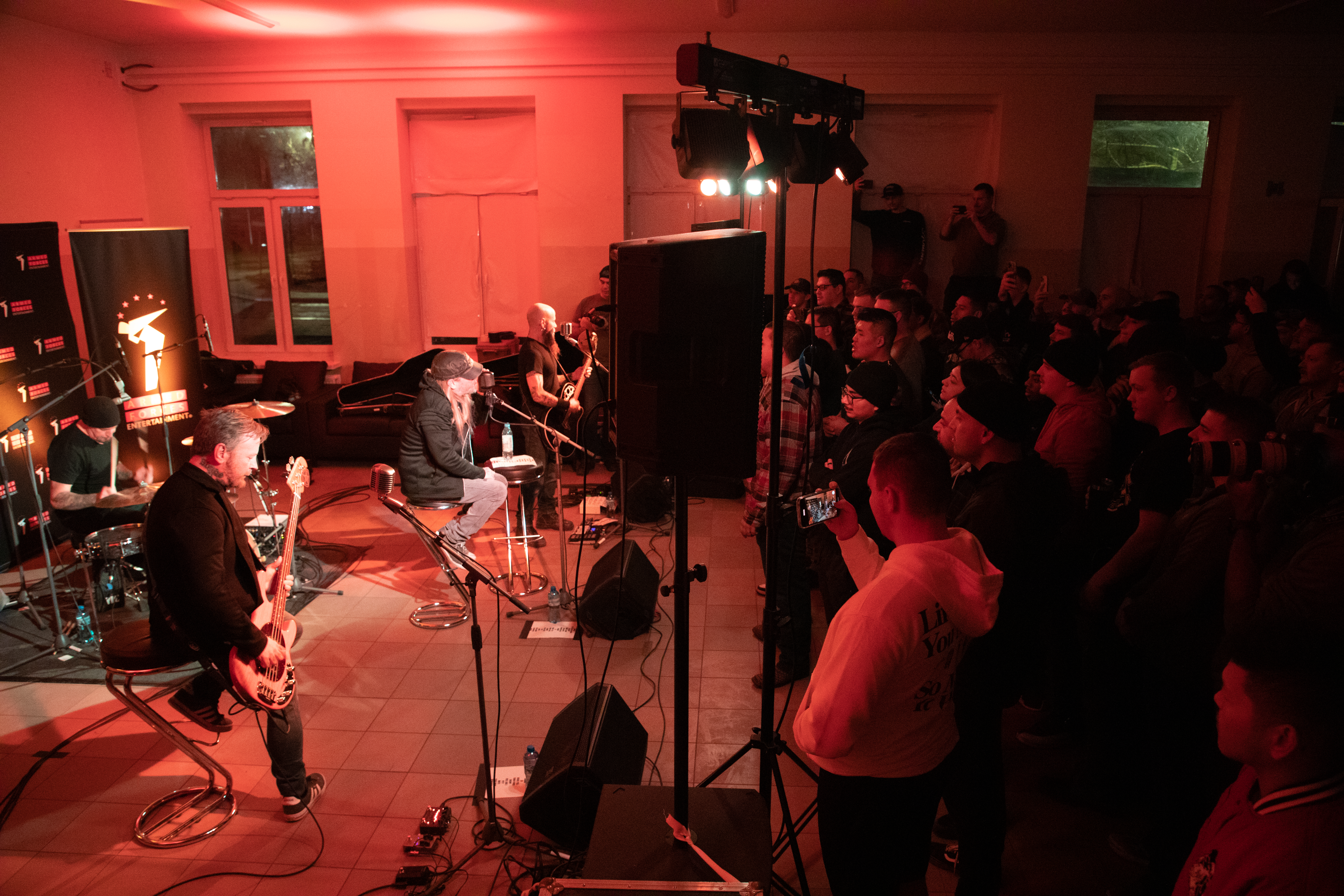
Drowning Pool performing for U.S. military personnel in 2023

On March 16, 2023, Drowning Pool announced that Ryan McCombs (while continuing his vocal duties with SOiL) had rejoined the band after a 12-year absence. Although they had planned to release new music with McCombs before the end of 2023, the year ended without any.

Drowning Pool released their first song with McCombs in 14 years, "Revolution (The Final Amen)", on September 20, 2024. This was followed in April 2025 by another one-off single "Madness", and ten months later by "The Wrong One", which saw the band collaborate with Sorry X. A new Drowning Pool album was supposed to be released in 2025, but it was since pushed back to 2026 and again to 2027.

The band was confirmed to be making an appearance at Welcome to Rockville, which took place in Daytona Beach, Florida in May 2026.

== Controversy ==
The band has faced some controversies and criticism due to the alleged misinterpretation of the lyrics to their most well-known song "Bodies". In 2011, the song was associated with the assassination attempt of Congresswoman Gabby Giffords. Shortly after the shooting, the band made a statement addressing the link: "We were devastated this weekend to learn of the tragic events that occurred in Arizona and that our music has been misinterpreted. 'Bodies' was written about the brotherhood of the moshpit and was never about violence." The band also added: "For someone to put out a video misinterpreting a song about a moshpit as fuel for a violent act shows just how sick they really are. We support those who do what they can to keep America safe. Our hearts go out to the victims and their families of this terrible tragedy".

"Bodies" was used consistently by interrogators at the Guantanamo Bay detention camps in 2003, and was consistently played over a 10-day period in 2006 during interrogations of Mohamedou Ould Slahi while he was "exposed to variable lighting patterns" at the same time.

== Musical style and influences ==
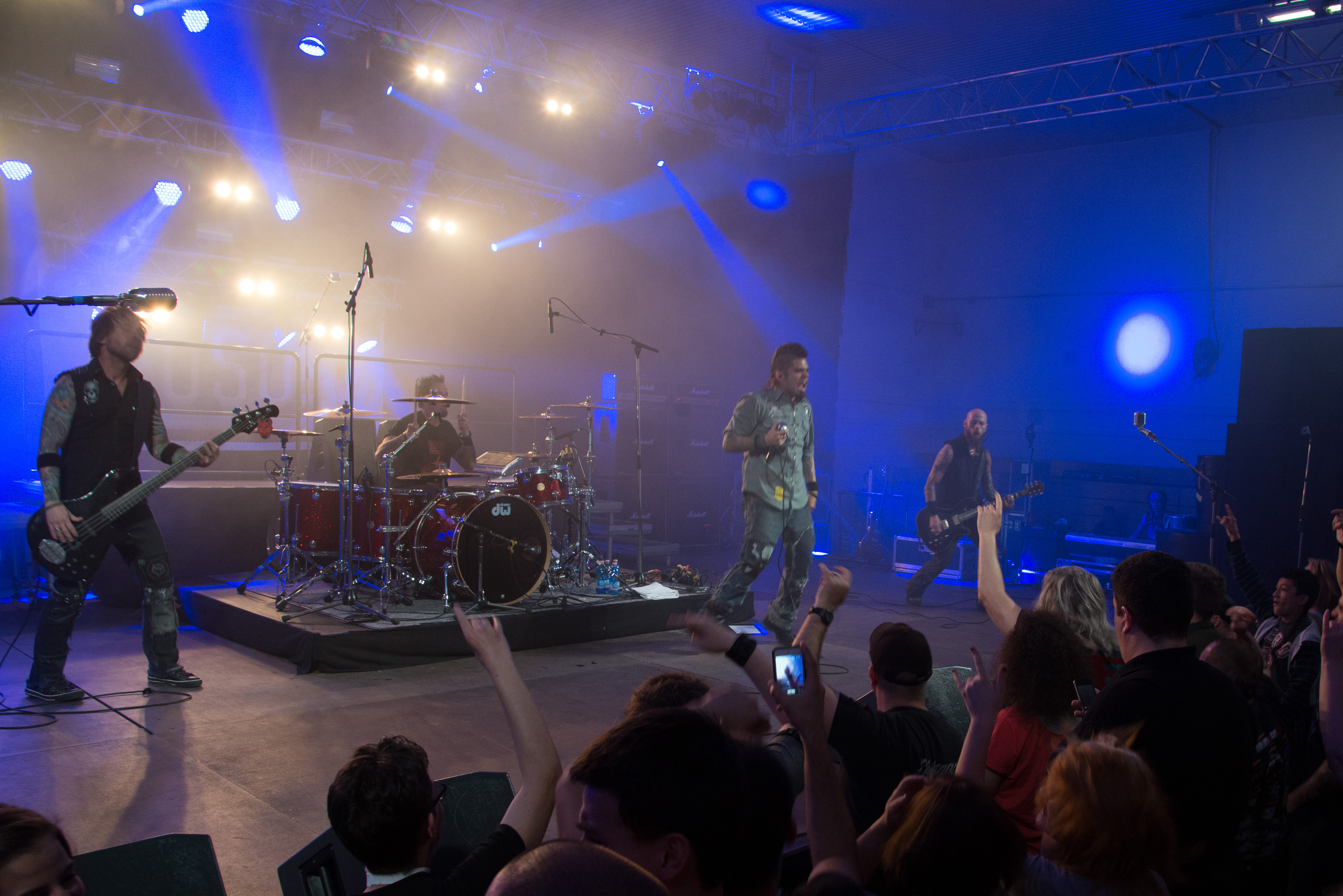
Drowning Pool performing in 2013

Drowning Pool's style has been considered alternative metal, nu metal, hard rock, and post-grunge, as well as being part of the new wave of American heavy metal. The band's influences include Metallica, Guns N' Roses, Anthrax, Testament, Slipknot, Alice in Chains, SOiL, Opeth, Nirvana, Soundgarden, Black Sabbath, Slayer, AC/DC, Led Zeppelin, Judas Priest, Iron Maiden, Mötley Crüe, the Beatles, Pantera, Sepultura and Suicidal Tendencies.

== Band members ==
Current members

- C. J. Pierce – guitars (1996–present), backing vocals (2003–present)
- Mike Luce – drums (1996–present), backing vocals (1999–present)
- Stevie Benton – bass (1996–present), backing vocals (2003–present)
- Ryan McCombs – lead vocals (2005–2011, 2023–present)

Former members

- Dave Williams – lead vocals (1999–2002; died 2002)
- Jason "Gong" Jones – lead vocals (2003–2005)
- Jasen Moreno – lead vocals (2012–2023)

Timeline

=== Gallery ===
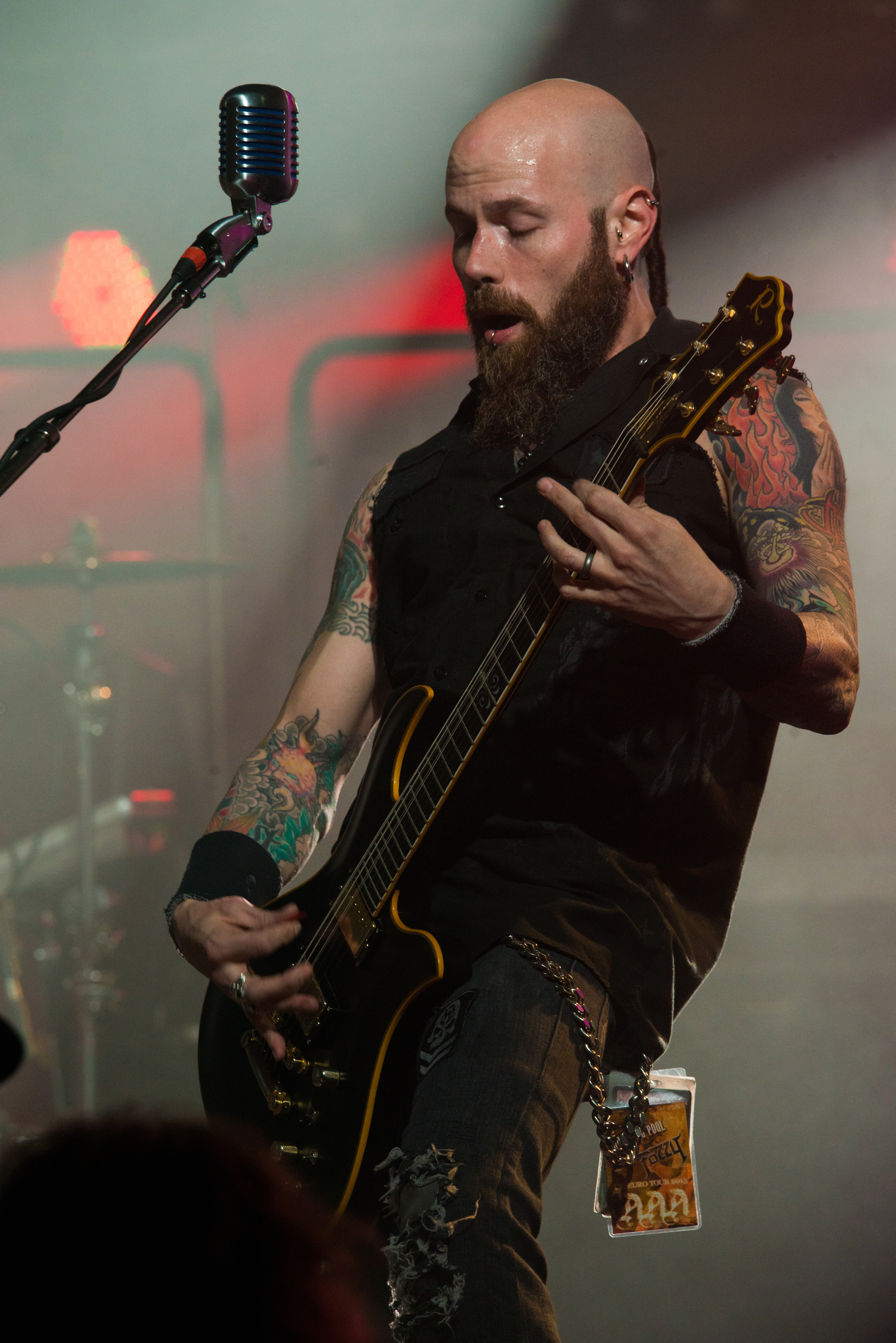
C.J. Pierce

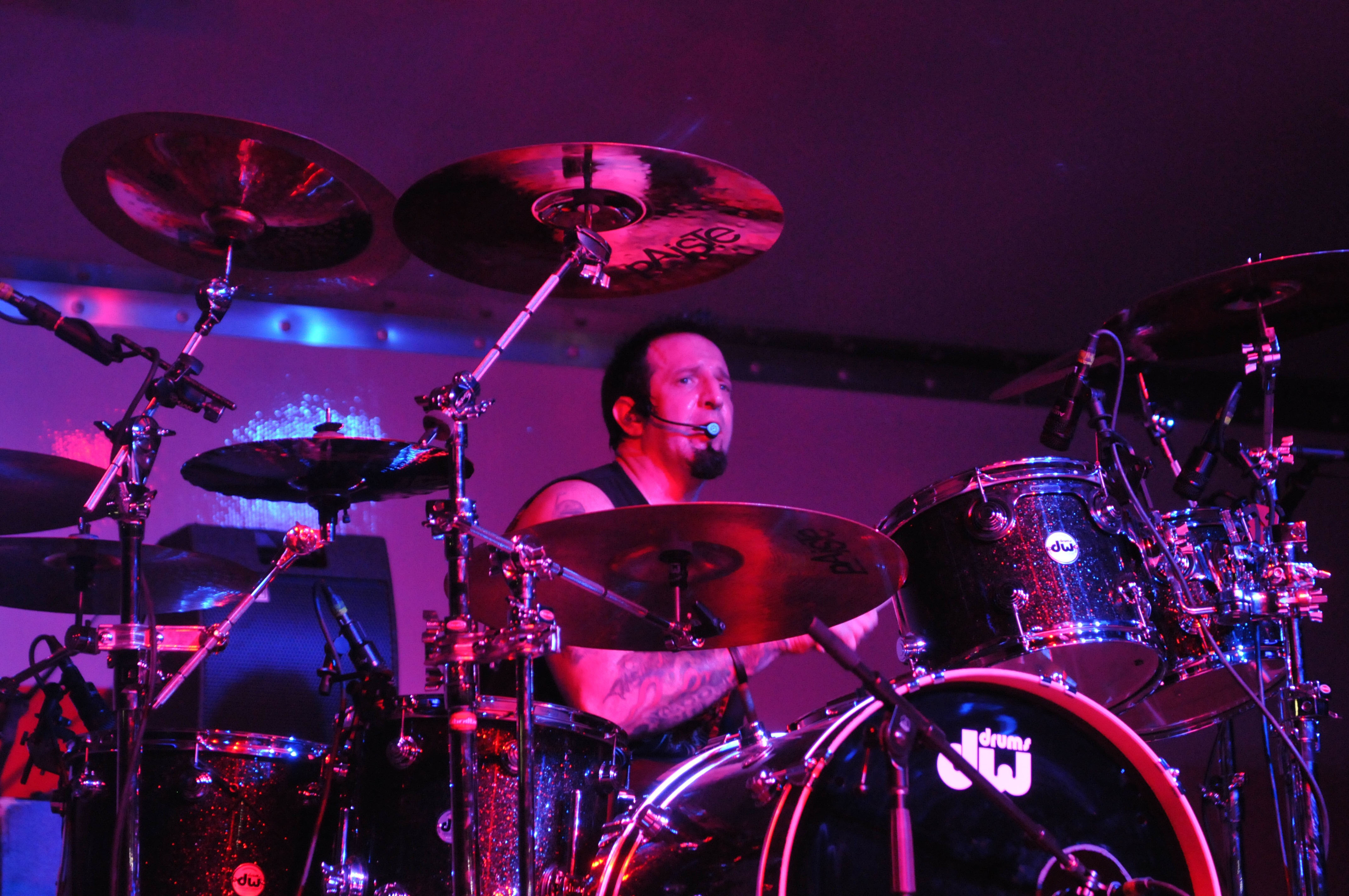
Mike Luce

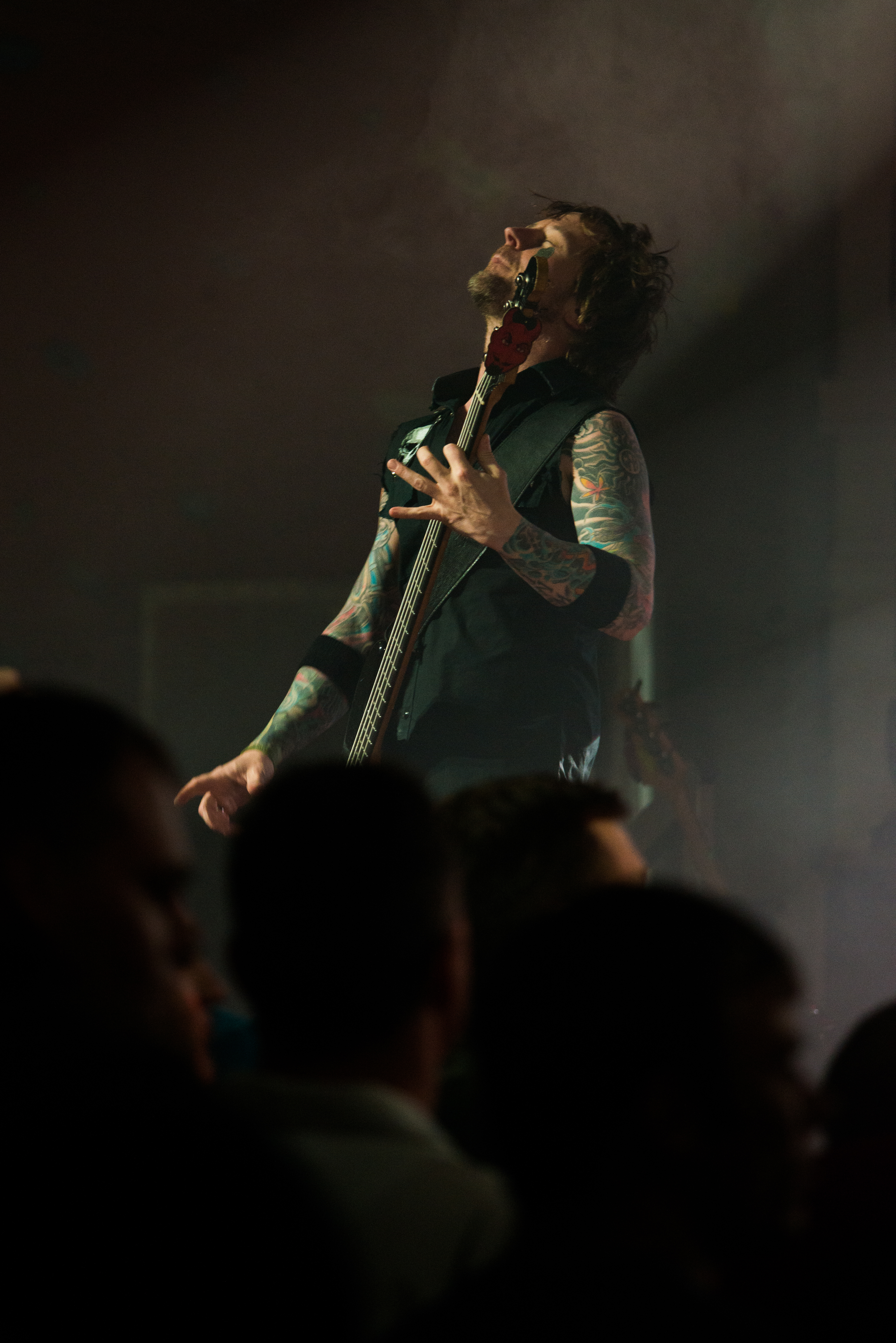
Stevie Benton

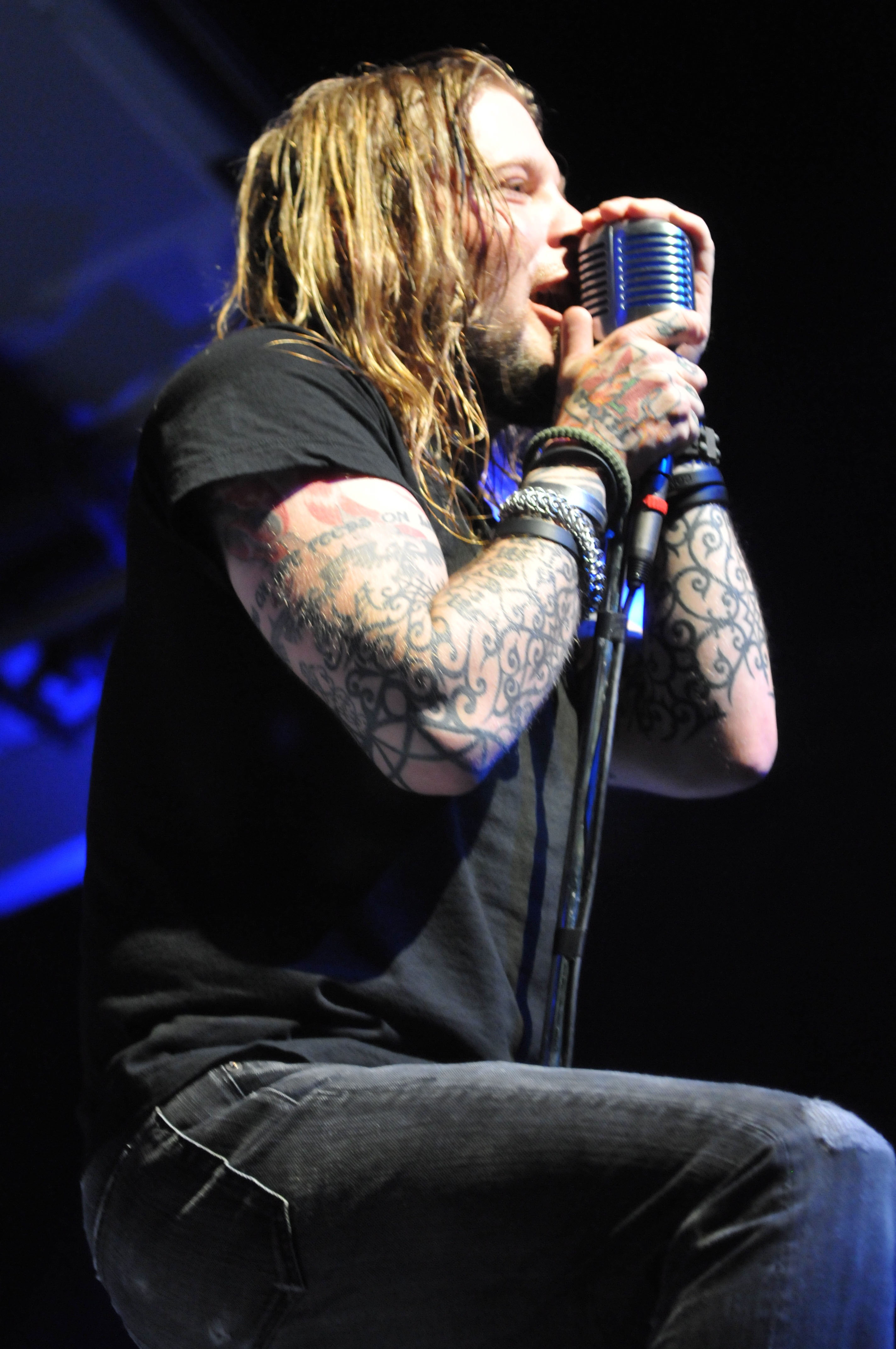
Ryan McCombs

== Discography ==
- Sinner (2001)
- Desensitized (2004)
- Full Circle (2007)
- Drowning Pool (2010)
- Resilience (2013)
- Hellelujah (2016)
- Strike a Nerve (2022)
