= Everclear discography =

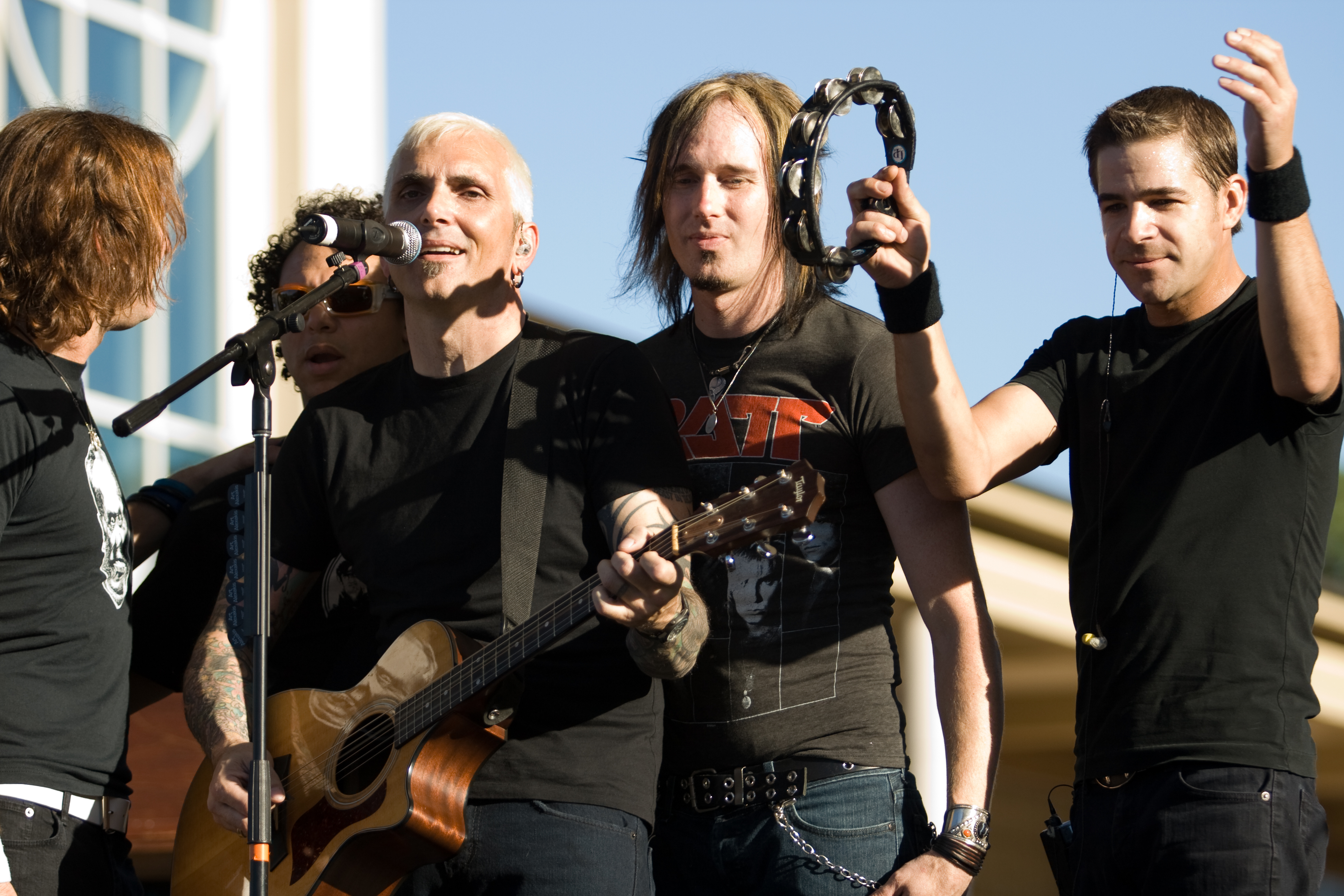
- Everclear performing in 2007
- Studio albums: 11
- Extended plays: 5
- Live albums: 1
- Compilation albums: 7
- Singles: 29

The discography of the American rock band Everclear consists of nine studio albums, one live album, seven compilation albums, five extended plays, and twenty-nine singles. Their first studio album, World of Noise, was released in 1993 and did not chart. Their second, 1995's Sparkle and Fade, peaked at number 25 in the United States and went platinum in both the US and Canada. Four singles were released from the album, including "Santa Monica", which reached number one on the Hot Mainstream Rock Tracks chart.

So Much for the Afterglow was released in 1997 and became Everclear's best-selling album, going two times platinum in the US and Canada. The singles "Everything to Everyone" and "I Will Buy You a New Life" both peaked in the top three of the alternative rock charts in the US and Canada, as well.

In 2000, the band released two albums: Songs from an American Movie Vol. One: Learning How to Smile and Songs from an American Movie Vol. Two: Good Time for a Bad Attitude. The former peaked in the top 10 in the US and Canada, and one of the singles from the album, "Wonderful", reached the top three of both the US and Canada alternative rock charts.

Everclear's next studio album, Slow Motion Daydream, was released in 2003. A single from that album, "Volvo Driving Soccer Mom" was their last single that charted. The band's first compilation album, Ten Years Gone: The Best of Everclear 1994–2004, was released in 2004.

In 2006, they released their seventh studio album, Welcome to the Drama Club, and their second compilation album, The Best of Everclear. Welcome to the Drama Club was their first studio album since World of Noise that did not reach the top 100 of the Billboard 200. Over the following years they released 2008's The Vegas Years, a compilation of cover songs, 2009's In a Different Light and 2011's Return to Santa Monica which featured re-recordings of past songs. In 2012 they released their eighth studio album, Invisible Stars, and in 2015, their ninth studio album, Black Is the New Black, was released. The band marked its 30th anniversary with their first live album, Live at the Whisky A Go Go, which was released in September 2023.

== Albums ==
=== Studio albums ===
Year	Album details	Peak chart positions						Sales	Certifications
Year	Album details	US	US Ind.	AUS	CAN	NZ	UK	Sales	Certifications
1993	World of Noise: Released: December 10, 1993; Label: Tim/Kerr; Formats: CD, LP, CS, DI	—	—	172	—	—	—		
1995	Sparkle and Fade: Released: May 23, 1995; Label: Capitol; Formats: CD, LP, CS, DI	25	—	9	39	20	—	US: 1,190,000+	RIAA: Platinum; ARIA: Platinum; MC: Platinum
1997	So Much for the Afterglow: Released: October 7, 1997; Label: Capitol; Formats: CD, LP, CS, DI	33	—	19	49	5	63	US: 2,200,000+	RIAA: 2× Platinum; ARIA: Gold; MC: 2× Platinum
2000	Songs from an American Movie Vol. One: Learning How to Smile: Released: July 11, 2000; Label: Capitol; Formats: CD, LP, CS, DI	9	—	31	2	29	51	US: 1,280,000+	RIAA: Platinum; MC: Platinum
2000	Songs from an American Movie Vol. Two: Good Time for a Bad Attitude: Released: November 21, 2000; Label: Capitol; Formats: CD, CS, DI	66	—	161	45	—	69	US: 285,000+	MC: Gold
2003	Slow Motion Daydream: Released: March 11, 2003; Label: Capitol; Formats: CD, CS, DI	33	—	85	43	—	154	US: 106,000+	
2006	Welcome to the Drama Club: Released: September 12, 2006; Label: Eleven Seven; Formats: CD, DI	169	11	—	—	—	—		
2012	Invisible Stars: Released: June 26, 2012; Label: eOne; Formats: CD, DI	119	21	—	—	5	—		
2015	Black Is the New Black: Released: April 24, 2015; Label: The End Records; Formats: CD, LP, CS, DI	—	11	—	—	9	—		
"—" denotes a release that did not chart.

=== Live albums ===
Year	Album details
2023	Live at the Whisky a Go Go: Released: September 8, 2023; Label: Capitol; Formats: CD, LP, DI

=== Compilation and other albums ===
Year	Album details	Peak chart positions
Year	Album details	US
2004	Ten Years Gone: The Best of Everclear 1994–2004: Released: October 5, 2004; Label: Capitol; Formats: CD, DI	182
2006	The Best of Everclear: Released: October 17, 2006; Label: Capitol; Formats: CD, DI	—
2008	The Vegas Years: Released: April 15, 2008; Label: Capitol; Formats: CD, DI	—
2009	In a Different Light: Released: October 6, 2009; Label: 429; Formats: CD, DI	—
2011	Return to Santa Monica: Released: September 27, 2011; Label: Cleopatra; Formats: CD, DI	—
2011	Greatest Hits: Released: December 27, 2011; Label: Cleopatra; Formats: DI	—
2014	The Very Best of Everclear: Released: May 13, 2014; Label: Cleopatra; Formats: LP	—
"—" denotes a release that did not chart.

== EPs ==
Year	EP details
1993	Nervous & Weird: Released: October 12, 1993; Label: Tim/Kerr; Formats: CD
1997	White Trash Hell: Released: March 24, 1997; Label: Fire; Formats: CD
1998	Live from Toronto: Released: August 8, 1998; Label: Capitol; Formats: CD
2004	Closure: Released: November 2, 2004; Label: Capitol; Formats: CD
2011	Extended Versions: Released: August 16, 2011; Label: Sony BMG; Formats: CD, DI

== Singles ==
Year	Song	Peak chart positions										Album
Year	Song	US	US Adult	US Alt.	US Main.	AUS	CAN	CAN Alt/Rock	NLD	NZ	UK	Album
1994	"Fire Maple Song"	—	—	—	—	—	—	—	—	—	—	World of Noise
1995	"Heroin Girl"	—	—	34	—	76	—	23	—	—	—	Sparkle and Fade
1995	"Santa Monica"	29^{[A]}	—	5	1	25	40	4	—	27	40	Sparkle and Fade
1996	"Heartspark Dollarsign"	85	—	13	29	40	—	12	—	—	48	Sparkle and Fade
1996	"You Make Me Feel Like a Whore"	—	—	—	—	97	—	—	—	—	—	Sparkle and Fade
1997	"Everything to Everyone"	43^{[B]}	—	1	15	40	25	1	—	—	41	So Much for the Afterglow
1997	"I Will Buy You a New Life"	33^{[C]}	20	3	20	—	49	1	—	—	—	So Much for the Afterglow
1998	"So Much for the Afterglow"	—	—	—	—	67	—	—	—	—	—	So Much for the Afterglow
1998	"Father of Mine"	70^{[D]}	23	4	29	140	50	—	—	—	—	So Much for the Afterglow
1999	"One Hit Wonder"	—	—	12	—	—	—	—	—	—	—	So Much for the Afterglow
1999	"The Boys Are Back in Town"	—	—	—	40	—	—	—	—	—	—	Detroit Rock City soundtrack
2000	"Wonderful"	11	3	3	28	38	12	1	—	21	36	Songs from an American Movie Vol. One: Learning How to Smile
2000	"AM Radio"	101^{[E]}	17	15	—	142	23	10	97	32	80	Songs from an American Movie Vol. One: Learning How to Smile
2000	"When It All Goes Wrong Again"	121^{[F]}	—	12	10	—	—	—	—	—	—	Songs from an American Movie Vol. Two: Good Time for a Bad Attitude
2001	"Out of My Depth"	—	—	34	—	—	—	—	—	—	—	Songs from an American Movie Vol. Two: Good Time for a Bad Attitude
2001	"Rock Star"	—	—	—	—	—	—	—	—	—	—	Songs from an American Movie Vol. Two: Good Time for a Bad Attitude
2001	"Brown Eyed Girl"	—	26	—	—	—	—	—	—	—	—	Songs from an American Movie Vol. One: Learning How to Smile
2003	"Volvo Driving Soccer Mom"	—	—	30	—	86	—	—	—	—	—	Slow Motion Daydream
2003	"The New York Times"	—	—	—	—	—	—	—	—	—	—	Slow Motion Daydream
2006	"Hater"	—	—	—	—	181	—	—	—	—	—	Welcome to the Drama Club
2007	"Glorious"	—	—	—	—	—	—	—	—	—	—	Welcome to the Drama Club
2008	"Rich Girl"	—	—	—	—	—	—	—	—	—	—	The Vegas Years
2008	"Jesus Was a Democrat"	—	—	—	—	—	—	—	—	—	—	Non-album single
2009	"At the End of the Day"	—	—	—	—	—	—	—	—	—	—	In a Different Light
2012	"Be Careful What You Ask For"	—	—	—	—	—	—	—	—	—	—	Invisible Stars
2015	"The Man Who Broke His Own Heart"	—	—	—	—	—	—	—	—	—	—	Black Is the New Black
2015	"American Monster"	—	—	—	—	—	—	—	—	—	—	Black Is the New Black
2022	"Year of the Tiger"	—	—	—	—	—	—	—	—	—	—	Live at the Whisky a Go Go
2024	"Sing Away"	—	—	—	—	—	—	—	—	—	—	Live at the Whisky a Go Go
"—" denotes a release that did not chart.

== Other appearances ==
Year	Album	Contributed song
1996	Music for Our Mother Ocean	"Hateful"
1996	Jabberjaw...Pure Sweet Hell	"How Soon Is Now?"
1997	Scream 2: Music From the Dimension Motion Picture	"The Swing"
1997	William Shakespeare's Romeo + Juliet: Music from the Motion Picture	"Local God"
1999	MOM 3	"Walk Don't Run"

== Notes ==
- A "Santa Monica" did not enter the Billboard Hot 100, but peaked at number 29 on the Hot 100 Airplay chart.
- B "Everything to Everyone" did not enter the Billboard Hot 100, but peaked at number 43 on the Hot 100 Airplay chart.
- C "I Will Buy You a New Life" did not enter the Billboard Hot 100, but peaked at number 33 on the Hot 100 Airplay chart.
- D "Father of Mine" originally did not enter the Billboard Hot 100, but peaked at number 46 on the Hot 100 Airplay chart, but the song later charted on the Billboard Hot 100 since the rules have changed after December 1998 bringing the song up to number 70 on that chart.
- E "AM Radio" did not enter the Billboard Hot 100, but peaked at number 1 on the Bubbling Under Hot 100 Singles chart, which acts as a 25-song extension to the Hot 100.
- F "When It All Goes Wrong Again" did not enter the Billboard Hot 100, but peaked at number 21 on the Bubbling Under Hot 100 Singles chart, which acts as a 25-song extension to the Hot 100.
