= The Very Best of Everclear =

Compilation album by Everclear
- Released: May 13, 2014
- Genres: Alternative rock, post-grunge
- Label: Cleopatra

Everclear chronology
Invisible Stars (2012)	The Very Best of Everclear (2014)

The Very Best of Everclear is a 2014 compilation album by the band Everclear. It is the band's third release with label Cleopatra Records. The album consists of a mix of re-recorded Eveclear originals and covers of other bands' hits all of which were contained in previous albums. With an identical track listing, this album is essentially a vinyl version of Return to Santa Monica with a new name and cover art.

The album was released in three versions: green, blue, or clear vinyl.

== Track listing ==
1. "Santa Monica" – 3:14
  - (Originally released on the album Sparkle and Fade.)
2. "Wonderful" – 4:23
  - (Originally released on the album Songs from an American Movie Vol. One: Learning How to Smile.)
3. "Father of Mine" – 3:55
  - (Originally released on the album So Much For The Afterglow.)
4. "I Will Buy You A New Life" – 3:54
  - (Originally released on the album So Much For The Afterglow.)
5. "Everything to Everyone" – 3:21
  - (Originally released on the album So Much For the Afterglow.)
6. "I Won't Back Down" – 3:30
  - (Cover of the song originally released on the Tom Petty solo album Full Moon Fever.)
7. "Unemployed Boyfriend" – 4:06
  - (Originally released on the album Songs from an American Movie Vol. One: Learning How to Smile.)
8. "The Joker" – 4:58
  - (Cover of the Steve Miller Band song originally released on the album The Joker.)
9. "I Will Follow You Into the Dark" – 2:38
  - (Cover of the Death Cab for Cutie song originally released on the album Plans.)
10. "Every Breath You Take" – 3:20
  - (Cover of The Police song originally released on the album Synchronicity.)
11. "AM Radio" – 3:56
  - (Originally released on the album Songs from an American Movie Vol. One: Learning How to Smile.)
12. "Brown Eyed Girl" – 4:11
  - (Originally released on the album Songs from an American Movie Vol. One: Learning How to Smile and a cover of the Van Morrison song from the album Blowin' Your Mind.)

== Personnel ==
- Art Alexakis – lead vocals, guitar
- Dave French – guitar, backing vocals
- Freddy Herrera – bass, backing vocals
- Sean Winchester – drums, percussion, keyboards, backing vocals
