= Ten Years Gone: The Best of Everclear 1994–2004 =

Ten Years Gone: The Best of Everclear 1994-2004

Greatest hits album by Everclear
- Released: October 5, 2004
- Recorded: 1993–2004
- Genre: Alternative rock
- Length: 76:12
- Label: Capitol
- Producer: Art Alexakis

Everclear chronology
Slow Motion Daydream (2003)	Ten Years Gone: The Best of Everclear 1994-2004 (2004)	Welcome to the Drama Club (2006)

Professional ratings
Review scores
Source	Rating
411Mania.com	(4/10)
AllMusic	4.5/5 stars
The A.V. Club	(unfavorable)
Entertainment Weekly	(favorable)
Rolling Stone	4/5 stars

Ten Years Gone: The Best of Everclear 1994–2004 is a 'Best of' album by Everclear. It was released on October 5, 2004. It includes tracks from all of their albums up to 2003, as well as two tracks not previously released on any album. "The New Disease" was previously released on a "Volvo Driving Soccer Mom" CD single, and "Sex With a Movie Star (The Good Witch Gone Bad)" did not appear anywhere else.

The cover art and album title of Ten Years Gone: The Best of Everclear 1994–2004 pays homage to both Led Zeppelin and the Rolling Stones. The album title is a reference to the Led Zeppelin song of the same name while the cover art closely resembles that of Exile On Main St., by the Rolling Stones. The title states the years 1994-2004, likely because 1994 is the year that Capitol Records re-released the band's first album World of Noise; however, it was first released in 1993 on Tim/Kerr Records.

== Track listing ==
All songs written by Art Alexakis, Craig Montoya and Greg Eklund except where noted:

No.	Title	Writer(s)	Albums	Length
1.	"Wonderful"		Vol. One, 2000	5:01
2.	"Santa Monica"		Sparkle and Fade, 1995	3:11
3.	"Everything to Everyone"		So Much for the Afterglow, 1997	3:20
4.	"AM Radio"		Vol. One, 2000	3:56
5.	"Volvo Driving Soccer Mom"		Slow Motion Daydream, 2003	3:15
6.	"I Will Buy You a New Life"		So Much for the Afterglow, 1997	1:30
7.	"Learning How to Smile"		Vol. One, 2000	3:51
8.	"Strawberry"		Sparkle and Fade, 1995	2:33
9.	"Local God"		Romeo + Juliet (soundtrack), 1996	3:54
10.	"Summerland"		Sparkle and Fade, 1995	3:42
11.	"Fire Maple Song"	Alexakis, Scott Cuthbert, Montoya	World of Noise, 1993	4:11
12.	"When It All Goes Wrong Again"		Vol. Two, 2000	3:48
13.	"Father of Mine (Radio Mix)"		So Much for the Afterglow, 1997	3:47
14.	"The Boys Are Back in Town (Thin Lizzy cover)"	Phil Lynott	Detroit Rock City soundtrack	4:12
15.	"Heroin Girl"	Alexakis, Cuthbert, Montoya	Sparkle and Fade, 1995	2:25
16.	"Brown Eyed Girl (Van Morrison cover)"	Van Morrison	Vol. One, 2000	4:20
17.	"Sex with a Movie Star (The Good Witch Gone Bad)"			4:00
18.	"The New Disease"		"Volvo Driving Soccer Mom" single	3:47
19.	"The New York Times"		Slow Motion Daydream, 2003	4:13
20.	"Song from an American Movie, Pt. 1"		Vol. One, 2000	1:38
21.	"Rock Star"		Vol. Two, 2000	3:29

== Charts ==
Chart (2004)	Peak position
US Billboard 200	182
