= In a Different Light (Everclear album) =

Studio album by Everclear
- Released: October 6, 2009
- Recorded: 2008–2009
- Genre: Alternative rock, post-grunge
- Length: 45:25
- Label: 429
- Producer: Art Alexakis

Everclear chronology
The Vegas Years (2008)	In a Different Light (2009)	Return to Santa Monica (2011)

Professional ratings
Review scores
Source	Rating
AllMusic	2.5/5 stars
Chartattack	4/5 stars

In a Different Light is a 2009 album by the band Everclear. It is the band's first album with label 429 Records. The album features re-recordings of songs from the band's previous albums, performed in a more stripped down and acoustic fashion, as well as two previously unreleased songs, "At the End of the Day" and "Here Comes the Darkness".

In a Different Light was released in the United States on October 6, 2009.

== Track listing ==
1. "Everything to Everyone" – 3:18
  - (Originally released on the album So Much for the Afterglow.)
2. "Wonderful" – 4:21
  - (Originally released on the album Songs from an American Movie Vol. One: Learning How to Smile.)
3. "At the End of the Day" – 4:40
  - (First release, written and performed by Alexakis with Marion Raven, originally released on Raven's album "Here I Am")
4. "Santa Monica" – 3:54
  - (Originally released on the album Sparkle and Fade.)
5. "Summerland" – 4:07
  - (Originally released on the album Sparkle and Fade.)
6. "Here Comes the Darkness" – 4:52
  - (First release, leftover track from Welcome to the Drama Club.)
7. "Father of Mine" – 3:51
  - (Originally released on the album So Much for the Afterglow.)
8. "Fire Maple Song" – 4:15
  - (Originally released on the album World of Noise.)
9. "Rock Star" – 3:19
  - (Originally released on the album Songs from an American Movie Vol. Two: Good Time for a Bad Attitude.)
10. "Learning How to Smile" – 4:08
  - (Originally released on the album Songs from an American Movie Vol. One: Learning How to Smile.)
11. "I Will Buy You a New Life" – 4:35
  - (Originally released on the album So Much for the Afterglow.)

Bonus tracks

12. Amazon.com: "Blondes" (acoustic version from Closure EP)
12. iTunes: "The Swing" (acoustic version from Closure EP)

== Personnel ==
- Art AlexakisJosh Crawley – keyboards, backing vocals
- Tommy Stewart – drums, percussion
