= Return to Santa Monica =

Studio album by Everclear
- Released: September 27, 2011
- Genres: Alternative rock, grunge, hard rock
- Length: 45:02
- Label: Cleopatra

Everclear chronology
In a Different Light (2009)	Return to Santa Monica (2011)	Greatest Hits (2011)

Return to Santa Monica is a 2011 album by the band Everclear. It is the band's first album with label Cleopatra Records. The album consists of a mix of re-recorded Everclear originals and covers of other bands' hits.

The A.V. Club deemed the release to be the "least essential album of 2011".

== Greatest Hits ==
A variation of the album titled Greatest Hits was released December 27, 2011 in digital formats only. It omits two of the covers from Return to Santa Monica, The Police's "Every Breath You Take" and the Steve Miller Band's "The Joker".

== Track listing ==
1. "Santa Monica" – 3:14
  - (Originally released on the album Sparkle and Fade.)
2. "Wonderful" – 4:23
  - (Originally released on the album Songs from an American Movie Vol. One: Learning How to Smile.)
3. "Father of Mine" – 3:55
  - (Originally released on the album So Much For The Afterglow.)
4. "I Will Buy You A New Life" – 3:54
  - (Originally released on the album So Much For The Afterglow.)
5. "Everything to Everyone" – 3:21
  - (Originally released on the album So Much For the Afterglow.)
6. "I Won't Back Down" – 3:06
  - (Cover of the song originally released on the Tom Petty solo album Full Moon Fever.)
7. "Unemployed Boyfriend" – 4:06
  - (Originally released on the album Songs from an American Movie Vol. One: Learning How to Smile.)
8. "The Joker" – 4:58
  - (Cover of the Steve Miller Band song originally released on the album The Joker.)
9. "I Will Follow You Into the Dark" – 2:38
  - (Cover of the Death Cab for Cutie song originally released on the album Plans.)
10. "Every Breath You Take" – 3:20
  - (Cover of The Police song originally released on the album Synchronicity.)
11. "AM Radio" – 3:56
  - (Originally released on the album Songs from an American Movie Vol. One: Learning How to Smile.)
12. "Brown Eyed Girl" – 4:11
  - (Originally released on the album Songs from an American Movie Vol. One: Learning How to Smile and a cover of the Van Morrison song from the album Blowin' Your Mind.)

== Personnel ==
- Art Alexakis – lead vocals, guitar
- Dave French – guitar, backing vocals
- Freddy Herrera – bass, backing vocals
- Sean Winchester – drums, percussion, keyboards, backing vocals
