= The Best of Everclear =

Greatest hits album by Everclear
- Released: October 17, 2006
- Recorded: 1995–2000
- Genre: Alternative rock, post-grunge
- Length: 38:21
- Label: Capitol

Everclear chronology
Welcome to the Drama Club (2006)	The Best of Everclear (2006)	The Vegas Years (2008)

The Best of Everclear is a greatest hits album by American alternative rock band Everclear. It was released on October 17, 2006 by Capitol Records. Notable exclusions from the album include "I Will Buy You a New Life" and "Father of Mine."

== Track listing ==
1. "Santa Monica" – 3:13
2. "Everything to Everyone" – 3:21
3. "Heartspark Dollarsign" – 2:53
4. "Brown Eyed Girl" – 4:22
5. "Sunflowers" – 3:49
6. "When It All Goes Wrong Again" – 3:49
7. "So Much for the Afterglow" – 3:55
8. "One Hit Wonder" – 3:30
9. "Out of My Depth" – 4:34
10. "Annabella's Song" – 4:55

== Song origins ==
- Tracks 1 and 3 originally appeared on Sparkle and Fade (1995)
- Tracks 2, 5, 7, and 8 originally appeared on So Much for the Afterglow (1997)
- Tracks 4 and 10 originally appeared on Songs from an American Movie Vol. One: Learning How to Smile (2000)
- Tracks 6 and 9 originally appeared on Songs from an American Movie Vol. Two: Good Time for a Bad Attitude (2000)
