= Loser (2000 film) =

2000 film by Amy Heckerling

- Theatrical release poster
- Directed by: Amy Heckerling
- Written by: Amy Heckerling
- Produced by: Amy Heckerling; Twink Caplan
- Starring: Jason Biggs; Mena Suvari; Greg Kinnear
- Cinematography: Rob Hahn
- Edited by: Debra Chiate
- Music by: David Kitay
- Production companies: Columbia Pictures; Branti Film Productions; Cockamamie
- Distributed by: Sony Pictures Releasing
- Release date: July 21, 2000
- Running time: 95 minutes
- Country: United States
- Language: English
- Budget: $20 million
- Box office: $18.4 million

Loser is a 2000 American teen romantic comedy film written and directed by Amy Heckerling. Starring Jason Biggs, Mena Suvari and Greg Kinnear, it is about a fish-out-of-water college student (Biggs) who falls for a classmate (Suvari), unaware she is in a relationship with their English teacher (Kinnear). The film, Heckerling's first after 1995's Clueless and inspired by the 1960 film The Apartment, was a box-office failure and received negative reviews.

== Plot ==
Paul Tannek, a small-town, intelligent kid from the Midwest, is accepted into New York University on scholarship. Following his father's advice, he tries to gain friends by being polite and interested in others. However, his new roommates—Chris, Adam, and Noah—brand him a loser due to his polite manner, working-class background, and determination to educate himself. The trio concocts a false story for the housing administration about Paul's attitude. As a result, he is thrown out of the dorm and forced to live in a veterinary hospital. Later, after being banned from throwing parties in the dorm, the trio convinces Paul to let them party at the hospital.

Paul is attracted to classmate Dora Diamond, unaware of her affair with English professor Edward Alcott. Dora had been working as a waitress in a strip club to pay tuition before she was fired. Dora asks Alcott if she can temporarily live with him to save on commuting time. Alcott declines her request.

Paul invites Dora to a concert of Everclear, of whom she was a fan. On the night of the date, Adam invites Dora to a party at the veterinary hospital where Paul works. She accepts, intending to leave early. However, at the party, she is roofied by two different people and passes out. After the concert, Paul returns to the hospital to find a huge mess and an unresponsive Dora.

Rushing her to the hospital, Paul learns Alcott is Dora's emergency contact, and he tells Chris the following day without thinking. Alcott denies knowing Dora when contacted by emergency officials. As she recovers, Dora and Paul start to develop feelings for each other, though he notices that Dora is still infatuated with Alcott.

Dora finds a new job and celebrates with Paul, but their celebration is cut short by Alcott, who has changed his mind about Dora living with him. Alcott reveals that Chris, Noah, and Adam are blackmailing him for passing grades, and he suspects Paul is involved in the scheme. After discovering roofies were used at the party, Paul steals Noah's supply and replaces them with placebos. This ruins the trios party and they soon realized that Paul switched the drugs. Adam confronted Paul about it and upon insulting Dora, Paul and Adam fought. Paul visits Alcott's office to inquire about Dora and is given his final exam as a take-home test. Paul turns down the offer, jeopardizing his scholarship.

Dora overhears Paul on the phone with his father, talking about how much he misses her. Alcott then admits he learned that Paul had nothing to do with the blackmail, but still intends to fail him. Realizing Paul is the one who truly loves her, Dora ends her affair with Alcott and begins a relationship with Paul, who has dropped Alcott's course and will take extra credit to maintain his average. Afterward, Adam, Noah, and Chris' behavior gets the better of them, and their lives plummet into failure. At the same time, Alcott is found out and sent to prison for having an affair with an underage student, and Paul and Dora remain happy in their relationship.

== Cast ==
- Jason Biggs as Paul Tannek
- Mena Suvari as Dora Diamond
- Greg Kinnear as Professor Edward Alcott, teacher
- Zak Orth as Adam
- Tom Sadoski as Chris
- Jimmi Simpson as Noah
- Bobby Slayton as Sal
- Dan Aykroyd as Mr. Tannek
- Twink Caplan as Gena
- Andrea Martin as Professor
- Robert Miano as Victor
- Meredith Scott Lynn as Dog-loving girl
- Stuart Cornfeld as Foreman
- Taylor Negron as Photographer
- Catherine Black as Military jacket girl
- Steven Wright as Bar dude
- Andy Dick as Office clerk
- Colleen Camp as Homeless woman
- David Spade as Video store clerk
- Brian Backer as Doctor
- Alan Cumming as Himself/Emcee (in Cabaret)
- Everclear (Art Alexakis, Greg Eklund, and Craig Montoya) as themselves

== Music ==
The music was composed by David Kitay. No official soundtrack was ever released. These are the songs contained in the film:

=== Loser soundtrack ===
==== Track listing ====
| No. | Title | Writer(s) | Performed by | Length |
|---|---|---|---|---|
| 1. | "Don't Fight It Baby" | Biff Stannard, Julian Gallagher, Jason Brown, Sean Conlon, Richard Breen | Five | 3:05 |
| 2. | "Teenage Dirtbag" | Brendan B. Brown | Wheatus | 4:07 |
| 3. | "Pretty Fly (For a White Guy)" | Dexter Holland, Steve Clark, Joe Elliott, Robert John "Mutt" Lange | The Offspring | 3:07 |
| 4. | "Blue (Da Ba Dee)" | Jeffrey Jey, Maurizio Lobina, Massimo Gabutti | Eiffel 65 | 3:39 |
| 5. | "Out of My Head" | Tony Scalzo | Fastball | 2:32 |
| 6. | "What's My Age Again?" | Mark Hoppus, Tom DeLonge | Blink-182 | 2:26 |
| 7. | "Magna Cum Nada" | Jimmy Pop, Richard Gavalis | Bloodhound Gang | 4:00 |
| 8. | "Right Now" | Mitch Allan, Butch Walker | SR-71 | 2:47 |
| 9. | "I Will Buy You a New Life" | Art Alexakis, Greg Eklund, Craig Montoya | Everclear | 3:58 |
| 10. | "Aurora" | Dave Grohl, Nate Mendel, Taylor Hawkins | Foo Fighters | 5:50 |
| 11. | "Mint Car" | Roger O'Donnell, Perry Bamonte, Simon Gallup, Robert Smith, Jason Cooper | The Cure | 3:29 |
| 12. | "The Bad Touch" | Jimmy Pop | Bloodhound Gang | 4:20 |
| 13. | "She's So High" | Tal Bachman | Tal Bachman | 3:44 |
| 14. | "So Much for the Afterglow" (The song was used for the concert event in the movie.) | Art Alexakis, Greg Eklund, Craig Montoya | Everclear | 3:53 |
| Total length: | | | | 50:47 |

Michael Penn's song "No Myth", featured prominently in the final scene and during the credits, was not included in the soundtrack.

== Release ==
=== Theatrical ===
Loser was theatrically released in North America alongside What Lies Beneath and Pokémon the Movie 2000 on July 21, 2000.

== Reception ==
=== Box office ===
The film opened in 8th place on the North American box office, earning $6.0 million in its opening weekend and generating a total of $15.6 million in the US. It fared no better when released worldwide, grossing a total of $2.7 million. The film did not break even on its production costs.

In a 2017 interview with The Ringer, director Amy Heckerling said the reason for the film's failure was the studio's insistence on a "watered down" PG-13 rating, even though Heckerling and the studio executives who greenlit the film intended for the movie to be an R-rated comedy.

=== Critical response ===
On Rotten Tomatoes, the film has a score of 24% based on reviews from 96 critics, with an average rating of 4.2/10. The site's consensus states: "In the grand tradition of teen flicks, Loser comes across as another predictable and underwritten movie with nothing new to offer." On Metacritic, it has a 35% score based on reviews from 29 critics, indicating "generally unfavorable" reviews. Audiences polled by CinemaScore gave the film an average grade of "C+" on an A+ to F scale.

Roger Ebert gives the film two stars out of four. He enjoyed the performance of Kinnear as well as the chemistry between the two leads, but found the film otherwise unremarkable.

Film critic James Berardinelli gave the film 3 out 4 stars, stating that the film was one of the "pleasant surprises" of the 2000 film season.
