= White Trash Hell =

EP by Everclear
- Released: March 24, 1997
- Recorded: 1994
- Genre: Grunge
- Length: 20:46
- Label: Fire Records

Everclear chronology
Sparkle and Fade (1995)	White Trash Hell (1997)	So Much for the Afterglow (1997)

White Trash Hell is an EP by Everclear, released on March 24, 1997. The disc is largely a collection of demos recorded with drummer Scott Cuthbert in 1994 in preparation for Sparkle and Fade, with the exception of the acoustic version of "Fire Maple Song", which features Greg Eklund on drums. The band turned over the recordings to their UK label, Fire Records, expecting them to be released sometime in 1995. However, the label stalled on releasing the EP, and it remained unissued until 1997.

The disc was available exclusively as a UK import until 2000, when it was issued in the US by label Atomic Pop. However, Atomic Pop went bankrupt within a few months, pushing its version out of print. Fire eventually re-issued the disc (without the band's involvement or permission) in 2002 with a slipcover and slightly modified artwork.

The original artwork was designed by Steve Birch, who Art Alexakis met during the Colorfinger days while Steve was in Portland band Sprinkler. Birch later became a touring guitarist for Everclear during the tours in support of So Much for the Afterglow.

In 2022, a deluxe 30th anniversary edition of the band's 1993 debut album World of Noise was released and it featured four of the tracks from the White Trash Hell EP.

== Track listing ==
1. "Heroin Girl (Early Version)" - 2:28
2. "Pacific Wonderland" - 1:56
3. "Blondes" - 2:16
4. "Detroit" - 3:23
5. "1975" - 3:18
6. "For Pete's Sake" - 3:11
7. "Fire Maple Song (Acoustic)" - 4:14

== Personnel ==
- Art Alexakis – guitar, vocals
- Craig Montoya – bass
- Scott Cuthbert – drums (Tracks 1–6)
- Greg Eklund – drums (Track 7)
