= Nervous & Weird =

EP by Everclear
- Released: 12 October 1993
- Recorded: May 1993
- Genre: Punk rock
- Length: 15:28
- Label: Tim/Kerr
- Producer: Art Alexakis

Everclear chronology
Nervous & Weird (1993)	World of Noise (1993)

Nervous & Weird is an EP by American rock band Everclear, released in 1993. It was the first official release by the band. In addition to the CD, there was also a 7" release, which featured the title track on side A and "Electra Made Me Blind" on side B.

== Song information ==
"Nervous and Weird" later appeared on their first album, World of Noise. "Connection" is a Rolling Stones cover. "Slow Motion Genius" has musical similarities to "Your Genius Hands," also on World of Noise. "Electra Made Me Blind" was later re-recorded for Sparkle and Fade.

== Track listing ==
All songs by Art Alexakis and Everclear except where noted.

1. "Nervous and Weird" – 2:32
2. "Lame" – 2:07
3. "Drunk Again" – 3:03
4. "Connection" (Mick Jagger/Keith Richards) – 2:14
5. "Electra Made Me Blind" – 4:06
6. "Slow Motion Genius" – 1:26

== Members ==
- Art Alexakis – Guitar, Vocals
- Craig Montoya – Bass
- Scott Cuthbert – drums
