= Volvo Driving Soccer Mom =

Single by Everclear

from the album Slow Motion Daydream
- Released: January 14, 2003
- Genre: Alternative rock, pop rock, grunge
- Length: 3:13
- Songwriter(s): Art Alexakis, Greg Eklund, Craig Montoya
- Producer(s): Art Alexakis, Lars Fox

Everclear singles chronology
"Out of My Depth" (2001)	"Volvo Driving Soccer Mom" (2003)	"The New York Times" (2003)

Music video
- "Volvo Driving Soccer Mom" on YouTube

"Volvo-Driving Soccer Mom" is a song by the alternative rock band Everclear, from their album Slow Motion Daydream (2003). The song was performed by Everclear lead singer Art Alexakis during his solo tour and was made the first single off Slow Motion Daydream.

== Content ==
The song is about girls who use drugs and are sexually promiscuous in high school and college, but later grow up to be more conservative, suburban housewives when they decide it will be to their advantage. The lyrics allude to having a threesome and being busted for possession in the earlier part of the song, and describes the subjects' lives later on as "blonde, bland, middle-class Republican lives".

In an October 2003 interview with Songfacts, Alexakis explained the inspiration for "Volvo Driving Soccer Mom":

This is a song about definitions, about being defined by people, allowing yourself to be defined by other people's standards. It's very junior-high to be able to say 'that person's this, that person's a slut, that person's that.' It's understandable in junior high school, it's just unacceptable in your 20s, 30s, and 40s. People doing it is not right, so it's kind of poking fun at them and people who allow it to happen to them. Who cares if you're a porn star? Who cares if you're a stripper. Who cares if you have a bunch of tattoos? What matters is, are you a good person? Do you pay your taxes? Are you good to your kids? Are you a good neighbor? Nothing else should matter to anybody else. What people do in their own life, if it doesn't hurt other people, should not matter.

== Music video ==
The video for the song features the story of a blonde wild child and former stripper who grows up to become a Volvo-driving soccer mom just like the song describes. In the video, scenes from her "checkered" past are intercut with scenes from her present life as a housewife to highlight the differences between the two. Some of the final scenes subvert the implied message of the song, portraying the present day housewife engaged in sex while her past stripper self falls asleep alone watching financial reports. The video also features scenes of Everclear performing the song at a house party.

== Australian CD single ==
1. "Volvo Driving Soccer Mom"
2. "The New Disease"
3. "Happy"

== Charts ==
Chart (2003)	Peak position
US Alternative Airplay (Billboard)	30

== See also ==
- Volvo
- Soccer mom
