= Live from Toronto =

Live from Toronto may refer to:

- Live from Toronto (Everclear album)
- Live from Toronto (The Who album)
