= The Drama King =

The Drama King may refer to:

- The Drama King, a nickname of DJ Kay Slay
- The Drama King, a nickname of Matthew Rehwoldt
- "The Drama King", a song by Everclear from the 2006 album Welcome to the Drama Club

== See also ==
- The King of Dramas, a 2012 TV series
