= Sun Songs =

Studio album by Art Alexakis
- Released: October 11, 2019
- Recorded: April 2018 – April 2019
- Studio: Sugarnoise Studio, Pasadena, California, United States
- Genre: Alternative rock
- Length: 37:03
- Language: English
- Label: BMG Rights Management/The End
- Producer: Art Alexakis; Stuart Schenk

Sun Songs is the 2019 debut solo album by American alternative rock musician Art Alexakis, best known for fronting Everclear. The album was released by The End Records/BMG and received positive feedback from critics.

== Recording and release ==
I wanted to make this record because I wanted to do something fun, challenging, and something I’ve never done before. I’ve always thought that making a solo record would be cool if I did it all by myself, and though I did need help with the engineering and production, I wrote all of the songs, played all of the instruments, and sang all of the vocals.

—Alexakis on recording Sun Songs

Sun Songs was announced on early 2019 with a short promotional tour of the United States and British Isles. The announcement coincided with Alexakis' revelation that he had been battling multiple sclerosis for three years, including the recording period for the album. The process of recording and the lyrical content are introspective of Alexakis' health and reflections on his family life, centering the songwriting on his vocals and acoustic guitar. Although he had never recorded solo material before, the songwriting that Alexakis did as part of his regular routine resulted in songs that he didn't want to use for Everclear and he entered the studio with a more spontaneous approach to recording.

== Critical reception ==
The editorial staff of AllMusic Guide gave Sun Songs four out of five stars, with reviewer Stephen Thomas Erlewine writing that Alexakis draws on his previous musical strength with Everclear but goes in a different direction that is more "bittersweet" without being "reflexively nostalgic" and that the artist "seems intent on not recycling his old ideas".

== Track listing ==
All songs written by Art Alexakis

1. "Sunshine Love Song" – 1:50
2. "California Blood" – 3:18
3. "A House with a Pool" – 4:01
4. "Orange" – 3:33
5. "The Hot Water Test" – 4:11
6. "Arizona Star" – 2:58
7. "Look at Us Now" – 2:12
8. "White People Scare Me" – 3:00
9. "Sing Away" – 4:10
10. "Line in the Sand" – 4:21
11. "A Seat at the Table" – 3:29

== Personnel ==
- Art Alexakis – guitar, bass guitar, vocals, drums, production
- Sean Carr – studio technician
- Andre Duman – back cover, photography
- Andreas Katsambas – executive production
- Stuart Schenk – engineering, mixing, production
- Adam Turner – photography
