= The Vegas Years =

Compilation album by Everclear
- Released: April 15, 2008
- Recorded: 1994–2007
- Genre: Alternative rock, post-grunge
- Length: 45:37
- Label: Capitol
- Producer: Art Alexakis

Everclear chronology
The Best of Everclear (2006)	The Vegas Years (2008)	In a Different Light (2009)

The Vegas Years is a compilation of cover songs by American rock band Everclear. It was released on April 15, 2008, via Capitol Records.

The album features tracks recorded throughout the band's career, including a few tracks that were previously released as B-sides. "American Girl" was recorded in 1994 and originally appeared on You Got Lucky: A Tribute to Tom Petty. "Southern Girls" and "Speed Racer" were recorded in 1996, and were released on the Japanese release of So Much for the Afterglow and later on the "Wonderful" UK single. "Our Lips Are Sealed", "Bad Connection", and "Pocahontas" were recorded in 1997 and appeared on various singles in support of So Much for the Afterglow. "The Boys Are Back in Town" was recorded for the soundtrack to the 1999 film Detroit Rock City. "Night Train to Memphis" appeared as a bonus track on the Japanese release of Songs from an American Movie Vol. One: Learning How to Smile. "This Land Is Your Land" was recorded in 2004, and appeared on the Wake Up Everybody compilation.

Several of the tracks are new for this release, including "Rich Girl", "Kicks", and "Land of the Lost". While "Our Lips Are Sealed" and "Southern Girls" were previously released, the versions included on The Vegas Years are newly remixed, featuring new guitar and keyboard parts supplied by current Everclear members Davey French and Josh Crawley. "This Land Is Your Land" also features new elements dubbed over the original mix of the song, as the band lost the original multitracks. The album also features two live performances: "Brown Eyed Girl", which the band recorded in studio form for Learning How to Smile, and "867-5309/Jenny", which became a regular show-closer for the band in 2004.

== Track listing ==
1. "Rich Girl" (2:26) (Hall)
  Originally by Hall & Oates
2. "Our Lips Are Sealed" (2:45) (Wiedlin / Hall)
  Originally by The Go-Go's and Fun Boy Three
3. "The Boys Are Back in Town" (4:41) (Lynott)
  Originally by Thin Lizzy
4. "Bad Connection" (3:40) (Clarke)
  Originally by Yazoo
5. "Kicks" (2:41) (Mann / Weil)
  Originally by Paul Revere & the Raiders
6. "Pocahontas" (3:18) (Young)
  Originally by Neil Young
7. "Night Train to Memphis" (2:05) (Smith / Hughes / Bradley)
  Originally by Roy Acuff
8. "This Land Is Your Land" (3:07) (Guthrie)
9. "American Girl" (3:29) (Petty)
  Originally by Tom Petty and the Heartbreakers
10. "Brown Eyed Girl" [Live] (4:04) (Morrison)
  Originally by Van Morrison
11. "Southern Girls" (2:51) (Nielsen / Petersson)
  Originally by Cheap Trick
12. "Land of the Lost" (3:40)
13. "Speed Racer" (2:24)
14. "Live Intro" (0:38)
15. "867-5309 (Jenny)" [Live] (3:46) (Call / Keller)
  Originally by Tommy Tutone
