= Jolly Mon =

American rock band

- Origin: Eugene, Oregon, United States
- Genres: Rock, Alternative Rock Hard Rock Alternative Metal Funk Metal Post-Grunge
- Years active: 1991–present
- Labels: Elemental, Battle Arena, Jollymon
- Members: Mark Blackburn; John Colgate; Carey Rich
- Past members: Greg Eklund; Karl Becker; Malcolm Brown; Brian Smith; Kevin Hutton; Tom Nicklson; Aaron Hyde; Brian Powell; Joe Gramm; Brian Brookins; Angelo Jons (banjo); Branden

Jolly Mon, also stylized as Jollymon, is an American rock band currently based in Portland, Oregon, but has been described as a mixture of reggae, 70s atmospheric Pink Floyd, and hard rock.

== History ==
The founding member Carey Rich moved from the East coast in 1991 to Eugene, Oregon. After originally deciding upon Seattle, Washington, Rich switched to Eugene because it wasn't as intimidating at first sight. By August, Rich answered a bulletin board ad for a band looking for a bass player. The ad listed influences of Jimi Hendrix, Red Hot Chili Peppers, Primus, Black Sabbath and others. Rich mentioned the group "clicked" and began practicing a lot and by October had played their first show. By August 1992, because they had previously opened for bands like the Cherry Poppin' Daddies, Hitting Birth, and Sweaty Nipples the band was rewarded with the opportunity to headline the largest venue in town the WOW Hall. In 1993, the band signed to Elemental Records for a one-album contract and began headlining bigger clubs in Portland, Oregon, like La Luna, and RCKNDY and The Off Ramp in Seattle. At this time the band was courted by Maverick Records but the opening band Candlebox outmaneuvered Jolly Mon and got a contract instead.

Originally, Rich played bass guitar and performed vocals, with Karl Becker on guitar and Greg Eklund on drums. The band moved to Portland, Oregon in 1994 and around the time of their debut album Sailing, Becker quit the band and was replaced by Brian Smith, formerly of Anzio Bridgehead. Becker admitted his tastes switched from thrash metal to jazz and his favorite song on Sailing was "So Big" which he describes as the "most improvised song" from that album.

In 1995, the band released their second album Nobody Knows Who You Are as part of an additional one-album contract with Elemental. Members of the band changed to Smith on guitar and Mark Blackburn replacing Eklund on drums, who had joined the band Everclear. The album was described as psychedelic with a mix of "primal edge". The album was shorter in length than the previous album and contained only seven songs, two less than their previous offering. By this time the band was known for wearing gas masks with foam antennae.

In 1997, it was reported the band was working on another album due out later that year, dubbed the "Chrome album". The band had also undergone some lineup changes. Rich switched to guitar, with Kevin on bass, Branden on drums, and Angelo on turntables. When the album was released on their own label, it had undergone a name change to Stoned Nation Radio. It was described as their trademark sound of fusing "metal thump and hallucinogenic pulse" with "hip hop scratching, coldwave backbeats and throbbing electronica".

By 2002, after struggling to break into the mainstream and being broke, the band unceremoniously dissolved. Rich was involved in various low-key music projects afterward, but settled with having a stable job, marriage, and got into video games like World of Warcraft. Then in 2016, John Colgate contacted Rich to see if he was interested in a one-off Jolly Mon show for nostalgia's sake. After some consideration of his lack of vocal practice the past decade, Rich agreed and they contacted Blackburn who recorded with them on their second album. They began practicing and played their first show in Vancouver, Washington. Word got out on the internet of their reunion and were offered shows from local venues. The band decided to "go for it" and recorded their fifth album.

In 2017, Jolly Mon released their Voidwalker album and was reviewed by the UK magazine Power Play. The album continues the band's exploration into psychedelic territory with a "funky vibe", with some keyboard sounds to round it out. The magazine pontificates on the choice of the band and album names by drawing a comparison with Game of Thrones.

== Discography ==
=== Studio albums ===
- Sailing (1993)
- Nobody Knows Who You Are (1995)
- Stoned Nation Radio (1998)
- Jollymon (2000)
- Voidwalker (2017)

== See also ==
- Floater
