= Invisible Stars =

Studio album by Everclear
- Released: June 26, 2012
- Recorded: 2011–2012
- Studio: Sound City Studios, Village Recorders
- Genre: Alternative rock
- Length: 38:22
- Label: eOne Music
- Producer: Art Alexakis and Stuart Schenk

Everclear chronology
Greatest Hits (2011)	Invisible Stars (2012)	Black Is the New Black (2015)

Singles from Invisible Stars
- 1. "Be Careful What You Ask For" Released: May 15, 2012

Professional ratings
Aggregate scores
Source	Rating
Metacritic	67/100
Review scores
Source	Rating
AllMusic	3.5/5 stars
Alternative Press	3.5/5 stars
Rolling Stone	2.5/5 stars
Under the Gun Review	6/10

Invisible Stars is the eighth studio album of original material by alternative rock band Everclear. The album was released June 26, 2012 through eOne Music, and marked their first release of original material in six years, following 2006's Welcome to the Drama Club. The album's only single, "Be Careful What You Ask For", was released on May 15, 2012, with an accompanying music video in the following month. The album debuted at number 119 on the Billboard 200.

== Track listing ==
All lyrics are written by Art Alexakis; all music is composed by Art Alexakis except where noted.

No.	Title	Length
1.	"Tiger in a Burning Tree"	1:49
2.	"Falling in a Good Way"	2:08
3.	"Be Careful What You Ask For"	3:21
4.	"Volcano"	3:26
5.	"Santa Ana Wind" (Alexakis, David Walsh)	4:19
6.	"Wishing" (Alexakis, Chloe Lowery)	3:54
7.	"I Am Better Without You"	3:53
8.	"Aces"	2:00
9.	"Jackie Robinson"	3:54
10.	"The Golden Rule"	2:17
11.	"Rocket for the Girl"	3:07
12.	"Promenade"	4:09
Total length:		38:22

== Personnel ==
- Art Alexakis – lead vocals, rhythm guitar, keyboards
- Dave French – lead guitar, backing vocals
- Freddy Herrera – bass, backing vocals
- Sean Winchester – drums, percussion, keyboards, backing vocals
- Josh Crawley – keyboards
- Sasha Smith – keyboards
- Nathaniel Kunkel, Stuart Schenk, Erik Reichers, Mark McCluskey – recording engineers
- Marc McClusky, Bob Horn – mixing
- Brad Blackwood – mastering
- Tiana Godfrey, Rob Simmons – photography
- Paul Grosso – art direction and design

== Charts ==
Chart performance for Invisible Stars
Chart (2012)	Peak position
New Zealand Albums (RMNZ)	5
US Billboard 200	119
US Independent Albums (Billboard)	21
