= Live from Toronto (EP) =

Live From Toronto

EP by Everclear
- Released: August 8, 1998
- Recorded: January 17, 1998
- Genre: Post-grunge
- Length: 27:59
- Label: Capitol

Live From Toronto is an EP by the Portland, Oregon, band Everclear. It was released only in Japan. Recorded January 14, 1998, in Toronto, the entire set list was 12 songs long. Tracks 2, 4, 5, 6, and 8 were featured on a promo CD with certain editions of their 2000 release Songs from an American Movie Vol. One: Learning How to Smile.

== Track listing ==
1. "Everything to Everyone" - 3:20
2. "Amphetamine" - 3:54
3. "I Will Buy You a New Life" - 4:43
4. "Loser Makes Good" - 3:02
5. "Heroin Girl" - 3:05
6. "Normal Like You" - 3:10
7. "Santa Monica" - 3:20
8. "Local God" - 4:05
