= Slow Motion Daydream =

Studio album by Everclear
- Released: March 11, 2003
- Recorded: 2002
- Genre: Alternative rock, power pop
- Length: 45:31
- Label: Capitol
- Producer: Art Alexakis, Lars Fox

Everclear chronology
Songs from an American Movie Vol. Two: Good Time for a Bad Attitude (2000)	Slow Motion Daydream (2003)	Ten Years Gone: The Best of Everclear 1994-2004 (2004)

Singles from Slow Motion Daydream
- 1. "Volvo Driving Soccer Mom" Released: January 14, 2003; 2. "The New York Times" Released: April 7, 2003

Professional ratings
Aggregate scores
Source	Rating
Metacritic	57/100
Review scores
Source	Rating
AllMusic	3/5 stars
Blender	2.5/5 stars
E!	C−
Entertainment Weekly	D+
Filter	37%
The Independent	4/5 stars
Q	2.5/5 stars
Rolling Stone	3/5 stars
Spin	B
Stylus	2.2/10

Slow Motion Daydream is the sixth studio album by Everclear. It was released in the U.S. in 2003 on Capitol Records and recorded in 2002.

== Production ==
The first single released to radio from Slow Motion Daydream was "Volvo Driving Soccer Mom", followed by second single "The New York Times".

Though the album debuted at number 33 on the Billboard 200 chart, higher than the band's last, it quickly fell off the charts. By July 2004, the album had sold 106,000 copies in the United States, according to Nielsen Soundscan. Spin listed the album as one of 2003's biggest commercial flops.

This was the last album of new material to feature longtime members Craig Montoya and Greg Eklund who left the band later in August of that year.

== Track listing ==
All tracks are written by Art Alexakis and Everclear.

No.	Title	Length
1.	"How to Win Friends and Influence People"	3:33
2.	"Blackjack"	2:51
3.	"I Want to Die a Beautiful Death"	3:30
4.	"Volvo Driving Soccer Mom"	3:13
5.	"Science Fiction"	2:43
6.	"New Blue Champion"	3:51
7.	"TV Show"	4:10
8.	"Chrysanthemum"	1:38
9.	"Sunshine (That Acid Summer)"	4:28
10.	"A Beautiful Life"	4:47
11.	"The New York Times"	4:17
12.	"White Noise" (hidden track)	3:58

== Personnel ==
- Art Alexakis – guitar, vocals
- Craig Montoya – bass
- Greg Eklund – drums

== Charts ==
Chart performance for Slow Motion Daydream
Chart (2003)	Peak position
Australian Albums (ARIA)	85
Canadian Albums (Jam!)	43
US Billboard 200	33
