= AM Radio (song) =

2000 single by Everclear

Single by Everclear

from the album Songs from an American Movie Vol. One: Learning How to Smile
- B-side: "Southern Girls"; "I'm on Your Time"
- Released: August 22, 2000
- Length: 3:50
- Label: Capitol
- Songwriters: Art Alexakis; Joe Broussard; Greg Eklund; Craig Montoya; Carroll Washington; Ralph G. Williams
- Producers: Art Alexakis; Lars Fox; Neal Avron

Everclear singles chronology
"Wonderful" (2000)	"AM Radio" (2000)	"When It All Goes Wrong Again" (2001)

Music video
- "AM Radio" on YouTube

"AM Radio" is a song by American rock band Everclear from their fourth album, Songs from an American Movie Vol. One: Learning How to Smile (2000). The song was released as the second single from the album on August 22, 2000, and reached number one on the US Billboard Bubbling Under Hot 100 Singles chart. In New Zealand, it entered the top 40, peaking at number 32 on the RIANZ Singles Chart.

== Content ==
The song "AM Radio"'s lyrics deal with Art Alexakis' memories of growing up during the 1970s—specifically mentioning the years 1970, 1972, 1975, and 1977—while listening to his favorite music on AM radio, which Alexakis describes in the outro chant as: "We like pop, we like soul, we like rock, but we never liked disco."

The song begins with a 1970s vintage jingle from Los Angeles radio station KHJ and samples Jean Knight's song "Mr. Big Stuff". It also contains a short sample of "Those Were the Days", the theme song of the American sitcom All in the Family. However, certain versions of the song, including the version on later pressings of Songs from an American Movie Vol. One: Learning How to Smile omit the sample.

The lyrics make reference to several items of 1970s nostalgia: the Ford Pinto, 8-track tapes, the classic television shows Good Times and Chico and the Man, and the band Led Zeppelin (in 1977, the song's characters would have been listening to the album Presence).

The song was used as a tribute to AM Radio Top 40 by John Records Landecker to open his Memorial Day show on the 2008 WLS (AM) "Big 89 Rewind". WLS in Chicago was one of the leading AM giants in Top 40 radio from the 1960s to August 23, 1989, when it dropped music for all talk.

== Music video ==
Directed by Alexakis, the music video starts off with a radio announcer reading the recorded programming disclaimer (the voice of KHJ newsman Art Kevin) from the KHJ sample, without the jingle. It then shows the band, along with some extra brass players, performing in front of a giant screen. At first, the screen shows a bunch of smileys. As the first verse begins, the screen starts showing TV programs (i.e., The Brady Bunch, Kojak, Hawaii Five-O, H.R. Pufnstuf, Sigmund and the Sea Monsters, Adam-12, Land of the Lost) with Art Alexakis' face edited onto some of the characters to make them sing with the song, or other well-known people, events and styles from the 1970s (i.e., Richard Nixon resigning, Jimmy Page, platform shoes). A few scenes actually have members of Everclear doing 1970s things (i.e., posing in Leisure suits, getting high in a Volkswagen Bus).

== Track listings ==
UK CD single

1. "AM Radio" (radio remix)
2. "Southern Girls"
3. "Santa Monica" (live from Woodstock '99)

Australian CD single

1. "AM Radio" (radio remix) – 3:52
2. "I'm on Your Time" – 3:22
3. "Santa Monica" (live from Woodstock '99) – 5:18

== Charts ==
=== Weekly charts ===
Chart (2000–2001)	Peak position
Australia (ARIA)	142
Canada Rock/Alternative (RPM)	10
Netherlands (Single Top 100)	97
New Zealand (Recorded Music NZ)	32
Scottish Singles Sales (Official Charts)	76
UK Singles (Official Charts)	78
US Bubbling Under Hot 100 (Billboard)	1
US Adult Alternative Airplay (Billboard)	34
US Adult Pop Airplay (Billboard)	17
US Alternative Airplay (Billboard)	15
US Pop Airplay (Billboard)	33

=== Year-end charts ===
Chart (2000)	Position
US Modern Rock Tracks (Billboard)	95

Chart (2001)	Position
US Adult Top 40 (Billboard)	50

== Release history ==
Region	Date	Format(s)	Label(s)	Ref.
United States	August 22, 2000	Alternative radio	Capitol	
United States	October 24, 2000	Contemporary hit radio	Capitol	
United States	October 30, 2000	Hot adult contemporary radio	Capitol	
Australia	January 8, 2001	CD	Capitol	
United Kingdom	March 12, 2001	CD	Capitol	
