= Welcome to the Drama Club =

Studio album by Everclear
- Released: September 12, 2006
- Recorded: 2005
- Genre: Rock
- Length: 54:44
- Label: Eleven Seven Music
- Producer: A. P. Alexakis

Everclear chronology
| Ten Years Gone: The Best of Everclear 1994-2004 (2004) | Welcome to the Drama Club (2006) | The Best of Everclear (2006) |

Singles from Welcome to the Drama Club
- 1. "Hater" Released: August 8, 2006; 2. "Glorious" Released: 2007

Professional ratings
Aggregate scores
| Source | Rating |
|---|---|
| Metacritic | (54/100) |
Review scores
| Source | Rating |
| 411Mania.com | (7.5/10) |
| AllMusic | 3/5 stars |
| Blender | 2/5 stars |
| The Music Box | 3/5 stars |
| PopMatters | 6/10 stars |
| Rolling Stone | 2/5 stars |
| Slant | 3/5 stars |
| Spin | (6/10) |

Welcome to the Drama Club is the seventh studio album from rock band Everclear. It was released on September 12, 2006 by Eleven Seven Music. It was the first album to include the new line-up of Everclear, established following the departure of Craig Montoya and Greg Eklund after Everclear's previous album, Slow Motion Daydream. It was also the first album since Everclear's departure from Capitol Records.

== Track listing ==
All songs written by Art Alexakis.

| No. | Title | Length |
|---|---|---|
| 1. | "Under the Western Stars" | 5:15 |
| 2. | "Now" | 3:31 |
| 3. | "Shine" | 3:53 |
| 4. | "Hater" | 4:15 |
| 5. | "The Drama King" | 3:51 |
| 6. | "Glorious" | 3:44 |
| 7. | "Taste of Hell" | 4:04 |
| 8. | "Portland Rain" | 5:34 |
| 9. | "A Shameless Use of Charm" | 3:35 |
| 10. | "Clean" | 3:34 |
| 11. | "Broken" | 4:21 |
| 12. | "Your Arizona Room" (Includes the hidden track "Beautiful Dream") | 9:27 |

== Personnel ==
- Art Alexakis – lead vocals, guitar
- Davey French – guitar, backing vocals
- Sam Hudson – bass, backing vocals
- Josh Crawley – keyboards, backing vocals
- Brett Snyder – drums, percussion, backing vocals

== Charts ==
Chart performance for Welcome to the Drama Club
| Chart (2006) | Peak position |
|---|---|
| US Billboard 200 | 169 |
| US Independent Albums (Billboard) | 11 |
