= Black Is the New Black =

Studio album by Everclear
- Released: April 24, 2015
- Recorded: 2014
- Genre: Alternative rock; hard rock
- Length: 39:43
- Label: The End

Everclear chronology
Invisible Stars (2012)	Black Is the New Black (2015)

Singles from Black Is the New Black
- 1. "The Man Who Broke His Own Heart" Released: January 27, 2015; 2. "American Monster" Released: March 24, 2015

Professional ratings
Review scores
Source	Rating
AllMusic	3.5/5 stars
Goldmine	4/5 stars
New Noise Magazine	(positive)

Black Is the New Black is the ninth studio album by American alternative rock band Everclear, released on April 24, 2015, by The End Records.

== Track listing ==
All tracks are written by Art Alexakis, except where noted.

No.	Title	Length
1.	"Sugar Noise"	3:12
2.	"The Man Who Broke His Own Heart"	3:56
3.	"American Monster"	3:15
4.	"Complacent"	3:28
5.	"You"	3:52
6.	"This Is Your Death Song" (Alexakis, Chris Brown)	2:25
7.	"Simple and Plain"	3:25
8.	"Anything Is Better Than This"	3:09
9.	"Van Gogh Sun"	4:27
10.	"Pretty Bomb" (Alexakis, Brown)	3:03
11.	"Safe"	5:32

== Charts ==
Chart (2015)	Peak position
New Zealand Albums (RMNZ)	9
US Independent Albums (Billboard)	11
US Top Album Sales (Billboard)	91
US Top Alternative Albums (Billboard)	15
US Top Rock Albums (Billboard)	22
