= The Joker (album) =

Studio album / live album by Steve Miller Band
- Released: October 19, 1973
- Venues: Tower Theater (Philadelphia); Aquarius Theatre (Boston)
- Studio: Capitol (Hollywood)
- Genre: Blues rock
- Length: 35:57
- Label: Capitol
- Producer: Steve Miller

Steve Miller Band chronology
Recall the Beginning...A Journey from Eden (1972)	The Joker (1973)	Fly Like an Eagle (1976)

Singles from The Joker
- 1. "The Joker" Released: October 1973; 2. "Your Cash Ain't Nothin' but Trash" Released: 11 February 1974 (US)

The Joker is a combination live and studio album by Steve Miller Band. The album was recorded at Capitol Studios in 15 days and released by Capitol Records in October 1973. The album marked a period of significant change for the group as the band abandoned their psychedelic-oriented music for a more melodic, smooth rock/blues sound. It was also their first solid commercial success due to the strong radio-play of the title track. The album reached No. 2 on the Billboard Top LPs & Tape chart and has been certified Platinum in the United States. It reached No. 1 on the Cash Box Albums Charts on January 8, 1974.

== Reception ==
Professional ratings
Review scores
Source	Rating
AllMusic	3/5 stars
Christgau's Record Guide	B−
Encyclopedia of Popular Music	3/5 stars

Stephen Thomas Erlewine of AllMusic rated The Joker three out of five stars, calling it "all bright and fun, occasionally truly silly". He also stated that it "isn't mind-expanding", but concluded by saying that it "nevertheless maintains its good-time vibe so well that it's hard not to smile along... provided you're on the same wavelength as Miller, of course."

Record World said of the single "Your Cash Ain't Nothin' But Trash": "A dynamic rocker, it ain't nothin' but the best!"

== Track listing ==
All tracks written by Steve Miller unless otherwise stated.

Side 1
No.	Title	Writer(s)	Length
1.	"Sugar Babe"		4:35
2.	"Mary Lou"	Obie Jessie; Sam Ling	2:24
3.	"Shu Ba Da Du Ma Ma Ma Ma"		5:41
4.	"Your Cash Ain't Nothin' but Trash"	Chuck Calhoun	3:21

Side 2
No.	Title	Writer(s)	Length
5.	"The Joker"	Miller; Eddie Curtis; Ahmet Ertegun	4:26
6.	"The Lovin' Cup"		2:10
7.	"Come On in My Kitchen" (Live at Tower Theater, Philadelphia)	Robert Johnson	4:06
8.	"Evil" (Live at Aquarius Theatre, Boston)		4:35
9.	"Something to Believe In"		4:41

== Personnel ==
- Steve Miller – guitar, vocals, harmonica
- Gerald Johnson – bass guitar (all but 8), vocals
- Dick Thompson – organ, clavinet
- John King – drums

Additional personnel

- Lonnie Turner – bass guitar (8)
- "Sneaky" Pete Kleinow – pedal steel guitar (9)
- John Van Hamersveld and Norman Seeff – album cover design
- Norman Seeff – photography

== Artwork ==
In 2023, Steve Miller posted an essay to his website in celebration of the album's 50th anniversary. In it, he wrote:

"I’m always uncomfortable ‘posing’ and it clearly showed. Norman [Seeff] was sympathetic and said, 'I have an idea, come back tomorrow afternoon and we’ll try again.' When we arrived the next afternoon he had a box full of masks... It was suddenly easy posing with a mask on! He shot me wearing all the masks. The session looked great, the Joker image was created and The Joker was looking like it would be the single and the title for the album."

A deluxe vinyl of the LP was released in 2023 containing extra images from The Joker album photoshoot, with Miller wearing various different masks.

== Charts ==
=== Weekly charts ===
Weekly chart performance for The Joker
Chart (1973–1974)	Peak position
Australian Albums (Kent Music Report)	38
Canada Top Albums/CDs (RPM)	1
US Billboard 200	2

=== Year-end charts ===
Year-end chart performance for The Joker
Chart (1974)	Position
Canada Top Albums/CDs (RPM)	29
US Billboard 200	39

== Certifications ==
Certifications for The Joker
Region	Certification	Certified units/sales
United States (RIAA)	Platinum	1,000,000^{^}
^{^} Shipments figures based on certification alone.
