= Songs from an American Movie Vol. Two: Good Time for a Bad Attitude =

Studio album by Everclear
- Released: November 21, 2000
- Studio: Sunset Sound (Hollywood, California)
- Genre: Alternative rock, post-grunge
- Length: 44:36
- Label: Capitol
- Producer: Art Alexakis

Everclear chronology
| Songs from an American Movie Vol. One: Learning How to Smile (2000) | Songs from an American Movie; Vol. Two: Good Time for a Bad Attitude (2000) | Slow Motion Daydream (2003) |

Singles from Songs from an American Movie Vol. Two: Good Time for a Bad Attitude
- 1. "When It All Goes Wrong Again" Released: 2000; 2. "Out of My Depth" Released: 2001; 3. "Rock Star" Released: 2001

Professional ratings
Aggregate scores
| Source | Rating |
|---|---|
| Metacritic | 65/100 |
Review scores
| Source | Rating |
| AllMusic | 3/5 stars |
| Drowned in Sound | 2/10 |
| Encyclopedia of Popular Music | 4/5 stars |
| Entertainment Weekly | B+ |
| NME | 5/10 |
| Q | 3/5 stars |
| Rolling Stone | 3.5/5 stars |
| Spin | 1/10 |
| Wall of Sound | 77/100 |
| Yahoo! Music UK | 8/10 stars |

Songs from an American Movie Vol. Two: Good Time for a Bad Attitude is the fifth studio album by Everclear, released on November 21, 2000. They recorded Songs from an American Movie Vol. One: Learning How to Smile and Vol. Two in the same year and released them only a few months apart. Both albums are loose concept albums inspired by Art Alexakis' second divorce. The first one is more pop-based and melodic, the second angrier with a more punk/hard rock sound. It also focuses more on the destruction of relationships in its lyrical content.

The album debuted at number 66 on the Billboard charts, significantly below Vol. One's top-ten debut. Furthermore, it does not have a certification from the RIAA, while Vol. One was certified Platinum. However, Vol. Two was certified Gold in Canada in February 2001. None of the singles received any significant airplay on radio or MTV.

"When It All Goes Wrong Again", "Out of My Depth", and "Rock Star" were released as singles from the album. "When It All Goes Wrong Again" was featured on the soundtrack for the 2001 film Antitrust starring Ryan Phillippe, while "Rock Star" was featured for the 2001 film of the same name starring Mark Wahlberg.

"Rock Star" was used in an episode of Ned's Declassified School Survival Guide in 2006.

== Track listing ==
- All songs written by Art Alexakis, Craig Montoya and Greg Eklund

| No. | Title | Length |
|---|---|---|
| 1. | "When It All Goes Wrong Again" | 3:48 |
| 2. | "Slide" | 3:48 |
| 3. | "Babytalk" | 3:02 |
| 4. | "Rock Star" | 3:29 |
| 5. | "Short Blonde Hair" | 3:24 |
| 6. | "Misery Whip" | 4:20 |
| 7. | "Out of My Depth" | 4:32 |
| 8. | "The Good Witch of the North" | 2:39 |
| 9. | "Halloween Americana" | 3:19 |
| 10. | "All Fucked Up" | 3:20 |
| 11. | "Overwhelming" | 4:03 |
| 12. | "Song from an American Movie, Pt. 2" | 4:52 |

== Personnel ==
=== Everclear ===
- Art Alexakis – guitar, vocals
- Craig Montoya – bass guitar
- Greg Eklund – drums

=== Production ===
- Stephen Marcussen – mastering
- Dan Marnien – engineer
- Frank Ockenfels – photography
- Lars Fox – producer, engineer, digital engineer, loops, computers
- Mauricio Iragorri – mixing
- Jeffery Fey – coordination, layout design, layout coordinator
- Sean Cox – guitar technician
- Darren Lewis – executive producer
- Perry Watts-Russell – executive producer
- Geoff Walcha – assistant engineer, vocal engineer, guitar engineer
- Scott Warner – lighting design
- Andy Banton – live sound
- James Beaton – keyboards
- Brett Snyder – drum technician
- Neal Avron – engineer, vocal recording, mixing
- Bradley Cook – engineer, drum recordings
- Kevin Dean – assistant engineer, drum engineering, bass engineer
- Mick Kent – engineer, live sound engineer, production coordination

== Charts ==
Chart performance for Songs from an American Movie Vol. Two: Good Time for a Bad Attitude
| Chart (2000–2001) | Peak position |
|---|---|
| Canadian Albums (Jam!) | 45 |
| Scottish Albums (OCC) | 50 |
| UK Albums (OCC) | 69 |
| US Billboard 200 | 66 |
