= I Will Buy You a New Life =

1998 single by Everclear

Single by Everclear

from the album So Much for the Afterglow
- B-side: "So Much for the Afterglow" (live); "Heroin Girl" (live); "Local God" (live)
- Released: March 31, 1998
- Studio: Whitehorse (Portland, Oregon)
- Genre: Alternative rock
- Length: 3:58
- Label: Capitol
- Songwriters: Art Alexakis; Greg Eklund; Craig Montoya
- Producers: Art Alexakis; Neal Avron

Everclear singles chronology
"Everything to Everyone" (1997)	"I Will Buy You a New Life" (1998)	"Father of Mine" (1998)

Music video
- "I Will Buy You a New Life" on YouTube

"I Will Buy You a New Life" is a rock song by American rock band Everclear from their third studio album, So Much for the Afterglow (1997). The song peaked at number three on the US Billboard Modern Rock Tracks chart, number 20 on the Billboard Adult Top 40 chart, and number 31 on the Billboard Mainstream Top 40 chart. In Canada, it reached number 49 on the RPM 100 Hit Tracks chart and number one on the RPM Alternative 30 chart.

== Track listing ==
Australian CD single

1. "I Will Buy You a New Life"
2. "So Much for the Afterglow" (live)
3. "Heroin Girl" (live)
4. "Local God" (live)

== Charts ==
=== Weekly charts ===
Chart (1998)	Peak position
Canada Top Singles (RPM)	49
Canada Rock/Alternative (RPM)	1
US Radio Songs (Billboard)	33
US Adult Pop Airplay (Billboard)	20
US Alternative Airplay (Billboard)	3
US Mainstream Rock (Billboard)	20
US Pop Airplay (Billboard)	31

=== Year-end charts ===
Chart (1998)	Position
Canada Rock/Alternative (RPM)	24
US Hot 100 Airplay (Billboard)	73
US Adult Top 40 (Billboard)	44
US Mainstream Rock Tracks (Billboard)	84
US Modern Rock Tracks (Billboard)	9

== Release history ==
Region	Date	Format(s)	Label(s)	Ref.
United States	March 31, 1998	Contemporary hit radio	Capitol	
