= World of Noise =

Studio album by Everclear
- Released: December 10, 1993
- Recorded: Early–mid 1993
- Genre: Punk rock
- Length: 33:32
- Labels: Tim/Kerr (original release); Capitol (1994 reissue); Fire (1995 UK reissue)
- Producer: Art Alexakis

Everclear chronology
Nervous & Weird (1993)	World of Noise (1993)	Sparkle and Fade (1995)

Singles from World of Noise
- 1. "Fire Maple Song" Released: 1994

Professional ratings
Review scores
Source	Rating
AllMusic	3/5 stars
Christgau's Consumer Guide	(neither)
Collector's Guide to Heavy Metal	8/10
The Encyclopedia of Popular Music	3/5 stars
The Great Rock Discography	6/10
Kerrang!	5/5 stars
MusicHound Rock	3.5/5 stars
The Rolling Stone Album Guide	2.5/5 stars

World of Noise is the debut album recorded by American rock band Everclear. It was recorded in a friend's basement for $400 with Art Alexakis on vocals/lead guitar, Craig Montoya on bass, Scott Cuthbert on drums and was released in 1993 by Tim Kerr Records.

== Background ==
Alexakis used a beat-up Guild Bluesbird guitar to perform the album. For an amp, Alexakis used a Fender Super Twin with a blown 6L6 tube that would squeal every time Art hit a chord. Often, the amp would overheat and start smoking. When that happened, they would put icepacks on the back and let it cool down, then get back to recording the demo. Despite the problems, Alexakis' amp ended up giving the album a uniquely raucous, noisy sound.

The album was originally never meant to be released, but rather a demo. After finishing the initial sessions, the band compiled a cassette and sold it at shows. Once more material was complete, the band swapped out a couple of songs and issued the album on Tim/Kerr. The original self-released cassette included "Drunk Again", which later appeared on the Nervous & Weird EP and lacked "Nervous & Weird".

When the band signed with Capitol Records in 1994, the label agreed to re-release the album, and remastered it to try to improve the sound. Capitol released their version of the album on November 1, 1994.

The song "Loser Makes Good" was written about an insane homeless man that shot and killed Art's friend, Phillip Bury, better known by his stage name "Buck Naked" of "Buck Naked and the Barebottom Boys", who released their only album on Alexakis's label, Shindig Records.

== 30th Anniversary Deluxe Edition ==
In the early 2000s, rights to the album reverted to Alexakis, who planned to remix the album and reissue it on his own label, Popularity Recordings. However, problems at his label (and its subsequent closure) temporarily shelved the project until June 10, 2022, when it was finally given a deluxe re-issue on vinyl and for the first time on digital and streaming platforms. All reissued versions of the album featured bonus songs which included most of the band's White Trash Hell EP, along with two previously unreleased songs.

== Track listing ==
All lyrics are written by Art Alexakis; all music is composed by Everclear.

No.	Title	Length
1.	"Your Genius Hands"	2:44
2.	"Sick and Tired"	3:54
3.	"The Laughing World"	2:04
4.	"Fire Maple Song"	4:15
5.	"Pennsylvania Is..."	2:25
6.	"Nervous and Weird"	2:31
7.	"Malevolent"	2:33
8.	"Sparkle"	2:39
9.	"Trust Fund"	1:52
10.	"Loser Makes Good"	2:54
11.	"Invisible"	2:54
12.	"Evergleam"	2:51

30th Anniversary bonus tracks
No.	Title	Length
13.	"Drunk Again (previously unreleased)"	3:02
14.	"Pacific Wonderland"	1:55
15.	"Blondes"	2:16
16.	"Detroit"	3:24
17.	"1975"	3:14
18.	"Nervous & Weird 2001 Remix (previously unreleased)"	2:33

== Personnel ==
- Art Alexakis - lead guitar, vocals, producer, engineer, & mixer
- Craig Montoya - bass, movement
- Scott Cuthbert - drums, vocals
- Karl Brummer - engineer, mixer
