= Wonderful (Everclear song) =

2000 song by Everclear

Single by Everclear

from the album Songs from an American Movie Vol. One: Learning How to Smile
- B-side: "Father of Mine" (remix); "I'm On Your Time"
- Released: May 22, 2000
- Length: 4:41 (album version); 4:32 (edit)
- Label: Capitol; EMI
- Songwriters: Art Alexakis; Greg Eklund; Craig Montoya
- Producers: Art Alexakis; Lars Fox; Neal Avron

Everclear singles chronology
"The Boys Are Back in Town" (1999)	"Wonderful" (2000)	"AM Radio" (2000)

Music video
- "Wonderful" on YouTube

"Wonderful" is a song by American rock band Everclear, released as the first single from their fourth studio album, Songs from an American Movie Vol. One: Learning How to Smile (2000), on May 22, 2000. The song reached number 11 on the US Billboard Hot 100, becoming the band's only top-40 hit on the Hot 100. Outside the United States, "Wonderful" reached number 12 in Iceland, number 13 in Canada, number 21 in New Zealand, number 36 in the United Kingdom, and number 38 in Australia. In Canada, the single topped the RPM Top 30 Rock Report.

== Meaning ==
The song "Wonderful" tells the story of a divorce as perceived by a child. Each verse of the song corresponds to a different stage of the divorce. The first verse describes the child hearing their parents fight as they try to block it out, remembering what it was like before their parents began to fight. The second verse describes the child going to school and pretending to their friends that everything is all right at home, despite what is heard in the first verse. The bridge describes the child lashing out at their parents, not wanting to comprehend that their parents have begun to grow apart and date other people.

In an October 2003 interview with Songfacts, Art Alexakis said about "Wonderful":

I was a child of a broken marriage, my daughter was the child of a broken marriage, and it was hard to watch it happen to her. (This song) was me trying to make sense of it. ... It's one of those songs where I take my experiences as a kid, some experiences of some friends of mine, and kind of put myself into this kid's place. It's not really autobiographical but it's coming from a place that I understand very well. My characters tend to have aspects of my personality. It wouldn't be real if it didn't have a part of my reality.

== Music video ==
The music video, directed by Alexakis, follows two children's stories interlaced with the band singing. The children are shown happy initially but as time passes their parents fight and eventually break up. At school the kids act normal, mirroring the song. The video ends with kids jumping and happy while the band plays, sometimes in the middle of the kids. The two kids the video is about are split into two people, with each one going a different directions assumingly toward each divorced parent. The kids leave school with a smile. Alexakis can also be seen wiping a tear from his eye near the end of the video.

== Track listings ==
US CD single

1. "Wonderful"
2. "Father of Mine" (remix)
3. "I'm On Your Time"

UK CD single

1. "Wonderful"
2. "Father of Mine" (remix)
3. "I'm On Your Time"
4. Enhanced section (video & photos)

European and Australian maxi-CD single

1. "Wonderful"
2. "Southern Girls"
3. "Speed Racer"

== Charts ==
=== Weekly charts ===
Chart (2000)	Peak position
Australia (ARIA)	38
Canada Top Singles (RPM)	13
Canada Adult Contemporary (RPM)	29
Canada Rock/Alternative (RPM)	1
Iceland (Íslenski Listinn Topp 40)	12
New Zealand (Recorded Music NZ)	21
Quebec Airplay (ADISQ)	1
Scottish Singles Sales (Official Charts)	31
UK Singles (Official Charts)	36
US Billboard Hot 100	11
US Adult Alternative Airplay (Billboard)	2
US Adult Pop Airplay (Billboard)	3
US Alternative Airplay (Billboard)	3
US Mainstream Rock (Billboard)	28
US Pop Airplay (Billboard)	13

=== Year-end charts ===
Chart (2000)	Position
Iceland (Íslenski Listinn Topp 40)	99
US Billboard Hot 100	54
US Adult Top 40 (Billboard)	19
US Mainstream Top 40 (Billboard)	44
US Modern Rock Tracks (Billboard)	18
US Triple-A (Billboard)	15

== Release history ==
Region	Date	Format(s)	Label	Ref(s).
United States	May 22–23, 2000	Mainstream rock; active rock; alternative radio	Capitol	
United States	June 26, 2000	Hot adult contemporary; modern adult contemporary radio	Capitol	
United States	June 27, 2000	Contemporary hit radio	Capitol	
United Kingdom	October 2, 2000	CD	Capitol	

== Appearances in media ==
The song has been featured in several TV series, including the Scrubs season 1 episode "My Fifteen Minutes", the Cold Case season 3 episode "Dog Day Afternoons", the Jericho episode "Why We Fight", the Daria episode "Sappy Anniversary", and the episode "Wonderful" from Mysterious Ways. It has also been featured in the movies Pay It Forward, 40 Days and 40 Nights, Cheats, and Saving Silverman.
