= Everything to Everyone (song) =

Single by Everclear

from the album So Much for the Afterglow
- Released: September 9, 1997
- Genre: Alternative rock; pop-punk
- Length: 3:20
- Label: Capitol
- Songwriters: Art Alexakis; Greg Eklund; Craig Montoya
- Producers: Art Alexakis; Neal Avron

Everclear singles chronology
"You Make Me Feel Like a Whore" (1996)	"Everything to Everyone" (1997)	"I Will Buy You a New Life" (1997)

Music video
- "Everything to Everyone" on YouTube

"Everything to Everyone" is a song by American alternative rock band Everclear, released as the first single off their album So Much for the Afterglow (1997). It was commercially successful, topping the US Billboard Modern Rock Tracks chart in December 1997. It also hit No. 15 on the Mainstream Rock Tracks chart, and No. 43 on the Hot 100 Airplay chart, as chart rules at the time prevented it from reaching the main Hot 100 listing.

The song was used in the film American Pie, but did not appear on the soundtrack.

A music video was produced to promote the single.

== Content ==
In an October 2003 interview with Songfacts, lead singer Art Alexakis explained the meaning behind "Everything to Everyone":

It's kind of an angry song. That person is within everybody, I think everybody has this ability to try and be everything to everyone, to try to please. I think there are two aspects of it - there's the pleaser, who doesn't always show his true self, always plays nice and as time goes on shows more and more of himself, but there's also the people who are everything to everyone who are manipulators and users.

When asked if the song had "anything to do with the record business", Alexakis replied, "Oh yeah. Anything in the entertainment business you'll find people who are slimy."

== Charts ==
Chart (1997–1998)	Peak position
Australia (ARIA)	40
Canada Top Singles (RPM)	25
Canada Rock/Alternative (RPM)	1
Scottish Singles Sales (Official Charts)	37
UK Singles (Official Charts)	41
US Radio Songs (Billboard)	43
US Alternative Airplay (Billboard)	1
US Mainstream Rock (Billboard)	15
