= Father of Mine =

1998 single by Everclear

Single by Everclear

from the album So Much for the Afterglow
- Released: July 6, 1998
- Genre: Alternative rock
- Length: 3:51 (album version); 3:47 (radio mix)
- Label: Capitol
- Songwriters: Art Alexakis; Greg Eklund; Craig Montoya
- Producers: Art Alexakis; Neal Avron

Everclear singles chronology
"I Will Buy You a New Life" (1997)	"Father of Mine" (1998)	"So Much for the Afterglow" (1998)

Music video
- "Father of Mine" on YouTube

"Father of Mine" is a rock song by American rock band Everclear from their 1997 album So Much for the Afterglow. This song is autobiographical, as lead singer Art Alexakis's father left his family when he was a young boy. "Father of Mine" was the third top-five Modern Rock Tracks single from So Much for the Afterglow, peaking at number four. It also hit number 23 and 24 on the Adult Top 40 and Mainstream Top 40 charts, respectively. This song is also recorded in a radio mix, which can be heard on Ten Years Gone: The Best of Everclear 1994-2004.

== Content ==
In an October 2003 interview with Songfacts, Art Alexakis explained the inspiration behind "Father of Mine":

That song is one of the very very few songs that are autobiographical. To answer your question, my feelings for my father haven't necessarily changed, but my feelings about myself after writing that song have been much better. It was a kind of catharsis to put those feelings into words, it's a way for me to get things out of my system. The song "Wonderful" is very much like that too. I was a child of a broken marriage, and my daughter was the child of a broken marriage, and it was hard to watch it happen to her. That was me trying to make sense of it. I don't know (if my dad ever heard the song). I'm assuming he did. I know the two girls he raised, his step-daughters heard it and were mad at me about it.

== Music video ==
The music video, directed by Paul Hunter, starts with a young boy (played by Steven Anthony Lawrence) and his father spending time together. The father and mother get in a fight and the father leaves. The boy and mother then move to a black neighborhood (the boy is the only white person there). It skips to when the boy is a couple of years older and living in the neighborhood. He watches Everclear perform on TV. It then skips to when the boy is a teenager and hits the winning run at a baseball game while Alexakis sings in the background. The baseball breaks through a window into an area where a group of rockers are hanging out. The video then shows clips from the different time periods in the boy's life and shows Alexakis with his wife and kids. The video ends with the youngest boy following his dad out to the car as his dad drives off. It then shows the apartment he moved to and zooms out to the band playing in a room that overlooks the apartment.

== Charts ==
Chart (1998–1999)	Peak position
Australia (ARIA)	140
Canada Top Singles (RPM)	50
US Billboard Hot 100	70
US Radio Songs (Billboard)	46
US Adult Pop Airplay (Billboard)	23
US Alternative Airplay (Billboard)	4
US Mainstream Rock (Billboard)	29
US Pop Airplay (Billboard)	24
