= So Much for the Afterglow =

Studio album by Everclear
- Released: October 7, 1997
- Recorded: November 1996 – March 1997
- Genres: Pop rock; alternative rock; power pop; alternative pop
- Length: 49:11
- Label: Capitol
- Producers: Art Alexakis; Neal Avron; Lars Fox

Everclear chronology
White Trash Hell (1997)	So Much for the Afterglow (1997)	Songs from an American Movie Vol. One: Learning How to Smile (2000)

Singles from So Much for the Afterglow
- 1. "Everything to Everyone" Released: September 9, 1997; 2. "I Will Buy You a New Life" Released: March 31, 1998; 3. "Father of Mine" Released: July 6, 1998; 4. "So Much for the Afterglow" Released: 1998; 5. "One Hit Wonder" Released: 1999

So Much for the Afterglow is the third studio album by American alternative rock band Everclear, released on October 7, 1997, through Capitol Records. It contained the singles "Everything to Everyone", "I Will Buy You a New Life", "Father of Mine", "So Much for the Afterglow", and "One Hit Wonder". The former three singles received heavy rotation on MTV's Total Request Live and launched Everclear into mainstream popularity in the late-90s. So Much for the Afterglow provided Everclear with their only Grammy nomination to date, a Best Rock Instrumental nod in 1998 for "El Distorto de Melodica." The album is considered a departure from the band's earlier punk rock and grunge sound for a more pop-oriented sound.

So Much for the Afterglow debuted at number 33 on the Billboard 200 chart, selling 34,000 in its first week of release. It stayed on the chart for 88 weeks, and was certified 2× Platinum by the RIAA in 1998. It remains Everclear's best selling album, having sold 2.2 million copies in the United States by July 2004.

== Production ==
The album was originally going to be called Pure White Evil; however, the title was changed to So Much for the Afterglow in March 1997.

Early on, singer Art Alexakis wanted to create "a combination of even heavier songs, more punk songs, and then kind of more melodic stuff." By the time touring for Sparkle and Fade ended and recording began, the direction of the album shifted. Alexakis remarked to MTV that, "the fact is, Sparkle and Fade was a rock record with pop influences; this time we tried to make a pop record with rock influences." Regarding the recording process, Greg Eklund reflected, "We rented a room in a warehouse, oddly enough by Esco Steel, where I used to work, in Northwest Portland. We were literally around the corner from where I used to work in a steel foundry. I don't know how we found it, but it was in a really dilapidated warehouse down there. And Craig got, like, shingles and some weird flu that put him in the hospital or something. So I remember when we started working on Art's new songs it was just him and me." He also noted there was pressure to follow up the success of the song "Santa Monica", commenting "We'd had some success with "Santa Monica" but there was a really big question mark whether we'd be able to continue that. You know what everybody says—you have 10 years to write your first record and six months to write your second. Art was a good songwriter, so I knew we had good songs, but it was sorta like, 'Wow, if this doesn't go, this might all end right here.'"

Pro Tools were utilized during the recording, including on the song "El Distorto de Melodica", which was composed in Pro Tools by associate producer Lars Fox, using techniques he'd developed while with his band, Grotus. On earlier Everclear releases, Alexakis sped up the tapes of songs to make them faster and more energetic. Due to Pro Tools, he was able to speed up songs without having his pitch altered. Fox recalled that "Everything to Everyone" was sped up by ten percent. He remarked, "If he'd sung it and sped it up that much he'd sound like Mickey Mouse. He'd sound like a chipmunk. So he sung it with the track already sped up some percentage."

The final mixes for So Much for the Afterglow were completed in June 1997.

=== Promotion ===
Following a run of shows in the US during late 1997, Everclear had a troubled tour of Australia, which saw the band temporarily break up, with bassist Craig Montoya eventually leaving the tour. At the time, MTV News stated, "Media reports from down under reveal that Montoya's bass was stolen at the Extreme Games concert on the Gold Coast; a firecracker or pipe bomb was thrown on the stage in Melbourne; and that Alexakis was hit in the face by a shoe in Wollongong. [Australian music industry columnist Christie] Eliezer's column also reports that following the theft of the guitar, Alexakis swore at the audience and made a reference to 'the worst kind of **** convicts' and dropped his pants and dedicated the final song to the cursed thief." Alexakis later claimed the behaviour of the Australian fans didn't lead to friction, saying "The problem wasn't with me. The problem was that the other people were having a hard time. Look, I love Australia! Especially Melbourne. Every time I go down there, I almost don't wanna come back. I love it there." Eklund also elaborated, "That's complete bullshit. That's a retelling of what happened. I love Australia, too. It's one of my favorite places in the world. That's not what happened."

== Reception ==
Professional ratings
Review scores
Source	Rating
AllMusic	4/5 stars
Chicago Tribune	2.5/4 stars
Entertainment Weekly	C+
The Guardian	4/5 stars
Los Angeles Times	3.5/4 stars
Pitchfork	8.2/10
Rolling Stone	2.5/5 stars
The Rolling Stone Album Guide	3.5/5 stars
Spin	8/10
The Village Voice	B+

So Much for the Afterglow received a mostly positive reaction from critics. The Orlando Sentinel observed in their review that, "It almost seems that Everclear is writing a soundtrack for their lives by singing about the 'girl next door', poverty, egotistical snobs and a father who abandons his family. Though Everclear does tackle some depressing subjects, their songs don't become Pearl Jam-like depress-fests because of the band's positive outlook and upbeat music." Spin claimed the album explored "oddly grown-up topics for alt-rock", also noting similarities with the band's previous work, stating "On Sparkle and Fade, the centerpieces 'Santa Monica' and 'Summerland' deal expressly with escaping to begin a new life in a new place, west of here, beside the ocean if at all possible. Now in 'Amphetamine', Miss Perfect-in-a-Fucked-Up-Way comes 'out West to find the sun'". Rolling Stone gave the album a mixed review, stating "the songs on So Much for the Afterglow manage only to present a series of victims, objects of leadman Art Alexakis' confused contempt or peculiarly mopey brand of compassion: the neglectful ne'er-do-well of 'Father of Mine'; the people-pleasing nymphet of the first single, 'Everything to Everyone'; the two-dimensional 'magazine girl' of 'Amphetamine'. Alexakis seems incapable of irony, depicting these people in a manner that's never less than heavy-handed."

=== Legacy and accolades ===
The New York Times included So Much for the Afterglow on their "Best of '97" list in January 1998, writing "With loud, obnoxious songs that confront the crisis of the family, monogamy's perils and the vise grip of money, from the perspective of a punk trying not to self-destruct for a change, Everclear is perfecting rebel rock for adults." In 2017, The Dallas Morning News included So Much for the Afterglow in an article titled "Flash back to 1997: 5 albums that were as good 20 years ago as they are today", noting that it took the band from "one-hit wonder to modern rock headliner."

Everclear toured the US and Australia in 2017 to celebrate the album's 20th anniversary.

== Track listing ==
All lyrics are written by Art Alexakis; all music is composed by Alexakis, Craig Montoya, and Greg Eklund.

No.	Title	Length
1.	"So Much for the Afterglow"	3:53
2.	"Everything to Everyone"	3:20
3.	"Ataraxia (Media Intro)" (Actually an excerpt from "The Relaxed Wife.")	0:34
4.	"Normal Like You"	3:13
5.	"I Will Buy You a New Life"	3:58
6.	"Father of Mine"	3:52
7.	"One Hit Wonder"	3:28
8.	"El Distorto de Melodica (Instrumental)"	3:07
9.	"Amphetamine"	3:36
10.	"White Men in Black Suits"	3:32
11.	"Sunflowers"	3:48
12.	"Why I Don't Believe in God"	4:17
13.	"Like a California King" (Contains hidden track "Hating You for Christmas")	8:08

Australian edition
No.	Title	Length
13.	"Like a California King"	3:37
14.	"Local God" (Contains hidden track "Hating You for Christmas")	8:30

Japanese edition
No.	Title	Length
13.	"Like a California King"	3:35
14.	"Southern Girls" (Cheap Trick cover)	2:51
15.	"Speed Racer" (Contains hidden track "Hating You for Christmas")	7:01

Outtakes
No.	Title	Length
1.	"This Is Your Death Song" (Re-recorded for Black Is the New Black)	2:28

== Personnel ==
Band

- Art Alexakis - banjo, guitar, mandolin, piano, steel guitar, keyboards, vocals, producer, vocal arrangement, horn arrangements, string arrangements, cover art concept, cover design, toy piano, Moog
- Greg Eklund - percussion, drums, keyboards, vocals, assistant producer, slide whistle
- Craig Montoya - mandolin, bass guitar, keyboards, sound effects, vocals, assistant producer

Additional musicians

- Paul Cantelon - violin
- Derron Nuhfer - saxophone
- Buddy Schaub - trombone
- Gerri Sutyak - cello
- Rami Jaffee - Vox organ

Production

- Neal Avron - trumpet, producer, engineer, vocal arrangement, horn arrangements, mixing
- Tom Banghart - assistant engineer
- Mike Baumgartner - assistant engineer
- Steven Birch - coordination, art direction, design, cover art concept, cover design
- Ian Blanch - mixing assistant
- Nick Brophy - assistant engineer
- Lars Fox - sampling, loops, assistant producer
- Dave Friedlander - assistant engineer
- Krista Gaylor - photography
- Bill Jackson - assistant engineer
- Bob Ludwig - mastering
- Frank Ockenfels - photography, cover art
- Ronnie Rivera - assistant engineer
- Jim Rondinelli - engineer, string arrangements, assistant producer
- Kenneth A. Van Druten - assistant engineer
- Andy Wallace - mixing
- Perry Watts-Russell - Executive producer
- Joe Zook - editing, editing assistant, transfer assistant

== Charts ==
=== Weekly charts ===
Chart (1997–1998)	Peak position
Australian Albums (ARIA)	19
New Zealand Albums (RMNZ)	5
Scottish Albums (Official Charts)	94
UK Albums (Official Charts)	63
US Billboard 200	33

=== Year-end charts ===
Chart (1998)	Position
US Billboard 200	74
Chart (1999)	Position
US Billboard 200	112

== Certifications ==
Region	Certification	Certified units/sales
Australia (ARIA)	Gold	35,000^{^}
^{^} Shipments figures based on certification alone.
