= Sparkle and Fade =

Studio album by Everclear
- Released: May 23, 1995
- Recorded: September 1994
- Studios: Smart (Madison); A&M (Hollywood); Electric Lady (New York City); Rondor (Los Angeles)
- Genres: Alternative rock; pop-punk; grunge
- Length: 42:47
- Label: Capitol
- Producers: Art Alexakis; Brian Malouf; Michael Douglass

Everclear chronology
World of Noise (1993)	Sparkle and Fade (1995)	White Trash Hell (1997)

Singles from Sparkle and Fade
- 1. "Heroin Girl" Released: 1995; 2. "Santa Monica" Released: December 5, 1995; 3. "Heartspark Dollarsign" Released: March 23, 1996; 4. "You Make Me Feel Like a Whore" Released: 1996

Professional ratings
Review scores
Source	Rating
AllMusic	4/5 stars
Collector's Guide to Heavy Metal	10/10
The Encyclopedia of Popular Music	4/5 stars
The Great Rock Discography	9/10
Kerrang!	4/5 stars
MusicHound Rock	4/5 stars
The Rolling Stone Album Guide	4/5 stars
The Village Voice	A−

Sparkle and Fade is the second album by American rock band Everclear, released in 1995. It was their first album to be released exclusively on Capitol Records; their previous effort, World of Noise, was re-released on Capitol after its introduction through the Portland, Oregon based label, Tim/Kerr Records. The album produced the singles "Heroin Girl", "Santa Monica", "Heartspark Dollarsign", and "You Make Me Feel Like a Whore". The album's music follows themes like addiction and romance through a loosely defined narrative similar to Art Alexakis' own troubled life when he was in his twenties.

The album's cover features childhood pictures of the three members of the band. It is Everclear's third-best-selling album to date. It climbed to the top of the Heatseekers Chart in January 1996 and was certified Platinum by the RIAA in May 1996. By December 2001, the album had sold 1,190,000 copies in the United States, according to Nielsen SoundScan.

== Critical reception ==
Trouser Press wrote that "the sheer radiance of songs like 'Santa Monica' (which demands repeated listens) adds to the luster of this unexpected gem."

== 30th Anniversary Deluxe Edition ==
In November 2025 the band released a remastered deluxe edition to celebrate the album's 30th anniversary. Also included in the deluxe edition were unreleased tracks, alternate versions of fan favorites, original demos and cover songs that were recorded during the Sparkle and Fade sessions.

== Track listing ==
All songs written by Art Alexakis, Craig Montoya, and Greg Eklund, except where noted.

No.	Title	Writer(s)	Length
1.	"Electra Made Me Blind"	Alexakis; Scott Cuthbert; Montoya	3:43
2.	"Heroin Girl"	Alexakis; Cuthbert; Montoya	2:23
3.	"You Make Me Feel Like a Whore"		2:47
4.	"Santa Monica"		3:11
5.	"Summerland"		3:42
6.	"Strawberry"		2:35
7.	"Heartspark Dollarsign"		2:52
8.	"The Twistinside"	Alexakis; Cuthbert; Montoya	4:37
9.	"Her Brand New Skin"		2:02
10.	"Nehalem"		1:53
11.	"Queen of the Air"	Alexakis; Cuthbert; Montoya	2:59
12.	"Pale Green Stars"		4:17
13.	"Chemical Smile"		1:49
14.	"My Sexual Life"	Alexakis; Cuthbert; Montoya	3:51

30th anniversary bonus tracks
No.	Title	Length
15.	"Hateful"	1:36
16.	"Rocket Tattoo"	2:34
17.	"Annabella's Song"	3:26
18.	"Happy Hour"	2:10
19.	"American Girl" (Tom Petty and the Heartbreakers)	3:35
20.	"Don't Change" (INXS)	3:43
21.	"Sin City" (AC/DC)	4:34
22.	"Walk, Don't Run" (Johnny Smith)	2:01

== Personnel ==
Personnel per liner notes.

Everclear

- Art Alexakis – guitar, lead vocals
- Greg Eklund – drums, vocals
- Craig Montoya – bass, vocals

Production

- Art Alexakis – production
- Brian Malouf – co-producer, mixing (at Electric Lady)
- Michael Douglass – co-producer, recording (at Smart and A&M)
- Mike Urkell – assistant engineer (at Smart Studios)
- Brian Sperber – assistant engineer, recording (at Electric Lady)
- Alex Reed – recording assistant (at A&M)
- P. Castellano – recording assistant (at Electric Lady)
- Nick Brophy – recording (at Rondor)
- Bill Jackson – recording assistant (at Rondor)
- Bob Ludwig – mastering (at Gateway Mastering), sequencing (8–14)
- Rich Breen – sequencing (1–7)

Artwork

- Art Alexakis – cover design concept
- Steven Birch – graphic design, layout
- Marc Tunz – band photography
- Debbie Desantes –live photo

== Charts ==
=== Weekly charts ===
Chart (1995–1996)	Peak position
Australian Albums (ARIA)	9
Canada Top Albums/CDs (RPM)	39
New Zealand Albums (RMNZ)	20
US Billboard 200	25

=== Year-end charts ===
Chart (1996)	Position
Australian Albums (ARIA)	45
New Zealand Albums (RMNZ)	39
US Billboard 200	88

== Certifications ==
Region	Certification	Certified units/sales
Australia (ARIA)	Platinum	70,000^{^}
Canada (Music Canada)	Platinum	100,000^{^}
United States (RIAA)	Platinum	1,190,000
^{^} Shipments figures based on certification alone.
