= Songs from an American Movie Vol. One: Learning How to Smile =

Studio album by Everclear
- Released: July 11, 2000
- Genre: Pop, rock
- Length: 45:18
- Label: Capitol
- Producer: Art Alexakis, Lars Fox, Neal Avron

Everclear chronology
So Much for the Afterglow (1997)	Songs from an American Movie; Vol. One: Learning How to Smile (2000)	Songs from an American Movie Vol. Two: Good Time for a Bad Attitude (2000)

Singles from Songs from an American Movie Vol. One: Learning How to Smile
- 1. "Wonderful" Released: May 22, 2000; 2. "AM Radio" Released: August 22, 2000; 3. "Brown Eyed Girl" Released: April 23, 2001

Professional ratings
Aggregate scores
Source	Rating
Metacritic	57/100
Review scores
Source	Rating
AllMusic	3.5/5 stars
Alternative Press	4/5
Entertainment Weekly	B−
Los Angeles Times	2.5/4 stars
Melody Maker	4/5 stars
NME	4/10
Q	4/5 stars
Rolling Stone	2.5/5 stars
The Rolling Stone Album Guide	4/5 stars
The Village Voice	A−

Songs from an American Movie Vol. One: Learning How to Smile is the fourth studio album by American alternative rock band Everclear, released on July 11, 2000. The album (along with its sequel, Songs from an American Movie Vol. Two: Good Time for a Bad Attitude) is a loose concept album inspired by lead singer Art Alexakis's second divorce. The first album is much more influenced by American pop music, especially from the 1970s, as well as being more "loving" in tone than the hard rock Good Time for a Bad Attitude. The album is dedicated to David Ridderhof and Louis Montoya.

Learning How to Smile is the band's second highest selling album ever with 1.28 million copies sold and a Platinum certification by the RIAA. It is also the band's only album to debut in the top ten on the Billboard 200, where it peaked at number nine.

== Track listing ==
All lyrics written by Art Alexakis, all music composed by Alexakis, Craig Montoya and Greg Eklund, unless otherwise noted.

No.	Title	Length
1.	"Song from an American Movie, Pt. 1"	1:39
2.	"Here We Go Again" (samples "Bring the Noise" by Public Enemy)	4:10
3.	"AM Radio" (samples "Mr. Big Stuff" by Jean Knight)	3:56
4.	"Brown Eyed Girl" (Van Morrison cover)	4:21
5.	"Learning How to Smile"	3:50
6.	"The Honeymoon Song" (Eklund/Everclear)	3:38
7.	"Now That It's Over"	3:49
8.	"Thrift Store Chair"	2:08
9.	"Otis Redding"	3:56
10.	"Unemployed Boyfriend"	4:15
11.	"Wonderful"	5:01
12.	"Annabella's Song"	4:55

On the original 2000 release of the album, the divide between tracks 11 and 12 was in the middle of "Annabella's Song." A reissue in 2001 corrected this error, as well as replacing the album version of "AM Radio" with the single mix and adding two bonus tracks: "Out of My Depth (single mix)" and "Rock Star."

== Personnel ==
Credits are adapted from the album's liner notes.

Everclear

- Art Alexakis – vocals, guitar, banjo, steel guitar, percussion, co-producer
- Craig Montoya – bass, backing vocals, mandolin, percussion
- Greg Eklund – drums, backing vocals, lead vocals on "The Honeymoon Song," ukulele, orchestra bells, percussion

Additional personnel

- James Beaton – keyboard
- Lars Fox – co-producer, percussion, backing vocals
- Neal Avron – co-producer
- Roy Lott – executive producer
- Perry Watts-Russell – executive producer
- Mike Kent – additional production and recording
- Sean Cox – studio assistant
- Andy Banton – studio assistant
- Mike Ternyik – studio assistant
- Charlie Paakkari – 2nd engineer
- Frank W. Ockenfels III – photography

== Charts ==
=== Weekly charts ===
Chart (2000)	Peak position
Australian Albums (ARIA)	31
Canadian Albums (Billboard)	3
New Zealand Albums (RMNZ)	29
Scottish Albums (OCC)	39
UK Albums (OCC)	51
US Billboard 200	9

=== Year-end charts ===
Chart (2000)	Position
US Billboard 200	140
