= Art Alexakis =

American musician (born 1962)

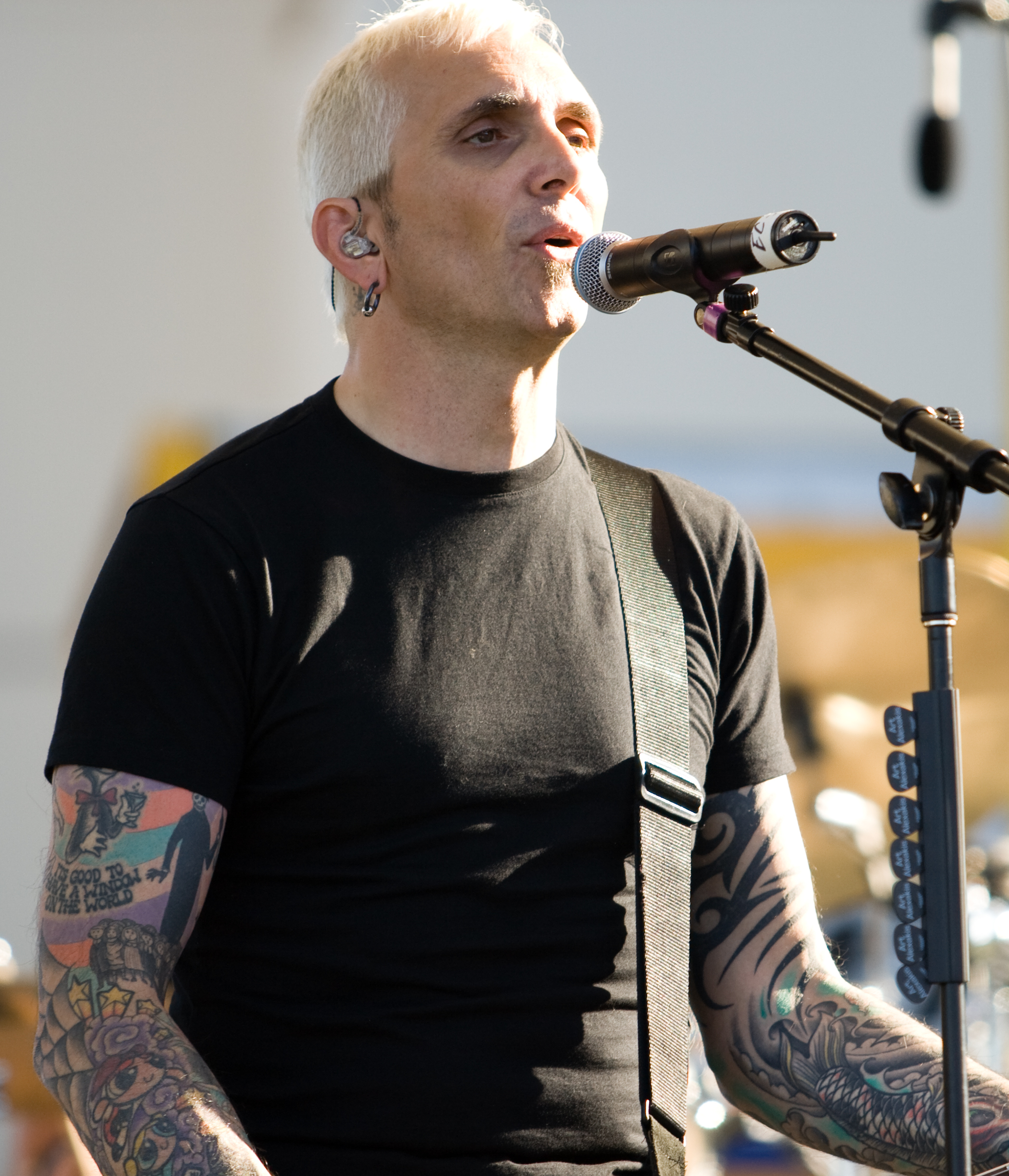
- Alexakis performing at Emory University, September 2007

Background information
- Born: Arthur Paul Alexakis; April 12, 1962 (age 64); Los Angeles, California, United States
- Genres: Alternative rock; post-grunge; power pop; grunge; punk rock
- Occupations: Musician; singer-songwriter; A&R representative; political activist; actor
- Instruments: Vocals; guitar; bass; piano; mandolin; banjo
- Years active: 1985–present
- Labels: The End Records; Eleven Seven Music; Capitol; Tim/Kerr; Shindig
- Member of: Everclear
- Formerly of: Colorfinger; The Easy Hoes; Shakin' Brave
- Website: everclearmusic.com

Arthur Paul Alexakis (born April 12, 1962) is an American musician best known as the singer-songwriter and guitarist of the rock band Everclear. He has been a member of several other bands in addition to his own work as a songwriter for other artists. Alexakis has founded several record labels throughout his career and worked as an A&R representative for major record labels between and during his own musical projects. Later he became a political activist and lobbied for special concerns which include drug awareness policies and support for the families of the military.

== Early life ==
Alexakis was born in Los Angeles, the youngest of five children. When Art was five years old his father left the family, and financial difficulties forced his mother to relocate the family to the Mar Vista Gardens housing project in California, located on the west side of Los Angeles in Del Rey. When Alexakis was 8 years old, he was beaten and sexually assaulted by older children in his neighborhood.

His brother George died of a heroin overdose in 1974, when Alexakis was 12. That same year, Alexakis's 15-year-old girlfriend died by suicide. Not long after her death, Alexakis attempted suicide by filling his pockets with sand and lead weights and jumping off the Santa Monica Pier. Later, he said that the vision and voice of his brother George compelled him to survive. Alexakis started shooting up when he was 13, mostly taking crystal methamphetamine. He became addicted to heroin and cocaine, and survived a cocaine overdose when he was 22. He quit drugs cold turkey in June 1989.

Alexakis attended Santa Monica High School and took film classes at Los Angeles Community College.

== Music career ==
=== Early bands ===
While living in Los Angeles in the 1980s, Alexakis was in a band called Shakin' Brave. Shakin' Brave featured a rather rough rock sound, but failed to emerge from the sea of music in Southern California. Alexakis and his first wife Anita relocated to San Francisco.

While living in San Francisco, Alexakis discovered a genre of music known as "cowpunk", a style merging two prevalent forms of music with which he grew up — the tunefulness of country and the distorted guitars/fast tempo of rock and roll. Inspired, Alexakis established Shindig Records. He spent several years with his cowpunk band, the Easy Hoes that formed in the late '80s and released one album, Tragic Songs of Life, in 1989.

Alexakis's next project began as a solo album but grew into a group project under the name Colorfinger. This band released the album, Deep in the Heart of the Beast in the Sun as well as an EP, Demonstration. Only the full-length album was made available for sale. Both were released on Alexakis's Shindig Records. A few songs originally performed by Colorfinger were made into Everclear songs, such as "Why I Don't Believe in God", "Invisible," "The Twistinside", "Heartspark Dollarsign", and "Hateful".

=== Everclear ===
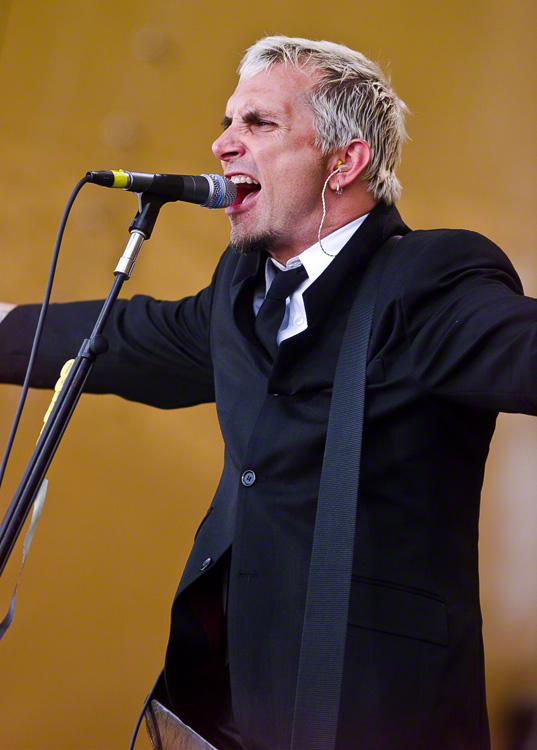
Alexakis singing with Everclear at Woodstock '99

Following a move to Portland, Alexakis placed an ad in The Rocket seeking a bass player and a drummer to form a new band. Alexakis had two respondents, Craig Montoya and Scott Cuthbert. The trio became the first incarnation of Everclear. After Cuthbert was replaced by Greg Eklund, the band spent the better part of a decade as a dominant act on alternative rock radio. The band scored three platinum albums in Sparkle & Fade, So Much for the Afterglow, and Songs from an American Movie Vol. One: Learning How to Smile.

The instability and personal turmoil Alexakis experienced throughout his life would directly inspire his lyrics. "Father of Mine" and "Why I Don't Believe in God" described his difficult youth, while "Heroin Girl", "Strawberry", and "Color Pit" touched upon his drug addictions. Everclear's breakthrough album, Sparkle & Fade, deals with the themes of escape and redemption that pervaded his life upon leaving San Francisco.

=== Songwriting and industry roles ===
While finding success as a musical act and songwriter, Alexakis took on other projects within the music industry. For several years, he served as an A&R representative for Capitol Records. In 1996, he produced Frogpond's album, Count to Ten.

In the early 2000s, Alexakis established his own label, Popularity Recordings, as a subsidiary of Artemis Records. He produced the label's first release, the 2002 album Volume by Flipp. The label closed in 2003.

Alexakis dabbled in songwriting with other artists, including co-writing and duetting the song "At the End of the Day" released on Marion Raven's 2005 and 2007 albums, Here I Am and Set Me Free, respectively.

In October 2008, Alexakis entered the studio with the Minneapolis-based band Apparently Nothing (previously a Madison band and later renamed to The Usual Things) to produce their debut album, tentatively titled The Middle Coast.

== Radio ==
From March 2017 through February 2019, Alexakis hosted a weekly radio show on SiriusXM's 1990s alternative and grunge music channel, Lithium (Channel 34).

== Film and television ==
In 2000, Alexakis made brief appearances in the Heather Graham comedy Committed. He played the lead role in the 2006 short film Room to Breathe and had parts in Rid of Me (2011) and Rogue River (2012).

Alexakis was interviewed on Space Ghost Coast to Coast; the interview never aired, although it is briefly glimpsed on Episode 60, "Lawsuit". In 2002, Alexakis appeared in two episodes of The Chris Isaak Show. In 2006, he appeared on an episode of Ned's Declassified School Survival Guide on Nickelodeon as a music teacher named Mr. Gibson (a reference to Gibson guitars).

In August 2006, Alexakis appeared on The O'Reilly Factor discussing the music video for "Hater", the first single from Everclear's Welcome to the Drama Club.

In 2014, he had a role as a tattoo artist in the biographical drama film Wild starring Reese Witherspoon.

== Political activism ==
In 2000, Alexakis testified before Congress in support of HR 1488, the Compassion for Children and Child Support Enforcement Act. Through ACES, the Association of Children for the Enforcement of Support, President Geraldine Jenson and Nancy Pelosi sponsored this bill. The law passed.

Alexakis was a delegate for the 2004 Democratic National Convention representing Oregon's 3rd congressional district after campaigning for John Edwards during that year's presidential primaries. He and Everclear recorded the Woody Guthrie standard "This Land Is Your Land", which he performed at several political events.

Alexakis is a gay rights activist. In 2010, he expressed his support for gay marriage and opposition to Proposition 8, "I don't think Prop 8, gay marriage or the things your community lobbies for are political issues. We are Americans; that's where it ends. If Lady Justice is supposed to be blind, then why not towards your community? It is going to happen; it's happening, and I think it is a great thing." In the same interview, he reflected on the gay rights movement in the 1970s by saying, "I went to San Francisco to see the Sex Pistols in 1978. I was barely 16 and I went with this neighbor of mine, who my mom didn't know was gay, but I knew was gay. I went to Castro with a whole group of gay guys and saw a side of the culture that I had never seen before. I was aware of Harvey Milk before most people were. It was a great experience."

Alexakis has also been involved in drug awareness programs, including the taping of public service announcements for the Office of National Drug Control Policy.

Along with Everclear, he has performed for U.S. soldiers in Guantanamo Bay, Cuba, Hawaii, and Abu Dhabi. He has also performed for Snowball Express, which organizes events for military families who lost loved ones in the war.

== Personal life ==
During his younger years, Alexakis was an atheist. In an August 2000 interview with Spin, Alexakis stated he had since become a Christian. Speaking about his then-fiancée Stephanie Greig, he said, "She's a Christian, and I'm a Christian—my ex isn't—and so I was like, it's okay to be a Christian. I'm not like a born-again... Well, I guess I am born-again, in a way. But I don't knock people over the head with it. I just kind of use my spirituality to make my life better."

Alexakis has been married four times: to a woman named Anita; to Jennifer Dodson Paget (with whom he has a daughter, Anna) from 1995 to 1999; to Stephanie Greig from 2000 to 2004; and to Vanessa Crawford since 2009 (with whom he has a daughter, Arizona).

On March 26, 2019, Alexakis announced that he had been diagnosed with multiple sclerosis in a letter to fans posted on the band's website. Alexakis says he was diagnosed with relapsing-remitting MS following a car crash three years prior.

== Partial discography ==
With The Easy Hoes:

- 1989 – Tragic Songs of Life

With Colorfinger:

- 1990 – Deep in the Heart of the Beast in the Sun
- 1990 – Demonstration

With Everclear:

- 1993 – World of Noise
- 1995 – Sparkle and Fade
- 1997 – So Much for the Afterglow
- 2000 – Songs from an American Movie Vol. One: Learning How to Smile
- 2000 – Songs from an American Movie Vol. Two: Good Time for a Bad Attitude
- 2003 – Slow Motion Daydream
- 2004 – Ten Years Gone: The Best of Everclear 1994-2004
- 2006 – Welcome to the Drama Club
- 2008 – The Vegas Years
- 2009 – In a Different Light
- 2012 – Invisible Stars
- 2015 – Black Is the New Black

Solo:

- 2019 – Sun Songs
