= Craig Montoya =

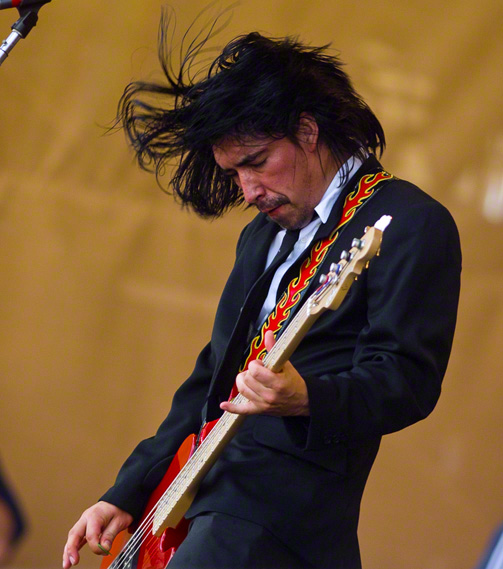
- Montoya performing with Everclear; July 22, 1999

Background information
- Born: Craig Aloysius Montoya; September 14, 1970 (age 56); Spokane, Washington, United States
- Genres: Alternative rock; post-grunge; power pop; grunge
- Occupations: Musician, songwriter
- Instruments: Bass; guitar; keyboards; vocals; mandolin
- Years active: 1992–present
- Label: Capitol

Craig Aloysius Montoya (born September 14, 1970) is an American musician. He is best known as the bassist of alternative rock band Everclear during the band's popularity in the late 1990s and early 2000s. He continued to perform with other small acts and tribute bands following his departure from Everclear in the mid-2000s.

== Early life ==
Montoya was born in Spokane, Washington, and wanted to play music from an early age. Though he was originally interested in the drums, a lack of bass guitarists in the area led him to switch instruments. Montoya bought his first bass guitar and amp when he was sixteen with money he earned mowing lawns. After graduating high school, Montoya joined a band named Soul Hammer and planned a move to Portland, Oregon, but was dropped from the band once their demo tape was finished. He then looked for a bass position in The Rocket, a Northwest newspaper, and found an ad from Art Alexakis, the former lead singer of Colorfinger. Alexakis united with him and drummer Scott Cuthbert, and together they founded Everclear. The trio recorded music and performed live and local shows. In 1993, they released World of Noise, which was recorded in a friend's basement studio.

In 1994, Everclear made several changes. Cuthbert was replaced by former Jollymon drummer Greg Eklund. The band also moved from Tim/Kerr Records to Capitol. In 1995, the new Everclear released their U.S. debut album, Sparkle and Fade with singles "Heroin Girl," "Heartspark Dollarsign," "You Make Me Feel Like a Whore," and "Santa Monica". The album found an audience on the alternative rock scene, as did their 1997 follow-up, So Much for the Afterglow.

During a 1998 Australian tour, Montoya got into a heated backstage argument with Alexakis after a fan threw a lit explosive on stage, and the tour was cut short. Montoya did not join the band for the ensuing tour of the United Kingdom, with David LoPrinzi filling in.

In August 2003, after three more albums, Montoya left Everclear. In 2004, Montoya formed a new band called Tri-Polar with Sweaty Nipples members Scotty Heard on guitar and Brian Lehfeldt on drums. The band began to record in late 2004, but weeks before its self-titled release on May 27, 2005, Heard left the band for personal reasons. Looking for a replacement, Montoya turned to Kevin Hahn of Red Sector, his bandmate from The Strain. Tri-Polar is still active and plays many cities along the West Coast, including the group members' hometown of Portland.

In 2006, Montoya helped form Castella with Hahn and frontman Ryan Andrew of Sidestar. They worked with producer Joe Chiccarelli to record How Did We Get Here during 2007. The record received praise from critics for its songwriting and production, and several songs from the record found their way onto TV series and movie soundtracks.

Craig is also currently playing bass for an Iron Maiden tribute band called Fear of the Dark which has current and past members from Black N' Blue, Vicious Rumors, The Loyal Order, Black Powder County, and Violent Majority.
