= Greg Eklund =

American musician/drummer

- Born: Greg Eklund; April 18, 1970 (age 55)
- Origin: Jacksonville, Florida, United States
- Genres: Rock; alternative rock; power pop; grunge
- Occupation: Musician
- Instruments: Drums; guitar; vocals; keyboards
- Labels: Stolen Transmission, Capitol Records
- Website: gregeklund.org

Greg Eklund (born April 18, 1970) is an American musician/drummer. Originally, he was the drummer for Jolly Mon and quit the band after the release of their debut album. He then joined the rock band Everclear as their drummer from 1994 to 2003, the Oohlas from 2004 to 2008, and Storm Large and Le Bonheur 2009–present.

Eklund attended high school at Lake Braddock Secondary School in Burke, Virginia, graduating in 1988. There he played drums with several bands including the Blonde Mexicans, Tension, and Red October (with Tom Goodin, future guitarist and founding member of the Pietasters on guitar).

After leaving the band, Jolly Mon, he replaced the original Everclear drummer Scott Cuthbert in 1994. With Everclear, Eklund wrote and sang "The Honeymoon Song" on the album Songs from an American Movie Vol. One: Learning How to Smile.

Eklund is currently the drummer for Storm Large and Le Bonheur who tours both nationally and internationally. He has been married to artist Ellina Kevorkian since 1997. They have two children.

He released his first album on August 1, 2021. Muffled Tears has 13 tracks and is available on streaming apps.
