= 2004 in music =

This is a list of notable events in music that took place in the year 2004.

== Specific locations ==
- 2004 in British music
- 2004 in Irish music
- 2004 in Norwegian music
- 2004 in Scandinavian music
- 2004 in South Korean music

== Specific genres ==
- 2004 in classical music
- 2004 in country music
- 2004 in heavy metal music
- 2004 in hip-hop
- 2004 in jazz
- 2004 in Latin music
- 2004 in progressive rock

== Events ==
=== January–February ===
- January 1
  - The Vienna New Year's Concert is conducted by Riccardo Muti.
  - Kurt Nilsen wins World Idol.
- January 3 – Britney Spears marries Jason Allen Alexander, a childhood friend, in Las Vegas. The marriage is annulled 55 hours later.
- January 15 – Rapper Mystikal is sentenced to six years in prison for sexual battery.
- January 16–February 1 – The Big Day Out festival takes place in Australia and New Zealand, headlined by Metallica. A Perfect Circle is originally named in the lineup but later withdraw, with Fear Factory appearing as a mystery artist in place of all of A Perfect Circle's scheduled slots.
- February 1
  - Janet Jackson and Justin Timberlake perform onstage at Super Bowl XXXVIII. The performance concludes with Jackson's right breast being exposed to the audience. The phrase "wardrobe malfunction" is coined during the ensuing controversy.
  - Daron Hagen is appointed President of the Lotte Lehmann Foundation in New York City.
- February 8 – The 46th Annual Grammy Awards are held at the Staples Center in Los Angeles, California. Outkast's Speakerboxxx/The Love Below becomes the first rap album to win Album of the Year. Beyoncé wins five awards. Coldplay's "Clocks" wins Record of the Year, while Luther Vandross' "Dance with My Father" wins Song of the Year. Evanescence win Best New Artist.
- February 9 – Blink-182 release single "I Miss You" from the album Blink-182. The song will reach number one on the Billboard Modern Rock chart.
- February 10 – Paulina Rubio releases her seventh studio "Pau-Latina" under Universal Music Mexico. The album charted at #1 on the Billboard Latin Pop Albums and at #105 on the Billboard 200. The album also got certified 2× Platinum (Latin) by the RIAA.
- February 13 – Elton John begins The Red Piano concert residency at The Colosseum at Caesars Palace in Las Vegas. Originally scheduled for 75 performances, it would run for 248 shows over five years, including twenty-four tour dates in Europe.
- February 17
  - BRIT Awards are held in London. The Darkness, Dido, Busted, Justin Timberlake and KRS-One are among the winners.
  - Smashing Pumpkins frontman Billy Corgan posts a bitter message on his personal blog calling D'arcy Wretzky a "mean spirited drug addict" and blaming James Iha for the breakup of the band.

=== March–April ===
- March 2 – Britney Spears embarks on The Onyx Hotel Tour, her first tour in 2 years, to support her fourth studio album, In The Zone.
- March 9 – Westlife member Brian McFadden leaves the band.
- March 10 – George Michael announces that Patience will be his last commercially released record. Future releases will be available from his web site in return for donations to his favourite charities.
- March 13 – Luciano Pavarotti gives his last performance in an opera, in Tosca at the New York Metropolitan Opera.
- March 23 – Usher releases his Confessions album selling 1.1 million copies its first week, making him the first R&B artist to ever accomplish that. The album would be the top seller of the year with four number one singles.
- April 6 – A previously unreleased Johnny Cash album called My Mother's Hymn Book is released less than a year after his death on September 12, 2003.
- April 20 – Fear Factory returns after their 2002 breakup with the new album Archetype.
- April 26
  - Deborah Voigt, sacked by Covent Garden for being too fat for an opera role, makes her recital debut to a rapturous reception at Carnegie Hall.
  - Dream Theater performs at the Nippon Budokan Hall in Tokyo, Japan.

=== May–June ===
- May 1-2 – The annual Coachella Valley Music and Arts Festival takes place in California. Headlined by Radiohead and The Cure, the lineup also features Pixies, The Flaming Lips, Belle and Sebastian, Muse, MF Doom, Basement Jaxx, Death Cab for Cutie, Black Rebel Motorcycle Club, Kraftwerk and Kool Keith.
- May 10
  - Blender magazine's May issue includes a "50 Worst Songs Ever!" list. "We Built This City," by Starship, is rated worst.
  - Peter Tägtgren replaces Mikael Åkerfeldt In Bloodbath.
  - Keane release Hopes and Fears which becomes the 16th best selling album of the millennium in the UK. It went 8× platinum and was nominated for the Mercury Prize and the BRIT award for best album.
- May 12–15 – The 49th Eurovision Song Contest, held at Abdi İpekçi Arena in Istanbul, Turkey, is won by Ukrainian singer Ruslana with the song "Wild Dances". It is the first contest to take place as a multi-date event.
- May 18-23 – The European Festival of Youth Choirs (EJCF) is held in Basel.
- May 24 – Madonna starts The Re-Invention Tour in 20 cities with a total of 56 shows and making it the most successful concert tour of the year with a gross of $124.5 million.
- May 25
  - Phish announces that after 21 years they will break up following the Summer 2004 Tour.
  - Skinny Puppy releases their first studio album since disbanding in 1996, called The Greater Wrong of the Right.
- May 26 – Fantasia Barrino wins the third season of American Idol, defeating Diana DeGarmo.
- May 28 – June 6 – The Rock in Rio concert festival is staged in Lisbon, Portugal, under the name Rock in Rio Lisboa. Paul McCartney, Peter Gabriel, Foo Fighters, Metallica, Britney Spears and Sting each headline one of the six days.
- June 4
  - Karl Jenkins signs a 10-year recording deal with EMI.
  - Creed dissolved. Guitarist Mark Tremonti, Drummer Scott Phillips and Brian Marshall (ex Bassist of Creed) were working on side project Alter Bridge along with Myles Kennedy of The Mayfield Four. Their first album is One Day Remains, which was scheduled to be released on August 10.
- June 5-6 – The annual Download Festival takes place at Donington Park in Leicestershire, England, with Linkin Park and Metallica headlining the main stage. Pennywise and HIM headline the Snickers "Game On" stage, while the Barfly stage is headlined by Peaches and SuicideGirls.
- June 11 – The Van Halen Summer Tour 2004 kicks off in Greensboro, North Carolina, marking the return of Sammy Hagar on vocals for the first time since his acrimonious departure from the band in 1996.
- June 12 – The Los Angeles, California radio station KROQ-FM airs the 12th Annual KROQ Weenie Roast show with Bad Religion, Beastie Boys, Cypress Hill, The Hives, Hoobastank, The Killers, Modest Mouse, New Found Glory, Story of the Year, The Strokes, Velvet Revolver, Yeah Yeah Yeahs and Yellowcard.
- June 22 – 14th annual Lollapalooza festival, scheduled for July 17, is cancelled. Organizers cite "poor ticket sales". (See: Lollapalooza 2004 lineup.)
- June 23 – UK DJ Tony Blackburn is suspended by radio station Classic Gold Digital for playing songs by Cliff Richard, against station policy.
- June 25
  - Eric Clapton sells his famous guitar "Blackie" at a Christie's auction, raising $959,000 to benefit the Crossroads drug rehabilitation center that he founded in 1998.
  - While in Scheeßel, Germany for his A Reality tour, David Bowie suffers a heart attack onstage and is subsequently rushed to the emergency room for an angioplasty. The incident brings an abrupt end to the tour and prompts Bowie to move away from both musicianship and public life in the following years, with his next album coming out nearly nine years later.

=== July–August ===
- July 10
  - Ex-S Club star Rachel Stevens sets a world record for completing the fastest promotional circuit in just 24 hours- including a run for the charity Sport Relief.
  - American Idol winner Fantasia becomes the first artist in history to debut at number-one on the Hot 100 with a first record.
- July 11 – McFly debut at #1 on the UK album charts with Room On The 3rd Floor. They break the record set by The Beatles as the youngest group ever to debut at #1 on the album charts.
- July 20 – Van Halen releases The Best of Both Worlds, a 36-song compilation album featuring three new recordings with Sammy Hagar on vocals.
- July 24 – The Robert Smith organized Curiosa Festival kicks off with a concert in West Palm Beach, Florida. Performing along with The Cure are Interpol, The Rapture, Mogwai, Cursive, Muse, Head Automatica, Thursday, Scarling., The Cooper Temple Clause, and Melissa Auf der Maur.
- July 24–25 – The Splendour in the Grass music festival is held in Byron Bay, Australia, headlined by PJ Harvey & Jurassic 5.
- July 25 – The Doobie Brothers record and perform Live at Wolf Trap at Wolf Trap National Park for the Performing Arts in Vienna, Virginia. The live album was released two months later, on October 26.
- July 31
  - Simon & Garfunkel perform a free concert in front of the Colosseum in Rome for an audience of 600,000 people.
  - Dispatch performs their last live show at the DCR Hatchshell in Boston, Massachusetts.
- August 8 – Dave Matthews Band's tour bus dumps 800 lb (360 kg) of human waste from a Chicago bridge, intending to unload it in the river, but it lands on an architecture tour boat. The bus driver and the band are sued by the state of Illinois.
- August 15 – Phish performs their final concert at a two-day festival in Coventry, Vermont.
- August 23 – The Prodigy release their much anticipated and postponed first full-length album Always Outnumbered Never Outgunned, 7 years after 1997's The Fat Of The Land.

=== September–October ===
- September 18 – Britney Spears marries Kevin Federline.
- September 20 – Green Day release their seventh studio album American Idiot, making a comeback for the band, following disappointing sales of their 2000 album Warning. American Idiot eventually receives the award for Best Rock Album at the 47th Grammy Awards on February 13, 2005.
- September 21 – Gloria Trevi is acquitted and released from jail after being cleared of the charges related to Sergio Andrade's sex-crimes.
- September 26 – Avril Lavigne begins her Bonez Tour.
- September 28
  - Brian Wilson releases Brian Wilson Presents Smile, the first official interpretation of the Smile sessions since their shelving in 1967.
  - On the same day, young Filipino singer Christian Bautista unveiled his first self-titled debut album.
- October – Jazz at Lincoln Center performance venue opens in New York City.
- October 2 – Billy Joel marries for the third time, to the food critic and chef Katie Lee.
- October 11 – Melissa Etheridge undergoes surgery for breast cancer.
- October 23 – Ashlee Simpson is accused of lip synching after an abortive live performance on the television show Saturday Night Live.
- October 25 – Indian singer Hariharan is awarded the Swaralaya Kairali Yesudas Award for his outstanding contribution to Indian film music.

=== November–December ===
- November 4 – Three members of the band RAM, who all lived in a neighborhood known for its support of the recently deposed former President Jean-Bertrand Aristide, are detained by Haitian police during a concert performance in Port-au-Prince; no charges are ever filed or official explanation for the detentions given.
- November 9 – Britney Spears releases her first compilation album titled Greatest Hits: My Prerogative.
- November 11 – Eric Clapton receives a CBE at Buckingham Palace.
- November 12 – Eminem's fourth major studio album, Encore is released four days before schedule to combat Internet bootleggers. The album sells 710,000 copies in only three days and becomes Eminem's third consecutive album to debut at #1 on the Billboard charts.
- November 17 – Within Temptation release the single "Stand My Ground".
- November 21 – Casey Donovan is crowned winner of the second season of Australian Idol. Anthony Callea was named runner-up.
- November 24 – Brian & Eric Hoffman leave Deicide after a royalties dispute.
- November 30 – Jay-Z and Linkin Park's album Collision Course debuts atop Billboard 200, later becoming the best-selling CD/DVD of that year.
- December 8 – Dimebag Darrell is murdered on stage while performing in Columbus, Ohio, by a deranged fan, who shoots the guitarist three times in the head with a 9mm Beretta handgun. The gunman kills three other people and wounds a further three before being shot dead by police.
- December 11 – Steve Brookstein is crowned winner of the first series of The X Factor. G4 are named the runner-ups, while Tabby Callaghan and Rowetta Satchell finish in third and fourth place respectively.
- December 11–12 – The Los Angeles, California radio station KROQ-FM airs the 15th Annual of the Acoustic Christmas with Chevelle, Franz Ferdinand, Good Charlotte, Green Day, Hoobastank, Incubus, Interpol, Jimmy Eat World, Keane, The Killers, Modest Mouse, Muse, The Music, My Chemical Romance, Papa Roach, Snow Patrol, Social Distortion, Sum 41, Taking Back Sunday, The Shins, The Used, and Velvet Revolver.
- December 14 – Clint Lowery leaves Sevendust due to fights with band about gaining control of the band and doubts of the band's future after being released from their label TVT Records.

== Bands formed ==
See Musical groups established in 2004

== Bands on hiatus ==
- Spineshank (reformed in 2008)
- Timo Rautiainen & Trio Niskalaukaus (disbanded in 2006)
- Matchbox Twenty (reformed in 2007)

== Bands disbanded ==
See Musical groups disestablished in 2004

== Bands re-formed ==
- Destiny's Child
- Helmet
- Megadeth
- New York Dolls
- Restless Heart
- The Shadows (till 2015)
- Vaya Con Dios

== Albums released ==
=== January–March ===
Date		Album	Artist	Notes
J A N U A R Y	1	Alea Jacta Est	WarCry	-
J A N U A R Y	1	Not Quite Me	Tess Wiley	-
J A N U A R Y	1	Ulrichsberg	Irène Schweizer and Pierre Favre	-
J A N U A R Y	4	Explosives and the Will to Use Them	Crime In Stereo	-
J A N U A R Y	6	As the Roots Undo	Circle Takes the Square	-
J A N U A R Y	6	Born Free	Humble Gods	-
J A N U A R Y	6	Phantom Planet	Phantom Planet	-
J A N U A R Y	7	Terror	Loudness	-
J A N U A R Y	12	The Glorious Burden	Iced Earth	-
J A N U A R Y	13	Legion of Boom	The Crystal Method	-
J A N U A R Y	13	The Opera Band	Amici Forever	-
J A N U A R Y	13	A War Story Book II	Psycho Realm	-
J A N U A R Y	15	Love & Honesty	BoA	-
J A N U A R Y	15	The Weak's End	Emery	-
J A N U A R Y	17	Because I Can	Katy Rose	-
J A N U A R Y	19	Colour The Small One	Sia	-
J A N U A R Y	20	Bravebird	Amel Larrieux	-
J A N U A R Y	20	Civilization	Front Line Assembly	-
J A N U A R Y	20	The Devil Isn't Red	Hella	-
J A N U A R Y	20	The Early Chapters	Soilwork	EP
J A N U A R Y	20	Educated Guess	Ani DiFranco	-
J A N U A R Y	20	Hang On Mike	Candy Butchers	-
J A N U A R Y	20	Heron King Blues	Califone	-
J A N U A R Y	20	Slon	Chicago Underground Trio	-
J A N U A R Y	20	Songs We Should Have Written	Firewater	-
J A N U A R Y	20	The Willowz	The Willowz	-
J A N U A R Y	21	Talkie Walkie	Air	US
J A N U A R Y	26	Sleepy Buildings – A Semi Acoustic Evening	The Gathering	-
J A N U A R Y	26	Do You Know	Michelle Williams	-
J A N U A R Y	26	Immortal Memory	Lisa Gerrard and Patrick Cassidy	-
J A N U A R Y	26	Nightfreak and the Sons of Becker	The Coral	-
J A N U A R Y	27	Bangers Vs. Fuckers	Coachwhips	
J A N U A R Y	27	Campfire Songs: The Popular, Obscure and Unknown Recordings of 10,000 Maniacs	10,000 Maniacs	Compilation
J A N U A R Y	27	Delìrium Còrdia	Fantômas	-
J A N U A R Y	27	Diva: Platinum Edition	Ivy Queen	Re-release
J A N U A R Y	27	Hypnotic Underworld	Ghost	-
J A N U A R Y	27	Join the Dots: B-Sides & Rarities 1978–2001	The Cure	Box Set
J A N U A R Y	27	Kamikaze	Twista	-
J A N U A R Y	27	Live at the Deaf Club	Dead Kennedys	Live
J A N U A R Y	27	Live at the House of Blues	The Vandals	Live
J A N U A R Y	27	Love Songs	Michael Franks	Compilation
J A N U A R Y	27	Map of What Is Effortless	Telefon Tel Aviv	-
J A N U A R Y	27	Margerine Eclipse	Stereolab	-
J A N U A R Y	27	Mojo Box	Southern Culture on the Skids	-
J A N U A R Y	27	One Moment More	Mindy Smith	-
J A N U A R Y	27	Ripp tha Game Bloody: Street Muzic	RBX	-
J A N U A R Y	27	Sirens and Condolences	Bayside	-
J A N U A R Y	27	Unsung: The Best of Helmet (1991–1997)	Helmet	Compilation
J A N U A R Y	27	The Ultimate Yes: 35th Anniversary Collection	Yes	US; Box Set
J A N U A R Y	28	Tomatteita Tokei ga Ima Ugokidashita	Zard	-
J A N U A R Y	31	Politics	Sébastien Tellier	-
F E B R U A R Y	2	Bows + Arrows	The Walkmen	-
F E B R U A R Y	2	Evolution Purgatory	Persuader	-
F E B R U A R Y	2	Scissor Sisters	Scissor Sisters	UK
F E B R U A R Y	3	50 First Dates: Love Songs from the Original Motion Picture	Various Artists	Soundtrack
F E B R U A R Y	3	The Battle for Everything	Five for Fighting	-
F E B R U A R Y	3	Critical Energy	Threshold	-
F E B R U A R Y	3	A Crow Left of the Murder	Incubus	-
F E B R U A R Y	3	Start Something	Lostprophets	-
F E B R U A R Y	3	Upsettin' Ernesto's	The Slackers	Live
F E B R U A R Y	3	We Shall All Be Healed	The Mountain Goats	-
F E B R U A R Y	3	When the Sun Goes Down	Kenny Chesney	-
F E B R U A R Y	6	The Sunday Best	This Providence	EP; re-release
F E B R U A R Y	9	Franz Ferdinand	Franz Ferdinand	Debut Album
F E B R U A R Y	9	Free Me	Emma Bunton	UK
F E B R U A R Y	9	Marshall's House	John Squire	-
F E B R U A R Y	9	The Raging Fire	Seventh Key	-
F E B R U A R Y	9	That's What I'm Talking About	Shannon Noll	-
F E B R U A R Y	10	America's Sweetheart	Courtney Love	-
F E B R U A R Y	10	Body Language	Kylie Minogue	US
F E B R U A R Y	10	The College Dropout	Kanye West	-
F E B R U A R Y	10	Bulería	David Bisbal	-
F E B R U A R Y	10	Feels Like Home	Norah Jones	-
F E B R U A R Y	10	Get Away From Me	Nellie McKay	-
F E B R U A R Y	10	Gold: 35th Anniversary Edition	Carpenters	Compilation
F E B R U A R Y	10	Greatest Hits	Thalía	Compilation
F E B R U A R Y	10	Hell and Back	Drag-On	-
F E B R U A R Y	10	Keep It Simple	Keb' Mo'	-
F E B R U A R Y	10	Lucky	Melissa Etheridge	-
F E B R U A R Y	10	'Merican	The Descendents	EP
F E B R U A R Y	10	Miles Gurtu	Robert Miles & Trilok Gurtu	-
F E B R U A R Y	10	New Found Power	Damageplan	Debut (The first and last album)
F E B R U A R Y	10	Pau-Latina	Paulina Rubio	-
F E B R U A R Y	10	Probot	Probot	-
F E B R U A R Y	10	Shamrocks & Shenanigans	House of Pain & Everlast	Compilation
F E B R U A R Y	10	Turn of the Screw	1208	-
F E B R U A R Y	16	The Focusing Blur	Vintersorg	-
F E B R U A R Y	16	Late Night Tales: Turin Brakes	Turin Brakes	Compilation
F E B R U A R Y	16	Norfolk Coast	The Stranglers	-
F E B R U A R Y	16	The Runaway Found	The Veils	Debut
F E B R U A R Y	17	All That We Let In	Indigo Girls	-
F E B R U A R Y	17	Fabulous Muscles	Xiu Xiu	-
F E B R U A R Y	17	I Don't Want You Back	Eamon	-
F E B R U A R Y	17	Laced with Romance	The Ponys	Debut
F E B R U A R Y	17	Nick's Bump	Ben Sidran	-
F E B R U A R Y	17	On The Front Line	The Casualties	-
F E B R U A R Y	17	She's in Control	Chromeo	-
F E B R U A R Y	17	Writer's Block	Evergreen Terrace	-
F E B R U A R Y	23	The Dark Horse Years 1976–1992	George Harrison	Box Set
F E B R U A R Y	23	Samotność po zmierzchu	Ania	-
F E B R U A R Y	23	Scars of the Crucifix	Deicide	-
F E B R U A R Y	24	About a Burning Fire	Blindside	-
F E B R U A R Y	24	Anything Goes	Brad Mehldau	-
F E B R U A R Y	24	The Arrival	Hypocrisy	-
F E B R U A R Y	24	Bodysong	Jonny Greenwood	US; Soundtrack
F E B R U A R Y	24	Chick Magnet	Paul Wall	-
F E B R U A R Y	24	Death Is Certain	Royce Da 5'9"	-
F E B R U A R Y	24	Devil's Ground	Primal Fear	-
F E B R U A R Y	24	The Hard Way	Owsley	-
F E B R U A R Y	24	Kidz Bop 5	Kidz Bop Kids	-
F E B R U A R Y	24	The King of Crunk & BME Recordings Present: Trillville & Lil Scrappy	Trillville and Lil Scrappy	-
F E B R U A R Y	24	The Life of Joseph W. McVey	Z-Ro	-
F E B R U A R Y	24	Music as a Weapon II	Disturbed, Chevelle, Taproot & Ünloco	Live
F E B R U A R Y	24	Nude	VAST	-
F E B R U A R Y	24	Punk Statik Paranoia	Orgy	-
F E B R U A R Y	24	Schizophrenic	JC Chasez	-
F E B R U A R Y	24	Sea of Faces	Kutless	-
F E B R U A R Y	24	Shadows Collide with People	John Frusciante	-
F E B R U A R Y	24	Van Hunt	Van Hunt	Debut
F E B R U A R Y	24	Virginia Creeper	Grant-Lee Phillips	-
F E B R U A R Y	24	They Were Wrong, So We Drowned	Liars	-
F E B R U A R Y	24	The Wretched Spawn	Cannibal Corpse	-
F E B R U A R Y	25	Answer	Supercar	-
F E B R U A R Y	26	The Blue Notebooks	Max Richter	-
F E B R U A R Y	29	Schmack!	Steriogram	-
M A R C H	1	Mellow	Maria Mena	-
M A R C H	1	When It Falls	Zero 7	-
M A R C H	2	The Best of LeAnn Rimes	LeAnn Rimes	Compilation
M A R C H	2	Cee-Lo Green... Is the Soul Machine	Cee-Lo Green	-
M A R C H	2	Guilt Show	The Get Up Kids	-
M A R C H	2	The Kinnitty Sessions	Lunasa	Live
M A R C H	2	Modern ARTillery	The Living End	US
M A R C H	2	What's Wrong with Bill?	Ill Bill	Debut
M A R C H	3	Message	Aya Ueto	-
M A R C H	4	The Tain	The Decemberists	EP
M A R C H	8	667.. The Neighbour of the Beast	Wig Wam	-
M A R C H	8	The Cribs	The Cribs	-
M A R C H	8	My Religion	TNT	-
M A R C H	8	Suburban Rock 'N' Roll	Space	-
M A R C H	8	Sunrise Over Sea	The John Butler Trio	-
M A R C H	8	Ultravisitor	Squarepusher	-
M A R C H	8	Your Blues	Destroyer	-
M A R C H	9	All of Our Names	Sarah Harmer	-
M A R C H	9	Black & White	The Samples	-
M A R C H	9	Desperate Youth, Blood Thirsty Babes	TV on the Radio	-
M A R C H	9	Don't Stop the Music	Play	-
M A R C H	9	Fall Back Open	Now It's Overhead	-
M A R C H	9	Give	The Bad Plus	-
M A R C H	9	Here Come the Brides	Brides of Destruction	-
M A R C H	9	High Water	El-P featuring the Blue Series Continuum	-
M A R C H	9	Into the Now	Tesla	-
M A R C H	9	La maison de mon rêve	CocoRosie	Debut
M A R C H	9	Milk Man	Deerhoof	-
M A R C H	9	The Moon & Antarctica	Modest Mouse	Re-issue
M A R C H	9	The Negation	Decapitated	-
M A R C H	9	Neither Here Nor There	Melvins	Compilation
M A R C H	9	Pawn Shoppe Heart	The Von Bondies	-
M A R C H	9	Rare Tracks	Jet	Japan
M A R C H	9	Something Beautiful*	Great Big Sea	US
M A R C H	9	Tempo of the Damned	Exodus	-
M A R C H	9	Two Way Monologue	Sondre Lerche	-
M A R C H	9	Young Man	Jack Ingram	-
M A R C H	9	Your Country	Graham Parker	-
M A R C H	12	Hella/Four Tet Split	Hella/Four Tet	Split EP
M A R C H	15	And Love Said No: The Greatest Hits 1997–2004	HIM	Compilation
M A R C H	15	From Ohio with Love	A Day in the Life/Hit the Lights/The Red Affair	3-way Split
M A R C H	15	Live and Demos	Raging Speedhorn	Compilation
M A R C H	15	Misery Is a Butterfly	Blonde Redhead	-
M A R C H	16	Afterlife	Joe Jackson	Live
M A R C H	16	Almost Killed Me	The Hold Steady	Debut
M A R C H	16	Dead Letters	The Rasmus	US
M A R C H	16	Frustration Plantation	Rasputina	-
M A R C H	16	Grown Backwards	David Byrne	-
M A R C H	16	The Other Side	Godsmack	EP
M A R C H	16	Patience	George Michael	-
M A R C H	16	Seven Swans	Sufjan Stevens	-
M A R C H	16	A Snow Capped Romance	36 Crazyfists	
M A R C H	16	Split Personality	Cassidy	-
M A R C H	16	UGodz-Illa Presents: The Hillside Scramblers	The Hillside Scramblers	Debut
M A R C H	16	The Very Best of Jackson Browne	Jackson Browne	Compilation
M A R C H	16	You Are Here	UFO	-
M A R C H	23	All of Our Names	Sarah Harmer	-
M A R C H	23	Back Together Again	Fred Anderson and Hamid Drake	-
M A R C H	23	Blast Tyrant	Clutch	-
M A R C H	23	Confessions	Usher	-
M A R C H	23	Cool to Be You	The Descendents	-
M A R C H	23	E&A	Eyedea & Abilities	-
M A R C H	23	Finally Woken	Jem	-
M A R C H	23	Fly or Die	N.E.R.D.	-
M A R C H	23	Good Side, Bad Side	Master P	-
M A R C H	23	Greatest Hits	Guns N' Roses	Compilation
M A R C H	23	Hip to the Javabean	Lemon Demon	-
M A R C H	23	It's Never Enough	Ace Troubleshooter	-
M A R C H	23	Let's Talk About It	Carl Thomas	-
M A R C H	23	Live at the House of Blues	Goldfinger	Live
M A R C H	23	LP	Ambulance LTD	US
M A R C H	23	Madvillainy	Madvillain	-
M A R C H	23	Me and Mr. Johnson	Eric Clapton	Robert Johnson tribute album
M A R C H	23	The Milk-Eyed Mender	Joanna Newsom	Debut
M A R C H	23	MP3	Marcy Playground	-
M A R C H	23	Murs 3:16: The 9th Edition	Murs and 9th Wonder	-
M A R C H	23	Night of Joy	Widespread Panic	Live
M A R C H	23	Now That's What I Call Music! 15 (U.S. series)	Various Artists	Compilation
M A R C H	23	One Way Out	The Allman Brothers Band	Live
M A R C H	23	Our Endless Numbered Days	Iron & Wine	-
M A R C H	23	Peace, Love, Death Metal	The Eagles of Death Metal	Debut
M A R C H	23	The Punisher: The Album	Various Artists	Soundtrack
M A R C H	23	Redefine	Soil	-
M A R C H	23	Scooby-Doo 2: Monsters Unleashed: The Album	Various Artists	Soundtrack
M A R C H	23	Sings Greatest Palace Music	Bonnie "Prince" Billy	-
M A R C H	23	Till Death Do Us Part	Cypress Hill	-
M A R C H	23	Tour 2003	Ringo Starr & His All-Starr Band	Live
M A R C H	23	Venice	Fennesz	-
M A R C H	23	The Way I Am	Knoc-turn'al	-
M A R C H	23	Winning Days	The Vines	-
M A R C H	24	Ba Ba Ti Ki Di Do	Sigur Rós	EP
M A R C H	24	Bee Hives	Broken Social Scene	-
M A R C H	24	COM LAG (2plus2isfive)	Radiohead	EP
M A R C H	24	The Frustrated	Glay	-
M A R C H	29	Absent Friends	The Divine Comedy	-
M A R C H	29	Alphabetical	Phoenix	-
M A R C H	29	Anastacia	Anastacia	-
M A R C H	29	The Chocolate Invasion	Prince	-
M A R C H	29	The Slaughterhouse	Prince	-
M A R C H	29	Musicology	Prince	-
M A R C H	29	Smack Smash	Beatsteaks	-
M A R C H	29	Soundtrack to Your Escape	In Flames	-
M A R C H	30	The Bootleg Series Vol. 6: Bob Dylan Live 1964, Concert at Philharmonic Hall	Bob Dylan	Live
M A R C H	30	Classics: Vol 1	Big Moe	Compilation
M A R C H	30	Damita Jo	Janet Jackson	US
M A R C H	30	Honkin' on Bobo	Aerosmith	Covers album
M A R C H	30	In With the Old	Pepper	-
M A R C H	30	Live & Off the Record	Shakira	Live LP & DVD
M A R C H	30	Los Lonely Boys	Los Lonely Boys	-
M A R C H	30	Population Override	Buckethead	-
M A R C H	30	Prophecy	Soulfly	-
M A R C H	30	RBG: Revolutionary but Gangsta	Dead Prez	-
M A R C H	30	Then and Now	The Who	Compilation +2 new tracks
M A R C H	30	U Gotta Feel Me	Lil' Flip	-
31	Smile	L'Arc-en-Ciel	-	

=== April–June ===
Date		Album	Artist	Notes
A P R I L	4	Indestructible Object	They Might Be Giants	EP
A P R I L	5	Best of Both Worlds	Midnight Oil	DVD
A P R I L	5	The Dissociatives	The Dissociatives	-
A P R I L	5	Faking the Books	Lali Puna	-
A P R I L	5	Greatest Hits	Atomic Kitten	Compilation
A P R I L	5	J Wess Presents Tha LP	J-Wess	LP
A P R I L	6	2 Nights Live!	Barry Manilow	Live
A P R I L	6	22nd Century Lifestyle	pre)Thing	-
A P R I L	6	Convict Pool	Calexico	EP
A P R I L	6	Creative Differences	Living Legends	-
A P R I L	6	Good News for People Who Love Bad News	Modest Mouse	-
A P R I L	6	Hellfire Club	Edguy	-
A P R I L	6	Hood Hop	J-Kwon	-
A P R I L	6	Just Be	Tiësto	-
A P R I L	6	Inspiration	William Hung	-
A P R I L	6	It's All Around You	Tortoise	-
A P R I L	6	Liars	Todd Rundgren	-
A P R I L	6	Ludo	Ludo	-
A P R I L	6	Matters	Pulley	-
A P R I L	6	More	Tamia	-
A P R I L	6	The Neon God: Part 1 – The Rise	W.A.S.P.	-
A P R I L	6	On My Way	Ben Kweller	-
A P R I L	6	Retriever	Ron Sexsmith	-
A P R I L	6	Satanic Panic in the Attic	of Montreal	-
A P R I L	6	Seis De Mayo	Trey Anastasio	-
A P R I L	6	South of Sideways	Edgewater	-
A P R I L	6	This Is Who You Are	The Beautiful Mistake	-
A P R I L	6	True Love	Toots & the Maytals	-
A P R I L	6	My Mother's Hymn Book	Johnny Cash	-
A P R I L	6	Whatever Happened to P.J. Soles?	Local H	-
A P R I L	10	Exhivision	Exhivision	-
A P R I L	12	Prasasti Seni	(Malaysia) Siti Nurhaliza	-
A P R I L	13	Baron von Bullshit Rides Again	Modest Mouse	Live
A P R I L	13	Crossfade	Crossfade	-
A P R I L	13	The Duel	Allison Moorer	-
A P R I L	13	Is There Love in Space?	Joe Satriani	-
A P R I L	13	Kill Bill Vol. 2 Original Soundtrack	various	-
A P R I L	13	Palm Trees and Power Lines	Sugarcult	-
A P R I L	14	Walking Cloud and Deep Red Sky, Flag Fluttered and the Sun Shined	Mono	-
A P R I L	18	Cosmic Cleavage	Busdriver	-
A P R I L	19	DJ-Kicks: Erlend Øye	Erlend Øye	-
A P R I L	20	Afroholic... The Even Better Times	Afroman	2xCD
A P R I L	20	Archetype	Fear Factory	-
A P R I L	20	The Blue Jukebox	Chris Rea	-
A P R I L	20	BYO Split Series, Vol. 5	Alkaline Trio/One Man Army	Split LP
A P R I L	20	The Cuckoo Clocks of Hell	Buckethead	-
A P R I L	20	Desensitized	Drowning Pool	-
A P R I L	20	Fire It Up	The Kottonmouth Kings	-
A P R I L	20	Franz Ferdinand	Franz Ferdinand	-
A P R I L	20	Funeral for a Friend / Moments in Grace	Funeral for a Friend / Moments in Grace	Split EP
A P R I L	20	Hangover Music Vol. VI	Black Label Society	-
A P R I L	20	Highwire Act Live in St. Louis 2003	Little Feat	Live
A P R I L	20	Hurt No More	Mario Winans	-
A P R I L	20	I'd Like a Virgin	Richard Cheese and Lounge Against the Machine	-
A P R I L	20	Impossible Dream	Patty Griffin	-
A P R I L	20	Inches	Les Savy Fav	Compilation
A P R I L	20	Letters from Home	John Michael Montgomery	-
A P R I L	20	Music of Mass Destruction	Anthrax	Live
A P R I L	20	Mute Print	A Wilhelm Scream	-
A P R I L	20	The Pretty Toney Album	Ghostface Killah	-
A P R I L	20	Ratatat	Ratatat	-
A P R I L	20	Rock Against Bush, Vol. 1	Various Artists, Rock Against Bush	Compilation
A P R I L	20	Stevie	Yesterdays New Quintet	-
A P R I L	20	Stone Age Complication	Queens of the Stone Age	EP
A P R I L	20	Sunsets and Car Crashes	The Spill Canvas	-
A P R I L	20	Through the Ashes of Empires	Machine Head	US
A P R I L	20	2 a.m. Wakeup Call	Tweaker	-
A P R I L	20	Underneath	Hanson	-
A P R I L	26	The Beta Band	Heroes to Zeros	-
A P R I L	26	As Far as I Can See...	The Zombies	-
A P R I L	26	Walk The Tightrope	Human Nature	-
A P R I L	27	A Boot and a Shoe	Sam Phillips	-
A P R I L	27	American Idol Season 3: Greatest Soul Classics	Various Artists	-
A P R I L	27	Between Here and Gone	Mary Chapin Carpenter	-
A P R I L	27	Black Box: The Complete Original Black Sabbath 1970–1978	Black Sabbath	Box Set
A P R I L	27	D12 World	D12	-
A P R I L	27	The Dresden Dolls	The Dresden Dolls	Re-issue
A P R I L	27	Escondida	Jolie Holland	-
A P R I L	27	The Girl in the Other Room	Diana Krall	-
A P R I L	27	The Good, the Bad, the Ugly	Frankee	-
A P R I L	27	The Inner Circle	Evergrey	-
A P R I L	27	The Last of Tha Pound	Tha Dogg Pound	Compilation
A P R I L	27	Look Mom... No Hands	Vast Aire	Debut
A P R I L	27	Naked	Joan Jett and the Blackhearts	-
A P R I L	27	Re.present	Jimmie's Chicken Shack	-
A P R I L	27	Souls to Deny	Suffocation	-
A P R I L	27	Trampin'	Patti Smith	-
A P R I L	27	The Unrelenting Songs of the 1979 Post Disco Crash	Jason Forrest	-
A P R I L	27	Van Lear Rose	Loretta Lynn	-
M A Y	2	The Concretes	The Concretes	-
M A Y	2	The Icarus Line	Penance Soiree	-
M A Y	3	Bicycles & Tricycles	The Orb	-
M A Y	3	Black Skies in Broad Daylight	Living Things	-
M A Y	3	Marbles	Marillion	-
M A Y	3	My Angel Rocks Back and Forth	Four Tet	EP
M A Y	3	Sung Tongs	Animal Collective	-
M A Y	4	C'mon Miracle	Mirah	-
M A Y	4	Chopstick Bridge	Avoid One Thing	-
M A Y	4	The Crash of '47	Atomship	-
M A Y	4	Emblems	Matt Pond PA	-
M A Y	4	Endangered Species	Flaw	-
M A Y	4	Horse of a Different Color	Big & Rich	-
M A Y	4	i	The Magnetic Fields	-
M A Y	4	Just for You	Lionel Richie	-
M A Y	4	Love Is Hell	Ryan Adams	-
M A Y	4	One Love	Kimberley Locke	-
M A Y	4	ONoffON	Mission of Burma	-
M A Y	4	Platinum & Gold Collection	Lit	Collection
M A Y	4	Rejoicing in the Hands	Devendra Banhart	-
M A Y	4	The Ride	Los Lobos	-
M A Y	4	Southside Double-Wide: Acoustic Live	Sevendust	Live
M A Y	4	Still Writing In My Diary: 2nd Entry	Petey Pablo	-
M A Y	4	Timeless Journey	Patti LaBelle	-
M A Y	4	Too Much Guitar	Reigning Sound	-
M A Y	4	Wave of Mutilation: The Best of the Pixies	Pixies	Compilation
M A Y	4	Wire	Third Day	-
M A Y	5	Greatest Hits	A*Teens	Compilation
M A Y	10	All Roads to Fault	Yourcodenameis:milo	EP
M A Y	10	Hopes and Fears	Keane	-
M A Y	10	Spectral	Skyfire	-
M A Y	11	Come Again	Thornley	Debut
M A Y	11	Dis/Location	Seven Mary Three	-
M A Y	11	The End of Heartache	Killswitch Engage	-
M A Y	11	E. Von Dahl Killed the Locals	The Matches	Epitaph re-release
M A Y	11	Express Yourself	Erik van der Luijt	-
M A Y	11	Here for the Party	Gretchen Wilson	-
M A Y	11	Kool Keith Presents Thee Undatakerz	Thee Undatakerz	-
M A Y	11	Living Legends	8Ball & MJG	-
M A Y	11	Metalogy	Judas Priest	Compilation
M A Y	11	Out to Every Nation	Jorn	-
M A Y	11	Shrek 2: Motion Picture Soundtrack	Various Artists	Soundtrack
M A Y	11	Sonic Firestorm	DragonForce	-
M A Y	16	In Exile Deo	Juliana Hatfield	-
M A Y	16	Live at Tramps, NYC, 1996	De La Soul	Live
M A Y	16	A Song Is A City	Eskimo Joe	-
M A Y	17	The Difference Between Me and You Is That I'm Not on Fire	Mclusky	-
M A Y	17	Happiness in Magazines	Graham Coxon	-
M A Y	17	Iron	Ensiferum	-
M A Y	17	Meltdown	Ash	-
M A Y	18	Asobi Seksu	Asobi Seksu	-
M A Y	18	Baptism	Lenny Kravitz	-
M A Y	18	Catalyst	New Found Glory	-
M A Y	18	Dynamite Boy	Dynamite Boy	-
M A Y	18	The End Is Near	The New Year	-
M A Y	18	Faded Seaside Glamour	Delays	US
M A Y	18	Fuckin A	The Thermals	-
M A Y	18	A Grand Don't Come for Free	The Streets	-
M A Y	18	Guster on Ice	Guster	Live
M A Y	18	Hell to Pay	Dokken	-
M A Y	18	Lafcadio	As Tall as Lions	-
M A Y	18	Let It Die	Feist	-
M A Y	18	My Heart Will Always Be the B-Side to My Tongue	Fall Out Boy	EP/DVD
M A Y	18	Now Here Is Nowhere	The Secret Machines	Debut
M A Y	18	Since We Last Spoke	RJD2	-
M A Y	18	So-Called Chaos	Alanis Morissette	-
M A Y	18	The Throes	Two Gallants	-
M A Y	18	Tical 0: The Prequel	Method Man	-
M A Y	18	You Are the Quarry	Morrissey	-
M A Y	18	You Do Your Thing	Montgomery Gentry	-
M A Y	21	Here We Go Again	SR-71	-
M A Y	24	Coming on Strong	Hot Chip	Debut
M A Y	24	Destroy Rock & Roll	Mylo	-
M A Y	24	Exposures – In Retrospect and Denial	Dark Tranquillity	Compilation
M A Y	24	Hits 58	Various artists	Compilation
M A Y	24	The Human Equation	Ayreon	-
M A Y	24	Lemuria	Therion	-
M A Y	24	Sirius B	Therion	-
M A Y	25	Achilles Heel	Pedro the Lion	-
M A Y	25	Fading Days	Amber Pacific	EP
M A Y	25	The Greater Wrong of the Right	Skinny Puppy	-
M A Y	25	The Human Equation	Ayreon	-
M A Y	25	It's About Time	Christina Milian	-
M A Y	25	Let's Be Us Again	Lonestar	-
M A Y	25	Like Sheep Led to Slaughter	Crisis	-
M A Y	25	Long Gone Before Daylight	The Cardigans	US
M A Y	25	Monolithic Baby!	Monster Magnet	-
M A Y	25	Play to Win	Gabrielle	-
M A Y	25	Rock the Night: The Very Best of Europe	Europe	Compilation
M A Y	25	Rockin' the Rhein with the Grateful Dead	Grateful Dead	Live
M A Y	25	Under My Skin	Avril Lavigne	-
M A Y	25	Vol. 3: (The Subliminal Verses)	Slipknot	-
M A Y	25	White Trash Beautiful	Everlast	-
M A Y	30	Joe's Corsage	Frank Zappa	Compilation
M A Y	31	Borrowed Heaven	The Corrs	-
M A Y	31	I Com	Miss Kittin	-
M A Y	31	Uh Huh Her	PJ Harvey	UK
M A Y	31	Wayward Angel	Kasey Chambers	-
M A Y	?	A Year at the Movies	Social Code	-
J U N E	1	Anything Else but the Truth	The Honorary Title	-
J U N E	1	Auf der Maur	Melissa Auf der Maur	-
J U N E	1	Falling Up	Digby	-
J U N E	1	No Said Date	Masta Killa	Debut
J U N E	1	Ready Now	Truth Hurts	-
J U N E	5	Loud, Mean, Fast and Dirty	Peter Pan Speedrock	-
J U N E	6	DiscO-Zone	O-Zone	-
J U N E	7	Ballet of the Brute	Hatesphere	-
J U N E	7	Guetta Blaster	David Guetta	-
J U N E	7	The Lost Riots	Hope of the States	Debut; UK
J U N E	7	Louden Up Now	!!!	-
J U N E	7	No Roots	Faithless	-
J U N E	7	Once	Nightwish	-
J U N E	7	Outta Sight/Outta Mind	The Datsuns	-
J U N E	7	Rewired	Mike + The Mechanics	-
J U N E	7	Supergrass Is 10	Supergrass	Compilation
J U N E	8	2004 Warped Tour Compilation	Various Artists	Compilation
J U N E	8	The Art of Live	Queensrÿche	Live
J U N E	8	Asshole	Gene Simmons	-
J U N E	8	Contraband	Velvet Revolver	-
J U N E	8	Drill a Hole in That Substrate and Tell Me What You See	Jim White	-
J U N E	8	Egypt	Youssou N'Dour	-
J U N E	8	The Empire Strikes First	Bad Religion	-
J U N E	8	Fast Moving Cars	The Clarks	-
J U N E	8	Greatest Hits '93-'03	311	Compilation
J U N E	8	Happenstance	Rachael Yamagata	-
J U N E	8	International War Criminal	The Slackers	EP
J U N E	8	Keep Your Wig On	Fastball	-
J U N E	8	One Soul Now	Cowboy Junkies	-
J U N E	8	Self Titled	Awol One	-
J U N E	8	The Silence in Black and White	Hawthorne Heights	-
J U N E	8	The Slow Wonder	A.C. Newman	-
J U N E	8	Sonic Nurse	Sonic Youth	-
J U N E	8	Three Cheers for Sweet Revenge	My Chemical Romance	-
J U N E	8	Thunderdome	Pink Cream 69	-
J U N E	8	Two	The Calling	-
J U N E	8	Un	Chumbawamba	-
J U N E	8	Vengo a Cobrar	Mellow Man Ace	-
J U N E	8	White Light Rock & Roll Review	Matthew Good	-
J U N E	12	Maximum XS: The Essential Nazareth	Nazareth	Compilation
J U N E	14	2	OCS	-
J U N E	14	Dark Matter	IQ	-
J U N E	14	Live in Boston	Fleetwood Mac	Live DVD
J U N E	14	A New Day... Live in Las Vegas	Céline Dion	Live
J U N E	14	Sound Shattering Sound	Gyroscope	-
J U N E	14	To the 5 Boroughs	Beastie Boys	-
J U N E	15	The Blind Watchmaker	Mana ERG	-
J U N E	15	Disclaimer II	Seether	-
J U N E	15	Hot Fuss	The Killers	-
J U N E	15	It's About Time	Christina Milian	US
J U N E	15	My Name	BoA	-
J U N E	15	Obsession	Eighteen Visions	-
J U N E	15	The Real New Fall LP (Formerly Country on the Click)	The Fall	-
J U N E	15	Sabacolypse: A Change Gon' Come	Sabac Red	-
J U N E	15	They're Only Chasing Safety	Underøath	-
J U N E	15	23rd St. Lullaby	Patti Scialfa	-
J U N E	15	Undermind	Phish	-
J U N E	16	Rock the 40 Oz: Reloaded	Leftöver Crack	Compilation
J U N E	18	Battering Ram	Iron Savior	-
J U N E	18	Cipher System / By Night	Cipher System and By Night	EP
J U N E	21	Aren't You Dead Yet?	Carnal Forge	-
J U N E	21	One Plus One Is One	Badly Drawn Boy	-
J U N E	21	Riot on an Empty Street	Kings of Convenience	-
J U N E	21	A Semblance of Normality	Skyclad	-
J U N E	21	Sorry I Make You Lush	Wagon Christ	-
J U N E	21	Ta det lugnt	Dungen	-
J U N E	22	1.22.03.Acoustic	Maroon 5	Live
J U N E	22	Creature Comforts	Black Dice	-
J U N E	22	ForThemAsses	OPM	-
J U N E	22	From the End of Your Leash	Bobby Bare Jr's Young Criminals' Starvation League	-
J U N E	22	Gettin' in Over My Head	Brian Wilson	-
J U N E	22	A Ghost Is Born	Wilco	-
J U N E	22	In a Safe Place	The Album Leaf	-
J U N E	22	Houses of the Molé	Ministry	-
J U N E	22	Inferno	Motörhead	-
J U N E	22	JoJo	JoJo	-
J U N E	22	Jupiters Darling	Heart	-
J U N E	22	Kiss of Death	Jadakiss	-
J U N E	22	Lit	Lit	-
J U N E	22	Mystic Chords of Memory	Mystic Chords of Memory	Debut
J U N E	22	Not So Much to Be Loved as to Love	Jonathan Richman	-
J U N E	22	Power of the Blues	Gary Moore	-
J U N E	22	Scream & Whisper	Edwin McCain	-
J U N E	22	Spider-Man 2	Various Artists	Soundtrack
J U N E	22	Unbreakable	Scorpions	-
J U N E	22	Will to Death	John Frusciante	-
J U N E	23	TMG I	Tak Matsumoto Group	-
J U N E	28	Afrodisiac	Brandy	-
J U N E	28	The Cure	The Cure	-
J U N E	28	The Eye of Every Storm	Neurosis	-
J U N E	28	Up All Night	Razorlight	Debut
J U N E	29	Tha Carter	Lil Wayne	-
J U N E	29	The Curse	Atreyu	-
J U N E	29	Dear Diary, My Teen Angst Has a Body Count	From First to Last	-
J U N E	29	Detroit Deli (A Taste of Detroit)	Slum Village	-
J U N E	29	Dwight's Used Records	Dwight Yoakam	Compilation
J U N E	29	Feedback	Rush	EP
J U N E	29	Forget What You Know	Midtown	-
J U N E	29	Free Kamal	Radioinactive and Antimc	-
J U N E	29	The Gorge	Dave Matthews Band	Live
J U N E	29	Hollywood Potato Chip	The Vandals	-
J U N E	29	In Between Evolution	The Tragically Hip	-
J U N E	29	This Magnificent Distance	Chris Robinson	-
J U N E	29	Mojave	Concrete Blonde	-
J U N E	29	Nina Sky	Nina Sky	-
J U N E	29	Revelation	Joe Nichols	-
J U N E	29	Revival	The Reverend Horton Heat	-
J U N E	29	Seventy Two and Sunny	Uncle Kracker	-
J U N E	29	Tiger Army III: Ghost Tigers Rise	Tiger Army	-
J U N E	29	Trouble	Akon	-
J U N E	29	Watch Out!	Alexisonfire	-
J U N E	29	We Are Not Alone	Breaking Benjamin	-
J U N E	29	White2	Sunn O)))	-
J U N E	29	Who Still Kill Sound?	Kid 606	-

=== July–September ===
Date		Album	Artist	Notes
J U L Y	5	Room on the 3rd Floor	McFly	-
J U L Y	6	Fortress In Flames	The Crüxshadows	EP
J U L Y	6	Patient Man	Brad Cotter	-
J U L Y	6	Star Trails	Spirit of the West	-
J U L Y	6	Stone Love	Angie Stone	US
J U L Y	6	Wild Dances	Ruslana	-
J U L Y	12	Armed Love	The (International) Noise Conspiracy	-
J U L Y	12	Braxton Hicks	Jebediah	-
J U L Y	12	The Futureheads	The Futureheads	-
J U L Y	13	At Our Worst	Evergreen Terrace	-
J U L Y	13	Back to Basics	Beenie Man	-
J U L Y	13	Backstroke	Matthew Dear	-
J U L Y	13	Barrio Fino	Daddy Yankee	-
J U L Y	13	Blueberry Boat	The Fiery Furnaces	-
J U L Y	13	The Book of Heavy Metal	Dream Evil	-
J U L Y	13	Caught by the Window	Pilot Speed	US
J U L Y	13	A Cinderella Story: Original Soundtrack	Hilary Duff/Various Artists	Soundtrack
J U L Y	13	DC2: Bars of Death	7L & Esoteric	-
J U L Y	13	Eat Your Face	Guttermouth	-
J U L Y	13	The Funeral of God	Zao	-
J U L Y	13	Happy Love Sick	Shifty	-
J U L Y	13	Humanure	Cattle Decapitation	-
J U L Y	13	Humboldt Beginnings	The Pharcyde	-
J U L Y	13	I	Meshuggah	EP
J U L Y	13	Indian Summer	Carbon Leaf	-
J U L Y	13	It's About Time	Christina Milian	-
J U L Y	13	Keep Right	KRS-One	-
J U L Y	13	Letters to the President	Hawk Nelson	-
J U L Y	13	License to Chill	Jimmy Buffett	-
J U L Y	13	Lock-Sport-Krock	Nikola Šarčević	-
J U L Y	13	Mutual Admiration Society	Mutual Admiration Society	-
J U L Y	13	Out of the Shadow	Rogue Wave	-
J U L Y	13	Porcelain	Sparta	-
J U L Y	13	Shhh...Don't Tell	Adam Sandler	-
J U L Y	13	The Spine	They Might Be Giants	-
J U L Y	13	The Tipping Point	The Roots	-
J U L Y	13	To Tha X-Treme	Devin the Dude	-
J U L Y	13	Together We're Heavy	The Polyphonic Spree	-
J U L Y	13	Über Cobra	Widespread Panic	Live
J U L Y	13	Viking	Lars Frederiksen and the Bastards	-
J U L Y	20	Autobiography	Ashlee Simpson	-
J U L Y	20	B Is for B-sides	Less Than Jake	Compilation
J U L Y	20	Beneath... Between... Beyond...	Static-X	Compilation
J U L Y	20	The Best of Both Worlds	Van Halen	Compilation +3 new songs
J U L Y	20	East Nashville Skyline	Todd Snider	-
J U L Y	20	Elysium	The Velvet Teen	US
J U L Y	20	Hazen Street	Hazen Street	-
J U L Y	20	Miss Machine	The Dillinger Escape Plan	-
J U L Y	20	Southside	Lloyd	-
J U L Y	20	Sweet Somewhere Bound	Jackie Greene	-
J U L Y	20	Tyrannosaurus Hives	The Hives	-
J U L Y	20	White Turns Blue	Maria Mena	-
J U L Y	21	Eternal Warrior	Anthem	-
J U L Y	22	Waste of MFZB	Zebrahead	-
J U L Y	24	Drivetrain	38 Special	-
J U L Y	26	Nostalgialator	Mike Ladd	-
J U L Y	27	A Tribute to Brother Weldon	Monk Hughes & The Outer Realm	
J U L Y	27	The Beginning of Survival	Joni Mitchell	-
J U L Y	27	Blue Cathedral	Comets on Fire	-
J U L Y	27	Drag It Up	Old 97's	-
J U L Y	27	House of Secrets	Otep	-
J U L Y	27	Hymns of the 49th Parallel	k.d. lang	-
J U L Y	27	Kevin Lyttle	Kevin Lyttle	-
J U L Y	27	Kiss & Tell	Sahara Hotnights	-
J U L Y	27	Life After Cash Money	B.G.	-
J U L Y	27	Live at Benaroya Hall	Pearl Jam	Live
J U L Y	27	Live in Hamburg	Maria McKee	Live
J U L Y	27	Lost & Found	Ian Van Dahl	-
J U L Y	27	Now That's What I Call Music! 16 (U.S. series)	Various Artists	Compilation
J U L Y	27	Studio X Sessions EP	Death Cab for Cutie	EP
J U L Y	27	Testimony Live	Neal Morse	DVD
J U L Y	27	True Story	Terror Squad	-
J U L Y	27	Until the End	Kittie	-
J U L Y	27	Where You Want to Be	Taking Back Sunday	-
J U L Y	27	Whiskey Tango Ghosts	Tanya Donelly	-
A U G U S T	3	Alive and Well... In Krakow	Green Carnation	Live
A U G U S T	3	An Elixir for Existence	Sirenia	-
A U G U S T	3	Firestarter	Jimmy Eat World	EP
A U G U S T	3	Red Hot Chili Peppers Live in Hyde Park	Red Hot Chili Peppers	Live
A U G U S T	3	...Is a Real Boy	Say Anything	-
A U G U S T	3	A Long Hot Summer	Masta Ace	-
A U G U S T	3	M.I.A.M.I.	Pitbull	-
A U G U S T	3	Ride This – The Covers EP	Los Lobos	EP
A U G U S T	3	Riders in the Sky Present: Davy Crockett, King of the Wild Frontier	Riders in the Sky	-
A U G U S T	3	Subsurface	Threshold	-
A U G U S T	3	Ticonderoga	Morning 40 Federation	-
A U G U S T	6	2Pac Live	2Pac	Live
A U G U S T	9	3.0	Safri Duo	-
A U G U S T	9	Distant Sense of Random Menace	Urthboy	-
A U G U S T	10	Album of the Year	The Good Life	-
A U G U S T	10	Amerikaz Nightmare	Mobb Deep	-
A U G U S T	10	Automatic Writing	Ataxia	-
A U G U S T	10	The Best of Coal Chamber	Coal Chamber	Compilation
A U G U S T	10	The Blessed and the Damned	Iced Earth	Compilation
A U G U S T	10	Book of Silk	Tin Hat Trio	-
A U G U S T	10	Bubblegum	Mark Lanegan	-
A U G U S T	10	Creamfields	Paul Oakenfold	Remix
A U G U S T	10	Crosby & Nash	David Crosby & Graham Nash	-
A U G U S T	10	Diesel Truckers	Kool Keith	-
A U G U S T	10	Fire in the Hole	Brand Nubian	-
A U G U S T	10	It's Already Written	Houston	-
A U G U S T	10	Kidz Bop 6	Kidz Bop Kids	-
A U G U S T	10	My Own Best Enemy	Richard Marx	-
A U G U S T	10	One Day Remains	Alter Bridge	Debut
A U G U S T	10	Rock Against Bush, Vol. 2	Various Artists, Rock Against Bush	Compilation
A U G U S T	10	Siren Song of the Counter Culture	Rise Against	-
A U G U S T	10	The Way It Really Is	Lisa Loeb	-
A U G U S T	10	Whiskey Tango Ghosts	Tanya Donelly	-
A U G U S T	11	Always Outnumbered, Never Outgunned	The Prodigy	-
A U G U S T	11	Partytime	The Cheeky Girls	-
A U G U S T	13	Joyful Rebellion	k-os	-
A U G U S T	16	Grey Will Fade	Charlotte Hatherley	-
A U G U S T	17	All City	Northern State	-
A U G U S T	17	Decadence	Head Automatica	-
A U G U S T	17	Free the Bees	The Bees	-
A U G U S T	17	The Hard Way	213	-
A U G U S T	17	Have a Little Faith	Mavis Staples	-
A U G U S T	17	Love Everybody	The Presidents of the United States of America	-
A U G U S T	17	Lyfe 268-192	Lyfe Jennings	-
A U G U S T	17	Moonlight Survived	Moments in Grace	Debut album
A U G U S T	17	More Adventurous	Rilo Kiley	-
A U G U S T	17	Music to Start a Cult To	Gram Rabbit	Debut album
A U G U S T	17	Seven Circles	The Tea Party	Final Album
A U G U S T	17	Survival of the Sickest	Saliva	-
A U G U S T	17	Take It All Away	Ryan Cabrera	-
A U G U S T	18	?	Enuff Z'nuff	-
A U G U S T	23	Always Outnumbered, Never Outgunned	The Prodigy	UK
A U G U S T	23	Flowers in the Pavement	Bliss n Eso	Debut
A U G U S T	23	Leaders Not Followers: Part 2	Napalm Death	Covers album
A U G U S T	23	Pigs of the Roman Empire	Lustmord & Melvins	-
A U G U S T	23	Winchester Cathedral	Clinic	-
A U G U S T	24	Alive & Amplified	The Mooney Suzuki	-
A U G U S T	24	Beat Cafe	Donovan	-
A U G U S T	24	Connected	The Foreign Exchange	-
A U G U S T	24	The Dirty South	Drive-By Truckers	-
A U G U S T	24	Earthtones	Crown City Rockers	-
A U G U S T	24	Folkloric Feel	Apostle of Hustle	Debut
A U G U S T	24	Half Smiles of the Decomposed	Guided by Voices	-
A U G U S T	24	Happy People/U Saved Me	R. Kelly	-
A U G U S T	24	Hide Nothing	Further Seems Forever	-
A U G U S T	24	The Hustle	G. Love & Special Sauce	-
A U G U S T	24	Jump Back: The Best of The Rolling Stones	The Rolling Stones	US; Compilation
A U G U S T	24	Legacy of Blood	Jedi Mind Tricks	-
A U G U S T	24	Letters	Butch Walker	-
A U G U S T	24	Lift	Sister Hazel	-
A U G U S T	24	Live Like You Were Dying	Tim McGraw	-
A U G U S T	24	Luminaria	Ian Moore	-
A U G U S T	24	On My Way to Church	Jim Jones	-
A U G U S T	24	Paper	Rich Robinson	-
A U G U S T	24	Potter's Field	12 Stones	-
A U G U S T	24	Radical Connector	Mouse on Mars	-
A U G U S T	24	The Revolution Starts Now	Steve Earle	-
A U G U S T	24	The Secondman's Middle Stand	Mike Watt	-
A U G U S T	24	She Loves You	The Twilight Singers	Covers album
A U G U S T	24	Straight Outta Cashville	Young Buck	-
A U G U S T	24	Super D	Ben Folds	EP
A U G U S T	24	Tambourine	Tift Merritt	-
A U G U S T	24	Tessie	Dropkick Murphys	EP
A U G U S T	24	Theme for a Broken Soul	DJ Rels	-
A U G U S T	24	Throwback, Vol. 1	Boyz II Men	Covers album
A U G U S T	24	Tonight, Not Again: Jason Mraz Live at the Eagles Ballroom	Jason Mraz	-
A U G U S T	24	The Unbroken Circle: The Musical Heritage of the Carter Family	Various	compilation
A U G U S T	24	A Valid Path	Alan Parsons	-
A U G U S T	24	Welcome Back	Mase	-
A U G U S T	25	The Bassmachine	Basshunter	-
A U G U S T	30	Don't Look Now	Way Out West	-
A U G U S T	30	Everything Will Be Alright Tomorrow	Faithless	-
A U G U S T	30	Killing Heidi	Killing Heidi	-
A U G U S T	30	The Libertines	The Libertines	-
A U G U S T	30	Medúlla	Björk	-
A U G U S T	30	Pleasureman	Günther	Debut
A U G U S T	30	Silent Nation	Asia	-
A U G U S T	31	Ashes of the Wake	Lamb of God	-
A U G U S T	31	Beautifully Human: Words and Sounds Vol. 2	Jill Scott	-
A U G U S T	31	Circle of Snakes	Danzig	-
A U G U S T	31	The DEFinition	LL Cool J	-
A U G U S T	31	Fuck World Trade	Leftöver Crack	-
A U G U S T	31	Genius Loves Company	Ray Charles	-
A U G U S T	31	Getting Away with Murder	Papa Roach	-
A U G U S T	31	Hell's Pit	Insane Clown Posse	-
A U G U S T	31	Leviathan	Mastodon	-
A U G U S T	31	Rhythm of Time	Jordan Rudess	-
A U G U S T	31	Sail On: The 30th Anniversary Collection	Kansas	Compilation+DVD
A U G U S T	31	The Spine Hits the Road	They Might Be Giants	Live
A U G U S T	31	Weightlifting	Trashcan Sinatras	-
A U G U S T	?	A Girl Called Eddy	A Girl Called Eddy	Debut
S E P T E M B E R	1	The Romance of Kenny G	Kenny G	Compilation
S E P T E M B E R	3	Wu Ha	Will Pan	-
S E P T E M B E R	6	Bluffer's Guide to the Flight Deck	Flotation Toy Warning	-
S E P T E M B E R	6	De wereld rond	K3	-
S E P T E M B E R	6	Fate of Norns	Amon Amarth	-
S E P T E M B E R	6	Sardonic Wrath	Darkthrone	-
S E P T E M B E R	6	Showtime	Dizzee Rascal	-
S E P T E M B E R	6	The Sound of White	Missy Higgins	-
S E P T E M B E R	6	Temple of Shadows	Angra	-
S E P T E M B E R	6	Unwritten	Natasha Bedingfield	UK
S E P T E M B E R	6	Voice	Alison Moyet	UK, covers album
S E P T E M B E R	7	Art Damage	Fear Before the March of Flames	-
S E P T E M B E R	7	Jaku	DJ Krush	-
S E P T E M B E R	7	The Big Eyeball in the Sky	Colonel Claypool's Bucket of Bernie Brains	-
S E P T E M B E R	7	End of the World Party (Just in Case)	Medeski, Martin & Wood	-
S E P T E M B E R	7	Home for an Island	The Exit	-
S E P T E M B E R	7	I Got Love in These Streetz	Daz Dillinger	-
S E P T E M B E R	7	Let It Enfold You	Senses Fail	-
S E P T E M B E R	7	Living Things	Matthew Sweet	-
S E P T E M B E R	7	Master of the Moon	Dio	-
S E P T E M B E R	7	My Everything	Anita Baker	-
S E P T E M B E R	7	Rubber Factory	The Black Keys	-
S E P T E M B E R	7	Stealing of a Nation	Radio 4	-
S E P T E M B E R	7	Underdog Victorious	Jill Sobule	-
S E P T E M B E R	7	The Very Best of Macy Gray	Macy Gray	Compilation
S E P T E M B E R	7	We Live: The Black Samurai	C-Rayz Walz	EP
S E P T E M B E R	7	What I Do	Alan Jackson	-
S E P T E M B E R	8	Exodus	Utada	Japan
S E P T E M B E R	10	IM the Supervisor	Infected Mushroom	-
S E P T E M B E R	13	Kasabian	Kasabian	UK
S E P T E M B E R	13	Let's Bottle Bohemia	The Thrills	-
S E P T E M B E R	13	Nino Rojo	Devendra Banhart	-
S E P T E M B E R	13	Out of Nothing	Embrace	-
S E P T E M B E R	13	Season for Assault	8 Foot Sativa	-
S E P T E M B E R	13	The Singles 1986–1995	Duran Duran	Box Set
S E P T E M B E R	13	Solarized	Ian Brown	-
S E P T E M B E R	13	Strangers	Ed Harcourt	-
S E P T E M B E R	13	The Tension and the Spark	Darren Hayes	-
S E P T E M B E R	13	Thunder, Lightning, Strike	The Go! Team	Debut
S E P T E M B E R	14	DC EP	John Frusciante	EP
S E P T E M B E R	14	Don't Cut Your Fabric to This Year's Fashion	Action Action	Debut
S E P T E M B E R	14	Eat My Heart Out	The Dollyrots	-
S E P T E M B E R	14	Everybody Loves a Happy Ending	Tears for Fears	-
S E P T E M B E R	14	Exhibit A	The Features	-
S E P T E M B E R	14	Funeral	Arcade Fire	-
S E P T E M B E R	14	The Giant Pin	The Nels Cline Singers	-
S E P T E M B E R	14	A Hangover You Don't Deserve	Bowling for Soup	-
S E P T E M B E R	14	Quaudiophiliac	Frank Zappa	-
S E P T E M B E R	14	The Revelry	Bullets and Octane	-
S E P T E M B E R	14	The Clarence Greenwood Recordings	Citizen Cope	-
S E P T E M B E R	14	Set Yourself on Fire	Stars	-
S E P T E M B E R	14	So Jealous	Tegan and Sara	-
S E P T E M B E R	14	Studio 150	Paul Weller	-
S E P T E M B E R	14	Sweat and Suit Double albums	Nelly	-
S E P T E M B E R	14	The System Has Failed	Megadeth	-
S E P T E M B E R	14	Trouble	Ray LaMontagne	-
S E P T E M B E R	14	Turn	The Ex	Double LP
S E P T E M B E R	14	Wayward Angel	Kasey Chambers	-
S E P T E M B E R	14	Wet from Birth	The Faint	-
S E P T E M B E R	14	Wheel of Life	Karmakanic	-
S E P T E M B E R	14	Within a Mile of Home	Flogging Molly	-
S E P T E M B E R	17	Burn the Maps	The Frames	-
S E P T E M B E R	20	Abattoir Blues / The Lyre of Orpheus	Nick Cave and the Bad Seeds	-
S E P T E M B E R	20	American Idiot	Green Day	-
S E P T E M B E R	20	Hits 59	Various artists	Compilation
S E P T E M B E R	20	More Deep Cuts	Thee More Shallows	-
S E P T E M B E R	20	One for the Road	Ocean Colour Scene	Live
S E P T E M B E R	20	Seclusion	Aereogramme	-
S E P T E M B E R	20	Universal Audio	The Delgados	Final album
S E P T E M B E R	21	1st Infantry	The Alchemist	Debut
S E P T E M B E R	21	Be Here	Keith Urban	US
S E P T E M B E R	21	City	Client	-
S E P T E M B E R	21	Deja Vu All Over Again	John Fogerty	-
S E P T E M B E R	21	The Delivery Man	Elvis Costello	-
S E P T E M B E R	21	Dreaming in Color	Jump5	-
S E P T E M B E R	21	Eucademix	Yuka Honda	-
S E P T E M B E R	21	Il Sogno	Elvis Costello	-
S E P T E M B E R	21	Last Exit	Junior Boys	Debut
S E P T E M B E R	21	The Late Great Daniel Johnston: Discovered Covered	Various Artists	-
S E P T E M B E R	21	London Calling: 25th Anniversary Legacy Edition	The Clash	LP & DVD
S E P T E M B E R	21	Mirages	Tim Hecker	-
S E P T E M B E R	21	The New What Next	Hot Water Music	-
S E P T E M B E R	21	Night on Fire	VHS or Beta	-
S E P T E M B E R	21	Noise from the Basement	Skye Sweetnam	-
S E P T E M B E R	21	Oxeneers or the Lion Sleeps When Its Antelope Go Home	These Arms Are Snakes	-
S E P T E M B E R	21	Remixed!	Scissor Sisters	EP
S E P T E M B E R	21	Riders of the Apocalypse	Demonoid	-
S E P T E M B E R	21	Romeoland	Lil' Romeo	-
S E P T E M B E R	21	Saul Williams	Saul Williams	-
S E P T E M B E R	21	Shine	Meredith Brooks	Reissue of 2002's Bad Bad One
S E P T E M B E R	21	Songs in the Key of Eh	Mad Caddies	Live
S E P T E M B E R	21	There Will Be a Light	Ben Harper and The Blind Boys of Alabama	-
S E P T E M B E R	21	This Is My Time	Raven-Symoné	-
S E P T E M B E R	21	This Type of Thinking (Could Do Us In)	Chevelle	-
S E P T E M B E R	21	This Week	Jean Grae	-
S E P T E M B E R	21	You Fail Me	Converge	-
S E P T E M B E R	21	The War Within	Shadows Fall	-
S E P T E M B E R	22	Start from the Dark	Europe	-
S E P T E M B E R	23	The Other Side of Earth	The Last Goodnight	-
S E P T E M B E R	24	Dreamland	Joni Mitchell	-
S E P T E M B E R	25	This Is What the Edge of Your Seat Was Made For	Bring Me the Horizon	EP
S E P T E M B E R	26	By Request	Brett Kissel	-
S E P T E M B E R	26	Future Perfect	Autolux	-
S E P T E M B E R	27	Antics	Interpol	-
S E P T E M B E R	27	RockShocks	Loudness	Self-cover album
S E P T E M B E R	27	Never Apologise Never Explain	Therapy?	-
S E P T E M B E R	27	Nightmares Made Flesh	Bloodbath	-
S E P T E M B E R	27	Prelude to History	Preluders	-
S E P T E M B E R	27	Symphony of Enchanted Lands II: The Dark Secret	Rhapsody	-
S E P T E M B E R	28	Advance and Vanquish	3 Inches of Blood	-
S E P T E M B E R	28	Anniemal	Annie	Debut
S E P T E M B E R	28	Bat Out of Hell: Live with the Melbourne Symphony Orchestra	Meat Loaf	Live
S E P T E M B E R	28	Beautiful Soul	Jesse McCartney	-
S E P T E M B E R	28	The Beautiful Struggle	Talib Kweli	-
S E P T E M B E R	28	Before the Poison	Marianne Faithfull	-
S E P T E M B E R	28	Brian Wilson Presents Smile	Brian Wilson	-
S E P T E M B E R	28	Christian Bautista	(Philippines) Christian Bautista	-
S E P T E M B E R	28	The Dana Owens Album	Queen Latifah	-
S E P T E M B E R	28	Feels Like Today	Rascal Flatts	-
S E P T E M B E R	28	Goodies	Ciara	-
S E P T E M B E R	28	Hilary Duff	Hilary Duff	-
S E P T E M B E R	28	In Love and Death	The Used	-
S E P T E M B E R	28	Jackassolantern	Widespread Panic	Live
S E P T E M B E R	28	Lest We Forget: The Best Of	Marilyn Manson	Compilation +1 new track
S E P T E M B E R	28	Lionheart	Saxon	-
S E P T E M B E R	28	Mind Body & Soul	Joss Stone	-
S E P T E M B E R	28	The Neon God: Part 2 – The Demise	W.A.S.P.	-
S E P T E M B E R	28	Reset	Mutemath	EP
S E P T E M B E R	28	Scores	Barry Manilow	-
S E P T E M B E R	28	Sex, Love and Rock 'n' Roll	Social Distortion	-
S E P T E M B E R	28	Shaken Not Stirred	Phil Vassar	-
S E P T E M B E R	28	Shangri-La	Mark Knopfler	-
S E P T E M B E R	28	Show and Tell	Silvertide	-
S E P T E M B E R	28	A Tiger Dancing	Heiruspecs	-
S E P T E M B E R	28	Trouble	Bonnie McKee	-
S E P T E M B E R	28	Young Prayer	Panda Bear	-

=== October–December ===
Date		Album	Artist	Notes
O C T O B E R	1	Joe's Domage	Frank Zappa	-
O C T O B E R	1	Where Tradition Meets Tomorrow	Jonathan Coulton	EP
O C T O B E R	1	While You Are Gone	Bradley Joseph	-
O C T O B E R	4	Confessions (Special Edition)	Usher	UK
O C T O B E R	4	Falling Out	Peter Bjorn and John	-
O C T O B E R	4	Late Night Tales: Four Tet	Four Tet	Compilation
O C T O B E R	5	Around the Sun	R.E.M.	-
O C T O B E R	5	The Audio Injected Soul	Mnemic	-
O C T O B E R	5	Audit in Progress	Hot Snakes	-
O C T O B E R	5	Barenaked for the Holidays	Barenaked Ladies	Christmas
O C T O B E R	5	Black Tape	The Explosion	-
O C T O B E R	5	Catch for Us the Foxes	MewithoutYou	-
O C T O B E R	5	The Chronicles of Life and Death	Good Charlotte	-
O C T O B E R	5	ClassiKhan	Chaka Khan	-
O C T O B E R	5	Cryptooology	Yowie	-
O C T O B E R	5	The Disrupt	Oh No	Debut
O C T O B E R	5	Everything I've Got in My Pocket	Minnie Driver	-
O C T O B E R	5	FWX	Fates Warning	-
O C T O B E R	5	Greatest Hits, Volume 1	Korn	Compilation +2 new tracks
O C T O B E R	5	The Grind Date	De La Soul	-
O C T O B E R	5	Has Been	William Shatner	-
O C T O B E R	5	Left of the Dial: Dispatches from the '80s Underground	Various Artists	Compilation
O C T O B E R	5	Legs to Make Us Longer	Kaki King	-
O C T O B E R	5	Live at Budokan	Dream Theater	Live
O C T O B E R	5	The Lost Riots	Hope of the States	US
O C T O B E R	5	A New White	Subtle	Debut
O C T O B E R	5	The Ones We Never Knew	Holly Williams	-
O C T O B E R	5	Palookaville	Fatboy Slim	-
O C T O B E R	5	The Place You're In	Kenny Wayne Shepherd	-
O C T O B E R	5	Pressure Chief	Cake	-
O C T O B E R	5	Real Gone	Tom Waits	-
O C T O B E R	5	Size Matters	Helmet	-
O C T O B E R	5	Soul of a New Machine	Fear Factory	Reissue/Remastered
O C T O B E R	5	Spooked	Robyn Hitchcock	-
O C T O B E R	5	Ten Years Gone: The Best of Everclear 1994–2004	Everclear	Compilation
O C T O B E R	5	Unshattered	Peter Murphy	-
O C T O B E R	5	Welcome to Haiti: Creole 101	Wyclef Jean	-
O C T O B E R	11	10 Years of Hits	Ronan Keating	Compilation
O C T O B E R	11	Astronaut	Duran Duran	LP & DVD
O C T O B E R	11	Back to Bedlam	James Blunt	Debut
O C T O B E R	11	The Collection	Cast	Compilation
O C T O B E R	11	The Collection	Shed Seven	Compilation
O C T O B E R	11	Cosima	Cosima De Vito	-
O C T O B E R	11	Demigod	Behemoth	-
O C T O B E R	11	False Alarm	KT Tunstall	EP
O C T O B E R	11	Hearts in Mind	Nanci Griffith	-
O C T O B E R	11	Music for Nurses	Oceansize	-
O C T O B E R	11	Pure Trash	Dosh	-
O C T O B E R	11	Reckoning Night	Sonata Arctica	-
O C T O B E R	11	Satan's Circus	Death in Vegas	-
O C T O B E R	11	Sirenian Shores	Sirenia	EP
O C T O B E R	12	The Artist Collection: Busta Rhymes	Busta Rhymes	Compilation
O C T O B E R	12	Christmas	Chris Isaak	Christmas
O C T O B E R	12	Chuck	Sum 41	-
O C T O B E R	12	Dangerous Dreams	Moving Units	Debut
O C T O B E R	12	Deceiver	Chris Thile	-
O C T O B E R	12	Early Trax	Ministry	Compilation
O C T O B E R	12	Frank Black Francis	Frank Black	-
O C T O B E R	12	Heart & Soul	Joe Cocker	-
O C T O B E R	12	The Lost Christmas Eve	Trans-Siberian Orchestra	Christmas
O C T O B E R	12	Miracle	Céline Dion	-
O C T O B E R	12	Mississauga Goddam	The Hidden Cameras	-
O C T O B E R	12	Munly & the Lee Lewis Harlots	Munly	-
O C T O B E R	12	The New Danger	Mos Def	-
O C T O B E R	12	New Roman Times	Camper Van Beethoven	-
O C T O B E R	12	Platinum & Gold Collection	Toni Braxton	Compilation
O C T O B E R	12	P.S.I.entology	Pitchshifter	DVD
O C T O B E R	12	Scenic	Denver Harbor	-
O C T O B E R	12	Shake off the Dust... Arise	Matisyahu	-
O C T O B E R	12	Songs of the Unforgiven	Crash Test Dummies	-
O C T O B E R	12	Straylight Run	Straylight Run	-
O C T O B E R	12	Summer in Abaddon	Pinback	-
O C T O B E R	12	Tarantula	Flickerstick	-
O C T O B E R	12	Terrifyer	Pig Destroyer	-
O C T O B E R	18	Alfie: Music from the Motion Picture	Mick Jagger/David A. Stewart/Various Artists	Soundtrack
O C T O B E R	18	Alizée en concert	Alizée	Live
O C T O B E R	18	Beautiful Life	Guy Sebastian	-
O C T O B E R	18	One	Dirty Vegas	-
O C T O B E R	18	Origin Vol. 1	The Soundtrack of Our Lives	Europe
O C T O B E R	18	Silver Box	Simple Minds	Box Set
O C T O B E R	18	A Smile	Dappled Cities Fly	-
O C T O B E R	18	Who Killed...... The Zutons?	The Zutons	-
O C T O B E R	19	Alpha and Omega	Bizzy Bone	-
O C T O B E R	19	As/Is	John Mayer	Live
O C T O B E R	19	Casting the Stones	Jag Panzer	-
O C T O B E R	19	Coup de Theatre	Haiku d'Etat	-
O C T O B E R	19	Enjoy Every Sandwich: The Songs of Warren Zevon	Various Artists	Warren Zevon tribute
O C T O B E R	19	From a Basement on the Hill	Elliott Smith	-
O C T O B E R	19	Futures	Jimmy Eat World	-
O C T O B E R	19	Graveyard Classics 2	Six Feet Under	Covers album
O C T O B E R	19	The Greatest Hits	Juvenile	Compilation
O C T O B E R	19	The Greatest Hits Collection II	Brooks & Dunn	Compilation
O C T O B E R	19	Never Breathe What You Can't See	Jello Biafra & Melvins	-
O C T O B E R	19	Panopticon	Isis	-
O C T O B E R	19	The Rest Is History	Jin	-
O C T O B E R	19	Revolver	The Haunted	-
O C T O B E R	19	Shake the Sheets	Ted Leo and the Pharmacists	-
O C T O B E R	19	Stardust: the Great American Songbook 3	Rod Stewart	Covers album
O C T O B E R	19	Still Hungry	Twisted Sister	Re-recording of Stay Hungry +4 new tracks
O C T O B E R	19	Team America: World Police	Various artists	Soundtrack
O C T O B E R	19	This Island	Le Tigre	-
O C T O B E R	19	Words & Music: John Mellencamp's Greatest Hits	John Mellencamp	2xCD compilation +2 new tracks
O C T O B E R	19	You Just Gotta Love Christmas	Peter Cetera	Christmas
O C T O B E R	20	Sol-fa	Asian Kung-Fu Generation	-
O C T O B E R	24	The Good, the Bad and the Ugly Vol. 1	Powerman 5000	Compilation
O C T O B E R	25	Batards Sensibles	TTC	-
O C T O B E R	25	Do You Want New Wave or Do You Want the Soft Pink Truth?	The Soft Pink Truth	-
O C T O B E R	25	Live Twice	Darius	-
O C T O B E R	25	Tage Mahal	Jon Oliva's Pain	-
O C T O B E R	26	2067	Rheostatics	-
O C T O B E R	26	All for You	Annihilator	-
O C T O B E R	26	Buju and Friends	Buju Banton	Compilation
O C T O B E R	26	Crooked Rain, Crooked Rain: LA's Desert Origins	Pavement	-
O C T O B E R	26	Dear Heather	Leonard Cohen	-
O C T O B E R	26	Flyleaf	Flyleaf	EP
O C T O B E R	26	Gold Medal	The Donnas	-
O C T O B E R	26	Healing Rain	Michael W. Smith	-
O C T O B E R	26	Inside of Emptiness	John Frusciante	-
O C T O B E R	26	It Always Will Be	Willie Nelson	-
O C T O B E R	26	Key	Son, Ambulance	-
O C T O B E R	26	Live at Wolf Trap	The Doobie Brothers	Live
O C T O B E R	26	Our Kind of Soul	Hall & Oates	-
O C T O B E R	26	Please Describe Yourself	Dogs Die in Hot Cars	-
O C T O B E R	26	Poe Little Rich Girl	Jacki-O	-
O C T O B E R	26	Rendezvous	Luna	-
O C T O B E R	26	Still Not Getting Any...	Simple Plan	LP & DVD
O C T O B E R	26	Thank You Good Night Sold Out	The Dears	Live
O C T O B E R	26	Then and Again	Voltaire	-
O C T O B E R	26	Thug Matrimony: Married to the Streets	Trick Daddy	-
O C T O B E R	26	Thunderball	U.D.O.	-
O C T O B E R	26	Twice the Speed of Life	Sugarland	Debut
O C T O B E R	26	Unfinished Business	Jay-Z & R. Kelly	-
O C T O B E R	26	Watching the Snow	Michael Franks	-
O C T O B E R	26	War Party	Gwar	-
O C T O B E R	26	Wolfmother	Wolfmother	EP
O C T O B E R	26	You're a Woman, I'm a Machine	Death From Above 1979	-
O C T O B E R	27	Yumi Shizukusa II	Yumi Shizukusa	-
O C T O B E R	29	One Way	Selwyn	-
N O V E M B E R	1	Acoustic	John Lennon	Compilation
N O V E M B E R	1	Aha Shake Heartbreak	Kings of Leon	UK
N O V E M B E R	1	All the Best	Tina Turner	Compilation +3 new tracks
N O V E M B E R	1	A Brief History...	The Waifs	Australia; Live
N O V E M B E R	1	Interim	The Fall	Compilation
N O V E M B E R	1	Isa	Enslaved	-
N O V E M B E R	1	Lifeblood	Manic Street Preachers	-
N O V E M B E R	1	Live Licks	The Rolling Stones	Live
N O V E M B E R	1	This is Music: The Singles 92-98	The Verve	UK; Compilation
N O V E M B E R	2	Adicción, Tradición, Revolución	Voodoo Glow Skulls	-
N O V E M B E R	2	Alive at Last	Train	Live
N O V E M B E R	2	A Types	Hopesfall	-
N O V E M B E R	2	Awake: The Best of Live	Live	Compilation
N O V E M B E R	2	Closure	Everclear	EP/Compilation
N O V E M B E R	2	Dead Eyes See No Future	Arch Enemy	EP
N O V E M B E R	2	Devotion	Newsboys	-
N O V E M B E R	2	eMOTIVe	A Perfect Circle	Covers album
N O V E M B E R	2	Jobe Bells	Afroman	Christmas
N O V E M B E R	2	Le compte complet	Malajube	-
N O V E M B E R	2	Live!	Catch 22	Live
N O V E M B E R	2	Live at St. Ann's Warehouse	Aimee Mann	Live
N O V E M B E R	2	Mmhmm	Relient K	-
N O V E M B E R	2	My Brother & Me	Ying Yang Twins	Compilation
N O V E M B E R	2	Nothing Is Easy: Live at the Isle of Wight 1970	Jethro Tull	Live
N O V E M B E R	2	Now That's What I Call Music! 17 (U.S. series)	Various Artists	Compilation
N O V E M B E R	2	One	Neal Morse	-
N O V E M B E R	2	Reise, Reise	Rammstein	-
N O V E M B E R	2	Singles	Travis	Compilation
N O V E M B E R	2	Sleep and Wake-Up Songs	Okkervil River	-
N O V E M B E R	7	The Beginning and the End	Bizzy Bone	-
N O V E M B E R	8	2. OG	Overground	-
N O V E M B E R	8	Allow Us to Be Frank	Westlife	Covers album
N O V E M B E R	8	Best 1991–2004	Seal	Compilation
N O V E M B E R	8	The Destiny Stone	Pride of Lions	-
N O V E M B E R	8	Live! Thirty Days Ago	Phoenix	Live
N O V E M B E R	8	Mistaken Identity	Delta Goodrem	-
N O V E M B E R	8	A Point Too Far to Astronaut	Telephone Jim Jesus	-
N O V E M B E R	8	R.U.L.E.	Ja Rule	-
N O V E M B E R	8	Second First Impression	Daniel Bedingfield	-
N O V E M B E R	8	Wet Wet Wet: The Greatest Hits	Wet Wet Wet	Compilation
N O V E M B E R	9	All In	Stroke 9	-
N O V E M B E R	9	Greatest Hits: My Prerogative	Britney Spears	Compilation +3 new tracks
N O V E M B E R	9	The Greatest Songs Ever Written (By Us!)	NOFX	Compilation
N O V E M B E R	9	The Great Santa Barbara Oil Slick	John Fahey	Live
N O V E M B E R	9	Harmonium	Vanessa Carlton	-
N O V E M B E R	9	Home Movies	Pennywise	Re-issue; DVD
N O V E M B E R	9	Horn of Plenty	Grizzly Bear	-
N O V E M B E R	9	México en la Piel	Luis Miguel	-
N O V E M B E R	9	Number Ones	Bee Gees	Compilation
N O V E M B E R	9	Occasus	The Amenta	-
N O V E M B E R	9	Peachtree Road	Elton John	-
N O V E M B E R	9	Queen on Fire – Live at the Bowl	Queen	US; Live LP & DVD
N O V E M B E R	9	Real Talk	Fabolous	-
N O V E M B E R	9	The SpongeBob SquarePants Movie – Music from the Movie and More...	Various Artists	Soundtrack
N O V E M B E R	9	The Tigers Have Spoken	Neko Case	Live
N O V E M B E R	9	Vulture Street	Powderfinger	US
N O V E M B E R	9	White People	Handsome Boy Modeling School	-
N O V E M B E R	11	Ballads of Living and Dying	Marissa Nadler	Debut
N O V E M B E R	12	Encore	Eminem	-
N O V E M B E R	15	Best of Blue	Blue	UK; Compilation
N O V E M B E R	15	Lost to Apathy	Dark Tranquillity	-
N O V E M B E R	15	Now That's What I Call Music! 59 (UK series)	Various Artists	Compilation
N O V E M B E R	15	The Silent Force	Within Temptation	-
N O V E M B E R	15	This is Music: The Singles 92-98	The Verve	US; Compilation
N O V E M B E R	16	100,000,000 Bon Jovi Fans Can't Be Wrong	Bon Jovi	Box Set
N O V E M B E R	16	Amotion	A Perfect Circle	LP & DVD
N O V E M B E R	16	The Best of Mandy Moore	Mandy Moore	Compilation
N O V E M B E R	16	The Capitol Albums, Volume 1	The Beatles	Box Set
N O V E M B E R	16	Crunk Juice	Lil Jon & the East Side Boyz	-
N O V E M B E R	16	Destiny Fulfilled	Destiny's Child	-
N O V E M B E R	16	Die, Rugged Man, Die	R.A. the Rugged Man	Debut
N O V E M B E R	16	Greatest Hits	Bone Thugs-n-Harmony	Compilation
N O V E M B E R	16	Greatest Hits	Neil Young	Compilation
N O V E M B E R	16	Hi Hi Puffy AmiYumi	Puffy AmiYumi	Compilation
N O V E M B E R	16	Just Beyond the River	James Yorkston and the Athletes	-
N O V E M B E R	16	The Kottonmouth Xperience	Kottonmouth Kings	-
N O V E M B E R	16	Merry Christmas with Love	Clay Aiken	Christmas
N O V E M B E R	16	Michael Jackson: The Ultimate Collection	Michael Jackson	Box Set
N O V E M B E R	16	Mm..Food	MF Doom	-
N O V E M B E R	16	Our Worlds Divorce	This Providence	-
N O V E M B E R	16	The Popsicle EP	Zolof the Rock & Roll Destroyer	EP
N O V E M B E R	16	Powerballin'	Chingy	-
N O V E M B E R	16	The Ransom	Cartel	EP
N O V E M B E R	16	Real	Ivy Queen	-
N O V E M B E R	16	rearviewmirror (Greatest Hits 1991–2003)	Pearl Jam	Compilation
N O V E M B E R	16	Want Two	Rufus Wainwright	-
N O V E M B E R	16	Youth	Collective Soul	-
N O V E M B E R	22	Greatest Hits	Creed	Compilation
N O V E M B E R	22	How to Dismantle an Atomic Bomb	U2	-
N O V E M B E R	22	Ultimate Kylie	Kylie Minogue	Greatest hits
N O V E M B E R	23	Anywhere But Home	Evanescence	Live
N O V E M B E R	23	At Last...The Duets Album	Kenny G	Covers album
N O V E M B E R	23	Chapter III	Allure	-
N O V E M B E R	23	Family Style	Jet	DVD
N O V E M B E R	23	Field Rexx	Blitzen Trapper	-
N O V E M B E R	23	Free Yourself	Fantasia	-
N O V E M B E R	23	The Greater of Two Evils	Anthrax	Compilation
N O V E M B E R	23	Hoy Quiero Soñar	Cristian Castro	-
N O V E M B E R	23	I Need an Angel	Ruben Studdard	-
N O V E M B E R	23	Live in Buffalo: July 4th, 2004	Goo Goo Dolls	Live
N O V E M B E R	23	Lonely Runs Both Ways	Alison Krauss & Union Station	-
N O V E M B E R	23	Love. Angel. Music. Baby.	Gwen Stefani	Solo debut
N O V E M B E R	23	Play Around the Christmas Tree	Play	Christmas
N O V E M B E R	23	R&G (Rhythm & Gangsta): The Masterpiece	Snoop Dogg	-
N O V E M B E R	23	The Red Light District	Ludacris	-
N O V E M B E R	23	Rejoyce: The Christmas Album	Jessica Simpson	Christmas
N O V E M B E R	23	So Cold	Breaking Benjamin	EP
N O V E M B E R	23	A Sphere in the Heart of Silence	John Frusciante and Josh Klinghoffer	-
N O V E M B E R	23	Ultimate Kylie	Kylie Minogue	Compilation
N O V E M B E R	23	With the Lights Out	Nirvana	Box Set
N O V E M B E R	25	Livid	Nightmare	-
N O V E M B E R	25	The Red Jumpsuit Apparatus	The Red Jumpsuit Apparatus	-
N O V E M B E R	26	Racing	Loudness	-
N O V E M B E R	29	Downside Up	Siouxsie and the Banshees	Box Set
N O V E M B E R	29	Irish Son	Brian McFadden	Solo debut
N O V E M B E R	29	Our Last Album?	The Toy Dolls	-
N O V E M B E R	29	Platinum Collection	Genesis	Box Set
N O V E M B E R	29	Three Imaginary Boys: Deluxe Edition	The Cure	Re-issue
N O V E M B E R	30	Breakaway	Kelly Clarkson	-
N O V E M B E R	30	Collision Course	Linkin Park and Jay-Z	EP & DVD
N O V E M B E R	30	Head for the Door	The Exies	-
N O V E M B E R	30	Rebelde	RBD	Debut album
N O V E M B E R	30	Street's Disciple	Nas	-
N O V E M B E R	30	Urban Legend	T.I.	-
N O V E M B E R	?	Fluxion	The Ocean	Debut album
D E C E M B E R	6	Invisible	Nightingale	-
D E C E M B E R	7	The Dirtiest Thirstiest	Yung Wun	-
D E C E M B E R	7	Purple Haze	Cam'ron	-
D E C E M B E R	7	Speak	Lindsay Lohan	-
D E C E M B E R	7	The Red Light District	Ludacris	-
D E C E M B E R	8	Jesu	Jesu	Debut
D E C E M B E R	8	Re.	Aya Ueto	-
D E C E M B E R	9	Live from Under the Brooklyn Bridge	U2	Live EP; iTunes
D E C E M B E R	10	Almanac	They Might Be Giants	Live
D E C E M B E R	10	Artist Collection: Run DMC	Run-D.M.C.	Compilation
D E C E M B E R	10	Venue Songs	They Might Be Giants	Live
D E C E M B E R	13	Eye to the Telescope	KT Tunstall	-
D E C E M B E R	13	For You	Casey Donovan	-
D E C E M B E R	14	Concrete Rose	Ashanti	-
D E C E M B E R	14	Loyal to the Game	2Pac	-
D E C E M B E R	14	Weapons of Mass Destruction	Xzibit	-
D E C E M B E R	15	My Story	Ayumi Hamasaki	-
D E C E M B E R	21	The Mind of Mannie Fresh	Mannie Fresh	-
D E C E M B E R	22	Renai	Sid	-
D E C E M B E R	28	300 Lésions	Kyo	-
D E C E M B E R	28	Get Lifted	John Legend	-
D E C E M B E R	29	Plein d'amour: Ai ga Ippai	Kaori Iida	-
D E C E M B E R	?	Fashionista Super Dance Troupe	Help She Can't Swim	Debut
D E C E M B E R	?	Piracy Funds Terrorism	M.I.A. and Diplo	-

=== Release date unknown ===
- 5 Stories EP – Manchester Orchestra
- Gathering Speed – Big Big Train
- Get Saved – Pilot to Gunner
- Guerilla Disco – Quarashi
- Music for the New Millennium – Cindy Blackman
- Negatives – Phantom Planet
- Negatives 2 – Phantom Planet
- Oceanic Remixes/Reinterpretations – Isis
- The Pink Spiders Are Taking Over! – The Pink Spiders
- The Pirate's Gospel – Alela Diane
- Pyramid Electric Co. – Jason Molina
- Sherwood (EP) – Sherwood
- Watching the Snow – Michael Franks (United States release)
- Welcome to Woody Creek – Nitty Gritty Dirt Band

== Popular songs ==
- "1, 2 Step" – Ciara ft. Missy Elliott
- "10 A.M. Automatic" – The Black Keys
- "1985" – Bowling for Soup
- "99 Problems" – Jay-Z
- "À chaque pas" – Jonatan Cerrada
- "A Favor House Atlantic" – Coheed and Cambria
- "Accidentally in Love" – Counting Crows
- "All Falls Down" – Kanye West featuring Syleena Johnson
- "All Downhill From Here" – New Found Glory
- "All That I've Got" – The Used
- "All These Things That I've Done" – The Killers
- "Almost" – Bowling for Soup
- "Always" – Blink-182
- "Amazing" – George Michael
- "American Idiot" – Green Day
- "Amerika" – Rammstein
- "Another Planet" – Pendulum
- "Anthem of Our Dying Day" – Story of the Year
- "Baba Oje' Is The Oldest One" – Arrested Development
- "Baby It's You" – JoJo featuring Bow Wow
- "Back Up" – Pitbull
- "Balla Baby" – Chingy
- "Banzai" – B'z
- "Beautiful Soul" – Jesse McCartney
- "Because of You" – Nickelback
- "Because You Live" – Jesse McCartney
- "Before I Forget" – Slipknot
- "Black Betty" – Spiderbait
- "Bless The Broken Road" – Rascal Flatts
- "Boulevard of Broken Dreams" – Green Day
- "Breakaway" – Kelly Clarkson
- "Breakfast in Bed" – Nicole Scherzinger
- "Breaking the Habit" – Linkin Park
- "Breathe Easy" – Blue
- "Bridging the Gap" – Nas featuring Olu Dara
- "Bring 'Em Out" – T.I.
- "Broken" – Seether featuring Amy Lee
- "Bubblin'" – Blue
- "Burn" – Usher
- "Bus durch London" – Christina Stürmer
- "Butterflies and Hurricanes" – Muse
- "California Dreamin'" – Royal Gigolos
- "Call On Me" – Eric Prydz
- "(Can't Get My) Head Around You" – The Offspring
- "Caught Up" – Usher
- "Cerca de ti" – Thalía
- "Chains" – Duran Duran
- "Ch-Check It Out" – Beastie Boys
- "Club Foot" – Kasabian
- "Cold" – Crossfade
- "Come Clean" – Hilary Duff
- "Comfortably Numb" – Scissor Sisters
- "Culo" – Pitbull
- "Curtain Falls" – Blue
- "Daughters" – John Mayer
- "A Decade Under the Influence" – Taking Back Sunday
- "Despre tine" – O-Zone
- "Det gör ont" – Lena Philipsson
- "Ding Dong Song" – Günther and the Sunshine Girls
- "Dirt off Your Shoulder" – Jay-Z
- "Disco Inferno" – 50 Cent
- "Divide The Hate" – Sumbersed
- "Don't Tell Me" – Avril Lavigne
- "Down" – Blink-182
- "Dragostea Din Tei" – O-Zone
- "Drive" – Ziggy Marley
- "Drop It Like It's Hot" – Snoop Dogg featuring Pharrell Williams
- "Dry Your Eyes" – The Streets
- "Duality" – Slipknot
- "Every Breath You Take" – UB40
- "Everybody's Changing" – Keane
- "Everytime" – Britney Spears
- "Face à la mer" – Calogero and Passi
- "Feelin' Way Too Damn Good" – Nickelback
- "Femme Like U (Donne-moi ton corps)" – K.Maro
- "Figured You Out" – Nickelback
- "First" – Lindsay Lohan
- "Flap Your Wings" – Nelly
- "Flawless (Go to the City)" – George Michael
- "Float On" – Modest Mouse
- "Fly" – Hilary Duff
- "For You" – The Disco Boys
- "Força" – Nelly Furtado
- "Friday I'm in Love" – Dryden Mitchell
- "From the Inside" – Linkin Park
- "Gasolina" – Daddy Yankee
- "Getting Away with Murder" – Papa Roach
- "Ghetto" – Akon
- "The Ghost in You" – Mark McGrath
- "Girls" – The Prodigy
- "Goodies" – Ciara featuring Petey Pablo
- "Hands to Heaven" – Christian Bautista
- "Heaven" – Los Lonely Boys
- "Hey Mama" – The Black Eyed Peas
- "Hey Ya!" – OutKast
- "High" – James Blunt
- "Hitomi no Juunin" – L'Arc-en-Ciel
- "Hold Me Now" – Wayne Wonder
- "Holiday" – Green Day
- "Hollaback Girl" – Gwen Stefani
- "Hollow" – Submersed
- "Hotride" – The Prodigy
- "How We Do" – The Game
- "I Am" – Killing Heidi
- "I Believe In You" – Kylie Minogue
- "I Don't Wanna Know" – Mario Winans featuring Enya & P.Diddy
- "I Just Wanna Live" – Good Charlotte
- "I Like That" – Houston featuring Chingy, Nate Dogg and I-20
- "I Melt with You" – Jason Mraz
- "I Miss You" – Blink-182
- "I Predict a Riot" – Kaiser Chiefs
- "All Downhill From Here" – New Found Glory
- "I Wish" – Guy Sebastian
- "I'm Not Okay (I Promise)" – My Chemical Romance
- "It's My Life" – No Doubt
- "In the Middle" – Sugababes
- "In the Shadows" – The Rasmus
- "Just Be" – Tiësto
- "Just Like You" – Three Days Grace
- "Just Lose It" – Eminem
- "Kailan Pa Ma'y Ikaw" – Christian Bautista
- "Killin' Me" – Drowning Pool
- "Kryptonite" – Guy Sebastian
- "La La" – Ashlee Simpson
- "La Rivière de notre enfance" – Garou and Michel Sardou
- "Laid to Rest" – Lamb of God
- "Laissez-moi danser" – Star Academy 4
- "Last Train Home" – Lostprophets
- "Lazy Generation" – The F-Ups
- "Leave (Get Out)" – JoJo
- "Left Outside Alone" – Anastacia
- "Let Me Love You" – Mario
- "Let's Get It Started" – The Black Eyed Peas
- "Let's Get Blown" – Snoop Dogg featuring Pharrell Williams
- "Little Voice" – Hilary Duff
- "Lips Like Sugar" – Seal featuring Mikey Dread
- "Live Like You Were Dying" – Tim McGraw
- "Locked Up" – Akon
- "Lose My Breath" – Destiny's Child
- "Lovers & Friends" – Lil Jon & the East Side Boyz featuring Usher and Ludacris
- "Lovesong" – 311
- "Lying from You" – Linkin Park
- "Maps" – Yeah Yeah Yeahs
- "Meant to Live" – Switchfoot
- "Memory" – Sugarcult
- "Milkshake" – Kelis
- "Modern Times" – J-five
- "Money" – David Guetta
- "Move Ya Body" – Nina Sky
- "Mr. Brightside" – The Killers
- "Musicology" – Prince
- "My Band" – D12
- "My Boo" – Usher featuring Alicia Keys
- "My Immortal" – Evanescence
- "My Happy Ending" – Avril Lavigne
- "My Place" – Nelly featuring Jaheim
- "My Prerogative" – Britney Spears
- "My Secret Life" – Eric Burdon
- "My Spirit Will Go On" – DragonForce
- "Nasty Girl" – Nitty
- "Naughty Girl" – Beyoncé
- "Nobody's Home" – Avril Lavigne
- "Not in Love" – Enrique Iglesias featuring Kelis
- "Not Listening" – Papa Roach
- "Obsesión" – Aventura
- "Ocean Avenue" – Yellowcard
- "Oh My God" – Kaiser Chiefs
- "Oh Oh" – Guy Sebastian
- "On n'oublie jamais rien, on vit avec" – Hélène Ségara & Laura Pausini
- "On the Way Down" – Ryan Cabrera
- "One Call Away" – Chingy
- "Open Your Eyes" – Alter Bridge
- "Out with My Baby" – Guy Sebastian
- "Outrageous" – Britney Spears
- "The Outsider" – A Perfect Circle
- "Over" – Lindsay Lohan
- "Overnight Celebrity" – Twista
- "Oye Mi Canto" – N.O.R.E. featuring Nina Sky
- "Party for Two" – Shania Twain featuring Billy Currington/Mark McGrath
- "Physical" – Alcazar
- "Pieces of Me" – Ashlee Simpson
- "Poppin' Them Thangs" – G-Unit
- "Predictable" – Good Charlotte
- "Pump It Up!" – Danzel
- "Push Up" – Freestylers
- "(Reach Up for The) Sunrise" – Duran Duran
- "Real N***a Roll Call" – Lil Jon & the East Side Boyz featuring Ice Cube
- "The Reason" – Hoobastank
- "Red Blooded Woman" - Kylie Minogue
- "Redneck Woman" – Gretchen Wilson
- "Right to Be Wrong" – Joss Stone
- "Rockit" – Gorillaz
- "Rumors" – Lindsay Lohan
- "Same Direction" – Hoobastank
- "Scars" – Papa Roach
- "See You at the Show" – Nickelback
- "Shake That Bush Again" – The Mooney Suzuki
- "She Wants to Move" – N.E.R.D.
- "She Will Be Loved" – Maroon 5
- "She's No You" – Jesse McCartney
- "Shadow" – Ashlee Simpson
- "Shut Up" – The Black Eyed Peas
- "Si demain... (Turn Around)" – Bonnie Tyler and Kareen Antonn
- "Sick and Tired" - Anastacia
- "Since U Been Gone" – Kelly Clarkson (#1 on Radio Top 40 of 2005)
- "Single" – Natasha Bedingfield
- "Slash Dot Dash" – Fatboy Slim
- "Slave to Love" – Elan Atias featuring Gwen Stefani
- "Slither" – Velvet Revolver
- "Slow Jamz" – Twista featuring Jamie Foxx & Kanye West
- "Slow Motion" – Juvenile
- "So Cold" – Breaking Benjamin
- "Sobri (notre destin)" – Leslie & Amine
- "Soldier" – Destiny's Child
- "Soldiers of the Wasteland" – DragonForce
- "Solitary Man" – H.I.M.
- "Somebody Told Me" – The Killers
- "Somethin' is Goin' On" – Cliff Richard
- "Someone's Watching Over Me" – Hilary Duff
- "Somewhere Only We Know" – Keane
- "Spare Me the Details" – The Offspring
- "Stay" – David Guetta featuring Chris Willis
- "Step Up" – Drowning Pool
- "Sunshine" – Twista featuring Anthony Hamilton
- "Superstar" – Jamelia
- "Take It Away" – The Used
- "Take Me As I Am" – Seven Wiser
- "Take Me Out" – Franz Ferdinand
- "Take My Breath Away" – Jessica Simpson
- "Talk About Our Love" – Brandy featuring Kanye West
- "Thank You" – Jamelia
- "That's Nasty" – Pitbull
- "The Way You Move – OutKast featuring Sleepy Brown
- "These Words" – Natasha Bedingfield
- "Thoughts Of A Dying Atheist" – Muse
- "'Till I Get My Way"/"Girl Is on My Mind" – The Black Keys
- "Time Is Running Out" – Muse
- "Tipsy" – J-Kwon
- "Thief's Theme" – Nas
- "This Is the World We Live In" – Alcazar
- "This Love" – Maroon 5
- "Through the Wire" – Kanye West
- "Too Lost in You" – Sugababes
- "Toujours pas d'amour" – Priscilla Betti
- "Toxic" – Britney Spears
- "Trick Me" – Kelis
- "True" – Ryan Cabrera
- "True" – will.i.am & Fergie
- "Truth of My Youth" – New Found Glory
- "U Should've Known Better" – Monica
- "Unholy Confessions" – Avenged Sevenfold
- "Unwritten" – Natasha Bedingfield
- "Used to Love U" – John Legend featuring Kanye West
- "Vertigo" – U2
- "Vindicated" – Dashboard Confessional
- "Wake Me Up When September Ends" – Green Day
- "Wake Up (Make a Move)" – Lostprophets
- "Walkie Talkie Man" – Steriogram
- "Wanna Get to Know You" – G-Unit featuring Joe
- "The Way"/"Solitaire" – Clay Aiken
- "Welcome to My Life" – Simple Plan
- "We Are" – Ana Johnsson
- "We're All To Blame" – Sum 41
- "Westside Story" – The Game
- "What U Gon' Do" – Lil Jon & the Eastside Boyz featuring Lil Scrappy
- "What You Waiting For?" – Gwen Stefani
- "When You're Gone" – Richard Marx
- "Who I Am Hates Who I've Been" – Relient K
- "Who Is It" – Björk
- "Wisemen" – James Blunt
- "With You" – Jessica Simpson
- "The World is Mine" – David Guetta
- "Yeah!" – Usher featuring Lil Jon & Ludacris
- "You Had Me" – Joss Stone
- "You Won't Forget About Me" – Dannii Minogue vs. "Flower Power"
- "You're Beautiful" – James Blunt
- "Your Love" (L.O.V.E. Reggae Mix) – Wyclef Jean featuring Eve

== Top 10 selling albums of the year in the US ==
1. Confessions – Usher ~ 7,979,000
2. Feels like Home – Norah Jones ~ 3,843,000
3. Encore – Eminem ~ 3,517,000
4. When the Sun Goes Down – Kenny Chesney ~ 3,072,000
5. Under My Skin – Avril Lavigne ~ 2,970,000
6. Live Like You Were Dying – Tim McGraw ~ 2,787,000
7. Songs About Jane – Maroon 5 ~ 2,708,000
8. Fallen – Evanescence ~ 2,614,000
9. Autobiography – Ashlee Simpson ~ 2,577,000
10. Now That's What I Call Music! 16 – Various ~ 2,560,000

== Top 15 selling albums of the year globally ==
1. Confessions – Usher
2. Feels Like Home – Norah Jones
3. Encore – Eminem
4. How to Dismantle an Atomic Bomb – U2
5. Under My Skin – Avril Lavigne
6. Love. Angel. Music. Baby. – Gwen Stefani
7. Greatest Hits – Robbie Williams
8. Greatest Hits – Shania Twain
9. Destiny Fulfilled – Destiny's Child
10. Greatest Hits – Guns N' Roses
11. Songs About Jane – Maroon 5
12. American Idiot – Green Day
13. Elephunk – The Black Eyed Peas
14. Greatest Hits: My Prerogative – Britney Spears
15. Anastacia – Anastacia

== Opera ==
- Thomas Adès – The Tempest
- Harrison Birtwistle – The Io Passion
- William Bolcom – A Wedding

== Musical theater ==
- Assassins – Broadway production opened at Studio 54 and ran for 101 performances
- Bombay Dreams – Broadway production opened at The Broadway Theatre and ran for 284 performances
- Fiddler On The Roof – Broadway revival
- The Woman in White, music by Andrew Lloyd Webber, lyrics by David Zippel and book by Charlotte Jones, freely adapted from the novel by Wilkie Collins – London production opened on September 15 at the Palace Theatre, London.
- People Are Wrong! – Off-Broadway production

== Musical films ==
- Alt for Egil, starring Kristoffer Joner
- Beyond the Sea, starring Kevin Spacey as Bobby Darin
- Bride and Prejudice, starring Aishwarya Rai
- De-Lovely released June 13, starring Kevin Kline as Cole Porter and Ashley Judd
- Home on the Range, a Disney animated feature
- Ray, starring Jamie Foxx as Ray Charles
- Red Riding Hood
- Pixel Perfect, a Disney Channel Original Movie that is also a musical.
- Swing Girls
- The Phantom of the Opera, starring Emmy Rossum as Christine and Gerard Butler as the Phantom
- Metallica: Some Kind of Monster
- Where's Firuze?, starring Haluk Bilginer and Demet Akbağ

== Births ==
- January 2 – Claire Rosinkranz, American singer-songwriter
- January 3 – Abby-Lynn Keen, British singer-songwriter, Sister of RAYE
- January 4 – Alexa Curtis, Australian singer, Winner of The Voice Kids Australia, Coach was Delta Goodrem
- January 5 – 2hollis, American singer, rapper and producer
- January 10 – Kaitlyn Maher, American child singer and actress
- January 11 – Marko Bošnjak, Bosnian Croat singer-songwriter
- January 15 – Grace VanderWaal, American musician, singer/songwriter, ukulele player
- January 21 – Alex Sampson, Canadian singer-songwriter
- February 3 – Rei, Japanese singer (IVE)
- February 9 − Hannah Bahng, Australian singer
- February 10 – James Herron, American singer, dancer and member of Full Circle Boys
- February 17 - Jenna Raine, American singer-songwriter, member of L2M
- February 25 - Léo Foguete, Brazilian singer
- March 3 - Avery Anna, American country singer-songwriter
- March 12 – DannyLux, Latin-American singer-songwriter
- March 21 - Anton, South Korean singer (Riize)
- April 7 – Henry Moodie, English singer and songwriter
- April 20 – Redveil, American rapper
- May 1 – Charli D'Amelio, American media personality and dancer
- May 5 − Xavi, American singer-songwriter of regional Mexican music
- May 21 − Hudson Westbrook, American country singer-songwriter
- June 4 – Mackenzie Ziegler, American dancer, singer, actress and model
- June 5 – Iván Cornejo, American regional Mexican music singer-songwriter
- June 10 – Gayle, American singer
- June 11 - Lay Bankz, American singer and rapper
- June 14 – Soyoka Yoshida, Japanese singer
- July 1 - Daniela Avanzini, American singer, dancer, member of Katseye
- August 28 – Kano Fujihira, Japanese singer
- August 31 – Jang Won-young, South Korean singer (IVE)
- September 1 – Iam Tongi, American singer
- September 7 – Tsugumi Aritomo, Japanese singer
- September 18
  - Isabel LaRosa, Cuban-American singer, songwriter and video director
  - Toni Cornell, American singer and songwriter, daughter of Chris Cornell
- September 22 - Jessie Murph, American singer-songwriter
- October 9 – Theodor Andrei, Romanian singer
- November 21
  - Liz, South Korean singer (IVE)
  - Yvngxchris, American rapper
- December 8 – Momoe Mori, Japanese singer
- December 13 – Matt Ox, American rapper
- December 15 – quinn, American rapper
- December 16 – Ka$hdami, American rapper
- December 20 – Slump6s, American rapper

== Deaths ==
=== January–February ===
- January 3 – Ronald Smith, 82, British pianist
- January 6 – Jimmy Hassell, 62, Guitarist/co-lead singer in The First Edition from 1972 to 1976
- January 12 – Randy VanWarmer, 48, songwriter and guitarist
- January 15 – Terje Bakken, 25, also known as Valfar, lead singer and founder of Norwegian black/folk metal band Windir (died of hypothermia in a blizzard)
- January 16 – John Siomos, 56, drummer
- January 17
  - Czeslaw Niemen, 65, Polish rock singer
  - Tom Rowe, 53, musician
- January 22
  - Billy May, 87, US big band & pop music arranger
  - Ann Miller, 80, actress, singer and dancer
- January 30 – Julius Dixson, 90, songwriter and record company executive
- February 3 – Cornelius Bumpus, 58, musician (The Doobie Brothers, Steely Dan)
- February 6 – Jørgen Jersild, 90, Danish composer and music educator
- February 8 – Cem Karaca, 58, Turkish singer and composer
- February 16 – Doris Troy, 67, R&B singer
- February 21
  - Les Gray, 57, English singer (Mud)
  - Bart Howard, 88, composer and pianist
- February 23
  - Don Cornell, 84, US singer
  - Alvino Rey, 95, US bandleader and guitarist
- February 24 – A.C. Reed, 77, blues saxophonist

=== March–April ===
- March 4 – John McGeoch, 48, British guitarist with Magazine, Siouxsie and the Banshees and PiL
- March 6 – Peggy DeCastro, 82, US singer born in the Dominican Republic, eldest of the DeCastro Sisters
- March 9 – Rust Epique, 36, guitarist (Crazy Town)
- March 10 – Dave Schulthise, 47, punk bassist (The Dead Milkmen)
- March 11 – Edmund Sylvers, 47, lead singer of The Sylvers
- March 13 – Vilayat Khan, 75, sitar player
- March 15 – Eva Likova, 84, operatic soprano
- March 16 – Vilém Tauský, 93, Czech conductor and composer
- March 18
  - Vytas Brenner, 57, musician, keyboardist and composer
  - Erna Spoorenberg, 78, Dutch operatic soprano
- March 21 – Johnny Bristol, 65, singer, songwriter and record producer
- March 26 – Jan Berry, 62, US singer of Jan and Dean
- March 30 – Timi Yuro, 63, soul and R&B singer and songwriter
- April 1 – Paul Atkinson, 58, guitarist for The Zombies
- April 3 – Gabriella Ferri, 62, Italian singer
- April 6 – Niki Sullivan, 66, guitarist for The Crickets
- April 9 – Harry Babbitt, 90, US singer with Kay Kyser & his Orchestra
- April 10 – Jacek Kaczmarski, 47, Polish poet and singer, the bard of Solidarity
- April 15
  - Ray Condo, 53, Canadian rockabilly musician
  - Hans Gmür, 77, Swiss theatre author, director, composer and producer

=== May–June ===
- May 1 – Felix Haug, 52, Swiss pop musician (Double)
- May 5
  - Coxsone Dodd, 72, Jamaican record producer
  - Ritsuko Okazaki, 44, Japanese songwriter
- May 6 – Barney Kessel, 80, jazz guitarist
- May 11 – John Whitehead, 55, R&B artist (shot dead)
- May 12 – John LaPorta, 84, Jazz clarinetist, composer and educator
- May 17
  - Gunnar Graps, 52, Estonian singer (Magnetic Band and Gunnar Graps Group)
  - Elvin Jones, 76, Jazz Drummer, notably with the John Coltrane Quartet of the 1960s
- May 19 – Arnold Moore, 90, blues artist
- May 23 – Gundars Mauševics, 29, Latvian guitarist of Brainstorm
- May 31 – Robert Quine, 61, guitarist
- June 2 – Billboard, 25, rapper, The Game's best friend
- June 4 – Irene Manning, 91, US actress, singer and dancer
- June 6 – Iona Brown, 63, conductor and violinist
- June 7 – Quorthon, 38, Swedish multi-instrumentalist, founder and songwriter of Bathory
- June 10 – Ray Charles, 73, US singer and pianist
- June 15 – James F. Arnold, 72, first tenor with the Four Lads
- June 17 – Jackie Paris, 77, US jazz singer
- June 27 – Sis Cunningham, 95, folk musician

=== July–August ===
- July 1 – Todor Skalovski, 95, Macedonian composer
- July 6 – Syreeta Wright, 57, singer (congestive heart failure, a side effect of cancer treatment)
- July 13
  - Arthur Kane, 55, bassist (New York Dolls)
  - Carlos Kleiber, 74, conductor
- July 21 – Jerry Goldsmith, 75, US composer, Academy Award winner
- July 22
  - Illinois Jacquet, 81, US jazz saxophonist
  - Sacha Distel, 71, French singer
- August 2 – Don Tosti, 81, American composer
- August 6
  - Rick James, 56, US funk singer
  - Argentino Ledesma, 75, Argentinian singer
  - Tony Mottola, 86, US Guitarist
- August 9 – David Raksin, 92, US composer
- August 15 – William Herbert York, 85, bassist for Drifting Cowboys
- August 17 – Bernard Odum, 72, bass player for James Brown
- August 18 – Elmer Bernstein, 82, US composer
- August 20 – María Antonieta Pons, 82, Cuban Rumbera
- August 26 – Laura Branigan, 52, US singer (brain aneurysm)
- August 31 – Carl Wayne, 61, vocalist (The Move)

=== September–October ===
- September 2
  - Michael Connor, 54, American country rock keyboardist (Pure Prairie League)
  - Billy Davis
- September 11 – Juraj Beneš, 64, Slovak composer
- September 12
  - John Buller, 77, British composer
  - Kenny Buttrey, 59, Nashville session drummer
  - Fred Ebb, 72, US lyricist
- September 15 – Johnny Ramone, 55, US guitarist and founding member of The Ramones (prostate cancer)
- September 16 – Izora Armstead, 62, member of The Weather Girls
- September 19 - Skeeter Davis, 72, singer
- September 29 – Heinz Wallberg, 81, German conductor
- September 30 – Jacques Levy, 69, songwriter and theatre director
- October 1 – Bruce Palmer, 58, bassist of Buffalo Springfield
- October 7 – Miki Matsubara, 44, Japanese composer and singer
- October 19 – Greg Shaw, 55, music historian and record label owner
- October 25 – John Peel, 65, British DJ and broadcaster (heart attack)
- October 28 – Gil Melle, 72, film and television music composer

=== November–December ===
- November 1
  - Mac Dre, 34, Bay Area rapper (highway shooting)
  - Terry Knight, 61, lead singer of Terry Knight and the Pack and manager-producer of Grand Funk Railroad(stabbed in domestic dispute)
- November 12 – Usko Meriläinen, 74, Finnish composer
- November 13
  - John Balance, 42, British musician from Coil
  - Ol' Dirty Bastard, 35, African American rapper (drug overdose)
  - Carlo Rustichelli, 87, Italian film composer
- November 14 – Michel Colombier, 65, composer
- November 18 – Cy Coleman, 75, US composer
- November 19 – Terry Melcher, 62, musician and producer
- November 24 – James Wong Jim, 63, Cantopop lyricist and songwriter
- December 1 – Norman Newell, 85, English record producer and lyricist
- December 2 – Kevin Coyne, 60, singer, composer and guitarist
- December 4 - Willem Duyn, 67, singer of Mouth and MacNeal
- December 5 – Bill Maybray, 60, lead singer of The Jaggerz (cancer)
- December 8 – Dimebag Darrell, 38, former Pantera guitarist (shot to death in Ohio)
- December 13 – Alex Soria, 39, guitarist for The Nils (suicide)
- December 14 – Sidonie Goossens, 105, harpist
- December 16 -Freddie Perren, 61, songwriter, producer, arranger and conductor
- December 19 – Renata Tebaldi, 82, operatic soprano
- December 20 – Son Seals, 62, blues musician
- December 26 – Sigurd Køhn, 45, Norwegian jazz saxophonist (tsunami)
- December 27 – Hank Garland, 74, Nashville session guitarist
- December 30 – Artie Shaw, 94, Swing Era Clarinetist and Bandleader

== Awards ==
The following artists were inducted into the Rock and Roll Hall of Fame: Jackson Browne, The Dells, George Harrison, Prince, Bob Seger, Traffic, ZZ Top.

=== ARIA Music Awards ===
- ARIA Music Awards of 2004

=== BRIT Awards ===
- 2004 BRIT Awards

=== Country Music Association Awards ===
- 2004 Country Music Association Awards

=== Eurovision Song Contest ===
- Eurovision Song Contest 2004
- Junior Eurovision Song Contest 2004

=== Grammy Awards ===
- Grammy Awards of 2004

=== Juno Awards ===
- Juno Awards of 2004

=== MTV Video Music Awards ===
- 2004 MTV Video Music Awards

== Charts ==
=== Triple J Hottest 100 ===
- Triple J Hottest 100, 2004

== See also ==
- 2004 in music (UK)
- Record labels established in 2004
