= Ace Troubleshooter (album) =

Studio album by Ace Troubleshooter
- Released: August 10, 2000
- Recorded: The Blasting Room, Fort Collins, Colorado in March 2000
- Genre: Pop punk
- Length: 39:39
- Label: BEC
- Producer: Brandon Ebel

Ace Troubleshooter chronology
| Don't Stop a Rockin' (1999) | Ace Troubleshooter (2000) | The Madness of the Crowds (2002) |

Professional ratings
Review scores
| Source | Rating |
|---|---|
| Allmusic | 2/5 stars |
| Jesus Freak Hideout | 3/5 stars |

Ace Troubleshooter is the third studio album by American pop punk band Ace Troubleshooter and their debut on BEC. The songs "Misconceptions", "I Corinthians 13", "Don't Trust That Girl", and "Fortess" all appeared earlier on the band's second album, Don't Stop a Rockin'. The versions of these songs on this album are all re-recorded. The album was recorded at the Blasting Room with Bill Stevenson and Stephen Egerton of Descendents/All.

== Track listing ==
All songs written by John Warne

1. "SE #101" - 3:10
2. "Denise" - 4:15
3. "Tonight" - 4:26
4. "Misconceptions" - 3:33
5. "My Way" - 2:23
6. "Yesterday" - 3:37
7. "I Corinthians 13" - 3:05
8. "Don't Trust That Girl" - 3:16
9. "Phoenix" - 4:23
10. "Yoko" - 3:14
11. "Fortress" - 4:15
