= Kool Keith Presents Thee Undatakerz =

Studio album by Thee Undatakerz
- Released: May 11, 2004
- Recorded: 2003–2004
- Genre: Hip-hop
- Length: 69:01
- Label: Activate Entertainment
- Producer: Havoc Razor; Kool Keith; Money D

Kool Keith chronology
Game (2002)	Kool Keith Presents Thee Undatakerz (2004)	Diesel Truckers (2004)

Singles from Kool Keith Presents Thee Undatakerz
- 1. "Party In Tha Morgue" Released: 2003

Professional ratings
Review scores
Source	Rating
AllMusic	2/5 stars
RapReviews	5.5/10
The New Rolling Stone Album Guide	3.5/5 stars

Kool Keith Presents Thee Undatakerz is the only studio album by American hip-hop group Thee Undatakerz. It was released on May 11, 2004, via Activate Entertainment and was produced by the group's founder, Kool Keith, as well as Havoc Razor and Money D. The album was released in CS2CD format meaning it played both CD audio and DVD video. The album featured one single release, "Party in tha Morgue", which was featured in Blade: Trinity (soundtrack) in remixed form. Neither the single nor the album made it to any major charts.

== Track listing ==
No.	Title	Length
1.	"CS2CD"	0:06
2.	"Reverand Tom"	4:35
3.	"Party in tha Morgue"	3:34
4.	"Midnite Madness"	3:22
5.	"Dark Space"	4:53
6.	"The Funeral Director"	3:46
7.	"10 - 8 = Not a Dime"	2:52
8.	"Morgue"	3:30
9.	"Help Me... Praise the Lord"	4:01
10.	"Dark Road"	4:11
11.	"The Flesh, Feed Me"	3:42
12.	"Grave Undataking"	4:08
13.	"For Whom the Bells Toll"	3:59
14.	"6 Feet Unda"	3:38
15.	"The Hearse"	4:23
16.	"Party in tha Morgue (Club Mix) / We Showed Up / Party in tha Morgue (Acapella)"	14:21
Total length:		1:09:01
