= The Madness of the Crowds =

Studio album by Ace Troubleshooter
- Released: June 5, 2002
- Studio: The Loft Studio
- Genre: Pop punk
- Length: 40:39
- Label: Tooth & Nail
- Producer: Tim Patalan

Ace Troubleshooter chronology
Ace Troubleshooter (2000)	The Madness of the Crowds (2002)	It's Never Enough (2004)

Professional ratings
Review scores
Source	Rating
AllMusic	3/5 stars
Cross Rhythms	9/10 stars
Jesus Freak Hideout	4/5 stars

The Madness of the Crowds is the fourth studio album by American pop punk band Ace Troubleshooter but their first on BEC's parent company, Tooth & Nail Records. It was released on June 5, 2002 in the UK and June 18 on the US.

The album's title is derived from Extraordinary Popular Delusions and the Madness of Crowds, a book by Charles Mackay. The album was recorded at The Loft with Tim Patalan.

== Track listing ==
All songs written by John Warne, except track 3, written by John Warne, Ben Dewey & Joshua Abbott

1. "The Madness of the Crowd" – 3:21
2. "2:00 Your Time" – 3:19
3. "Have It All" – 5:16
4. "Amanda" – 2:26
5. "Age of Gold" – 3:24
6. "Estella" – 4:54
7. "Out to Sea" – 2:56
8. "But for Grace" – 2:37
9. "Let's Go Away" – 3:39
10. "Numinous" – 4:38
11. "Your Reach" – 4:09
