= Maximum XS: The Essential Nazareth =

Maximum XS

Greatest hits album by Nazareth
- Released: 12 June 2004
- Genre: Hard rock
- Label: Metro Doubles
- Producer: Roger Glover, Jeff Baxter, John Punter, John Eden, Manny Charlton

Nazareth chronology
| Alive & Kicking (2003) | Maximum XS (2004) | Live in Brazil (2007) |

Maximum XS is a greatest hits album by the Scottish hard rock group Nazareth, released in 2004. Most of the songs are alternate or live versions that do not appear on other albums. Such as "Razamanaz" an alternate edit of the song. "Shapes of Things" a song originally by the English rock group the Yardbirds. "Hair of the Dog" is a (Single edit) and one of Nazareth's biggest hits, as well as Love Hurts an Everly Brothers cover, rock orchestra version.

== Notes ==
All tracks licensed courtesy of Eagle Rock Entertainment plc. Issued in a slimline double jewelcase with eight page booklet and a cardboard card.

38 tracks of Nazareth's songs, with a number of edits, US mixes, and rare versions of the band's best recordings. Includes detailed band history and track-by-track notes by band members.

== Track listing ==
=== Disc 1 ===
1. "Razamanaz" (Alternate edit)
2. "Broken Down Angel"
3. "Turn on Your Receiver"
4. "Shapes of Things" (Single edit)
5. "Hair of the Dog" (Single edit)
6. "Love Hurts"
7. "Telegram" (Edited version)
8. "I Want To (Do Everything for You)"
9. "Expect No Mercy" (live)
10. "Star"
11. "Big Boy"
12. "Pop the Silo"
13. "Boys in the Band"
14. "This Month's Messiah"
15. "Hit the Fan"
16. "Piece of My Heart"
17. "Every Time It Rains"
18. "When the Lights Come Down" (Live)
19. "Walk by Yourself"

=== Disc 2 ===
1. "Morning Dew" (alternate edited version)
2. "This Flight Tonight" (US version)
3. "Shanghai'd in Shanghai" (US single edit)
4. "Holy Roller" (alternate mix)
5. "My White Bicycle" (original single version)
6. "Carry Out Feelings" (US single edit)
7. "I Don't Want To Go on Without You" (alternate edit)
8. "Place in Your Heart" (alternate edited version)
9. "May the Sunshine" (single edit)
10. "Holiday" (single edit)
11. "Dressed to Kill" (single edit)
12. "Dream On" (single edit)
13. "Where Are You Now" (alternate edit)
14. "Ruby Tuesday" (The Rolling Stones cover) (extended single mix)
15. "Cinema" (edited version)
16. "Hang on to a Dream" (single edit)
17. "Hire and Fire" (edited version)
18. "Let Me Be Your Dog" (edited version)
19. "Love Hurts" (rock orchestra version)

== Personnel ==
Nazareth

- Pete Agnew – Bass, Backing Vocal, Piano
- Darrell Sweet – Drums, Percussion, Backing Vocals
- Pete York - Tambourine
- Billy Rankin – Guitar
- Jimmy Murrison – Guitar
- Manny Charlton – Banjo, Backing Vocals, Electric Guitar, Slide Guitar, Acoustic Guitar
- Zal Cleminson – Guitar, Synthesizer
- John Locke – Keyboards
- Ronnie Leahy – Keyboards
- Dan McCafferty – Lead Vocals
