= Alive & Kicking (Nazareth album) =

Live album by Nazareth
- Released: 18 November 2003
- Genre: Hard rock
- Length: 41:48
- Label: Direct Source

Nazareth chronology
Homecoming (2002)	Alive & Kicking (2003)	Maximum XS: The Essential Nazareth (2004)

Professional ratings
Review scores
Source	Rating
Allmusic	2/5 stars

Alive & Kicking is a live album by the Scottish hard rock band Nazareth, released in 2003. It is an edited-down version of the concert previously released as Homecoming
(2002).

== Track listing ==
All lyrics are written by Manny Charlton, Dan McCafferty, Pete Agnew, Darrell Sweet unless otherwise noted

No.	Title	Writer(s)	Length
1.	"When the Lights Come Down"	Agnew, Leahy, McCafferty, Murrison, Sweet	3:13
2.	"Razamanaz"		4:45
3.	"Miss Misery"		4:48
4.	"Broken Down Angel"		4:32
5.	"Love Hurts"	Bryant	4:38
6.	"Whiskey Drinkin' Woman"		4:40
7.	"Bad Bad Boy"		3:59
8.	"My White Bicycle"	Burgess, Hopkins	3:16
9.	"Beggars Day"	Niles Lofgren	3:52

== Personnel ==
- Pete Agnew – bass guitar
- Dan McCafferty – vocals
- Jimmy Murrison – guitar
- Lee Agnew – drums
- Ronnie Leahy – keyboards
