= Games at High Speeds =

Studio album by Pilot to Gunner
- Released: April 17, 2001
- Studio: Fort Apache
- Genre: Indie rock, post-hardcore
- Label: Gern Blandsten

Pilot to Gunner chronology
Hit the Ground and Hum (2000)	Games at High Speeds (2001)	Get Saved (2004)

Professional ratings
Review scores
Source	Rating
AllMusic	3.5/5 stars
The Encyclopedia of Popular Music	4/5 stars
Pitchfork	7.7/10
Uncut	1/5 stars

Games at High Speeds is the first full-length album by Pilot to Gunner, released in 2001. It was re-released in 2003.

== Critical reception ==
Uncut wrote that "for all their complexities, Pilot To Gunner repeat their explosive shifts too often." AllMusic wrote that the album "ultimately isn't a surprising reinvention of the wheel and gets a touch samey towards the end, but it still makes a fine first album from a band that shows some distinct promise." CMJ New Music Monthly called it "a riveting and raucous jaunt that begs repeatedly listening."

== Track listing ==
1. Every Minute Is a Movie (3:34)
2. We Got Games at High Speeds (2:44)
3. Action Items (2:43)
4. Zero Return (3:12)
5. Put It in the Post (2:37)
6. It's So Good to Be Here in Paris (4:09)
7. Bring It Live (2:54)
8. Believer Receiver (2:52)
9. Band Finale (3:13)
10. The Lurid Loop's Dead (3:59)
11. Run Interference (3:54)

== LP version ==
Pilot to Gunner released the album on vinyl in 2006. The only difference is the removal of the song "Action Items."
