= Pilot to Gunner =

- Origin: Brooklyn, New York City, United States
- Genres: Indie rock, post-punk revival, post-hardcore
- Years active: 1998–present
- Labels: Arena Rock Recording Co.
- Members: Scott V. Padden; Patrick Hegarty; Martin McLoughlin; Kurt L. Herrmann
- Website: Biography

Pilot to Gunner is an American indie/post-punk revival band, which was formed in New York City around 1998. Led by the vocals and guitar of Scott V. Padden, Pilot to Gunner also includes guitarist Patrick Hegarty, bassist Martin McLoughlin, and drummer Kurt L. Herrman. The boys debuted on wax in 1999 with the Hit the Ground and Hum EP for "Me Too!"; that led to the 2001 Gern Blandsten full-length Games at High Speeds. A deal with the Arena Rock Recording Co., which reissued Games at High Speeds with an additional bonus track in early 2003. Games at High Speeds was also picked up by Rykodisc in Europe, and Building Records in Australia. Get Saved was recorded in 2003 with J. Robbins and released in 2004 by ARRCO in the US, Rykodisc in Europe, and Building Records in Australia.

The band's third album Guilty Guilty was released in 2012.

== Members ==
=== Current ===
- Scott V. Padden - lead vocals (1998–present)
- Patrick Hegarty - guitar (1998–present)
- Martin McLoughlin - bass guitar (1998–present)
- Kurt L. Herrmann - drums (1998–present)

== Discography ==
=== Studio albums ===
- Games at High Speeds (2001)
- Get Saved (2004)
- Guilty Guilty (2012)
- Hail Hallucinator (2022)

=== EPs ===
- Hit the Ground and Hum (2000)

== Non-album songs ==
• 68 - Released on Until the Shaking Stops - A Salute to Jawbox

== Appearances ==
The song Barrio Superstarrio was featured on Rockstar game Midnight Club 3
