= Get Saved =

Studio album by Pilot to Gunner
- Released: 2004
- Genre: Indie rock; post-hardcore
- Length: 37:30
- Label: Arena Rock
- Producer: J. Robbins

Pilot to Gunner chronology
Games at High Speeds (2003)	Get Saved (2004)

Professional ratings
Review scores
Source	Rating
AllMusic	4/5 stars
Pitchfork	7.3/10.0

Get Saved is the second full-length album of Pilot to Gunner.

== Track listing ==
1. "Get Saved" (3:46)
2. "Metropolitans" (2:35)
3. "The Product" (3:06)
4. "Hey Carrier" (3:43)
5. "Sorry Names" (4:03)
6. "Barrio Superstarrio" (2:55)
7. "No-Blooded" (3:48)
8. "Hot Circuitry" (2:40)
9. "Downstate" (3:56)
10. "Dry Ice & Strobe Lights" (3:51)
11. "Sound Recovery" (3:07)
