= The Blind Watchmaker (album) =

Studio album by Mana ERG
- Released: 15 June 2004
- Recorded: XBDA Studio, West Sussex, UK
- Genre: Experimental, ambient, techno, electro, industrial
- Length: 50:03
- Label: Glyptique
- Producer: Bruno De Angelis

Mana ERG chronology
Borderliners (2002)	The Blind Watchmaker (2004)	Red Dust (2006)

The Blind Watchmaker is an album by Mana ERG, released on 15 June 2004. It builds on Mana ERG's ideas of coalescing forms of techno, drum 'n' bass, experimental and electronic ambient into a collage of modern music. Produced and recorded by Bruno de Angelis, contributors to the CD include Joe Erber (piano / guitar), Tiberio (guitars), and Lee Stacey (drum loops). Guest contributors who did some electronic arranging for The Blind Watchmaker include Russian composer Artemiy Artemiev and contemporary electronic creator Dieter Moebius (originally with the band Kluster).

== Track listing ==
All tracks are written by Bruno De Angelis.

No.	Title	Length
1.	"Bother"	4:53
2.	"Wasps"	5:05
3.	"The Lynx"	4:33
4.	"Cunctis Diebus"	5:25
5.	"Angel of Chaos"	5:50
6.	"Target"	5:24
7.	"Novi Mir"	5:35
8.	"Burning Fields" (Instrumental)	4:29
9.	"Children of the Rubble"	5:05
10.	"[Untitled Track]"	3:40

== Personnel ==
- Bruno De Angelis - Writer / Recording / Producer / Programming / Vocals / Keys / Guitar
- Martin Bowes - Mastering
- Artemiy Artemiev - Composition
- Deborah Roberts - Vocals
- Tiberio - Guitars
- Joe Erber - Piano
- Antonym - Loops sources
- Nihm - Didgeridoo / Synth
- Dieter Moebius - Synths
- Lee Stacey - Drum Programming
