= The Artist Collection: Busta Rhymes =

Compilation album by Busta Rhymes
- Released: October 12, 2004
- Recorded: 2001–2003
- Genre: Hip hop
- Label: BMG International
- Producer: Busta Rhymes, The Neptunes, J Dilla, Just Blaze, Rick Rock, Dr. Dre, Wild Style, True Master, Yogi

Busta Rhymes chronology
It Ain't Safe No More (2002)	The Artist Collection: Busta Rhymes (2004)	The Big Bang (2006)

The Artist Collection is a compilation album by rapper Busta Rhymes released on October 12, 2004.

== Track listing ==
No.	Title	Length
1.	"Break Ya Neck"
2.	"Make It Clap"
3.	"Pass the Courvoisier, pt. 2"
4.	"Call the Ambulance (featuring Rampage)"
5.	"It Ain't Safe No More..."
6.	"Everybody Rise Again"
7.	"Till It's Gone"
8.	"Match the Name With the Voice"
9.	"Light Your Ass on Fire"
10.	"Turn Me Up Some"
11.	"Betta Stay Up in Your House"
12.	"What It Is?"
13.	"Hey Ladies"
