= Ace Troubleshooter =

American pop punk band (1995–2005)

- Origin: Plymouth, Minnesota, United States
- Genres: Pop punk
- Years active: 1995–2005
- Label: Tooth & Nail
- Past members: John Warne; Toby David; Joe Krube; Josh Abbott aka Fatboy; Ben Dewey; Jimmy Taylor; Isaac Deaton; Dave Douglas; Matt Pacyga; Cody Oaks

Ace Troubleshooter, often shortened to Ace, was an American pop punk band. Formed in December 1995 in Minneapolis, Minnesota, they released five albums through Tooth & Nail Records.

== Background ==
Formed in Minneapolis, Minnesota, the band gained attention in 1996 by winning a national battle of the bands competition, sponsored by Sam Goody. Warne came up with the band's name after reading the phrase, ace troubleshooter, in a history book.

The Ace Troubleshooter lineup changed several times, they started as a three-piece: John Warne, Josh Abbott and Matt Pacyga. They added Isaac Deaton as the second guitarist in 1998. Only two original members, John Warne and Josh Abbott, remained when the band came to an end. They had both played in the short-lived band Guerilla Rodeo shortly before Ace disbanded.

Relient K was often known as the "brother band" to Ace Troubleshooter. The two bands performed multiple tours together, and the members were all friends with each other. Dave Douglas, the drummer for Relient K, filled-in as a guitarist for a short time. Warne filled in as bassist for Relient K when Brian Pittman first left. Relient K's Matt Thiessen said in 2000 that they were allowed by Ace to live on their bus, as Relient K was just starting out.

In February 2005 Toby David posted the announcement of the band's breakup on their message board. Warne left to play bass guitar for Relient K. Abbott went on to play for My Red Hot Nightmare.

== Members ==
Final line-up

- John Warne – lead vocals, guitar (1995–2005)
- Josh Abbott – drums (1997–2005)
- Toby David – guitar (2003–2005)
- Joe Krube – bass guitar, backing vocals (2003–2005)

Former members

- Matt Pacyga – bass guitar (1997–1999)
- Cody Oaks – bass guitar (1999–2001)
- Isaac Deaton – guitar, backing vocals (1998–2003)
- Dave Douglas – guitar, backing vocals (2001)
- Jimmy Taylor – guitar (2001)
- Ben Dewey – bass (2001–2003)

== Discography ==
- Back in the Shootin' Match (1996)
- Don't Stop a Rockin' (1999)
- Ace Troubleshooter (2000)
- The Madness of the Crowds (2002)
- It's Never Enough (2004)
