= Shanghai'd in Shanghai =

- Side 1 of the German vinyl

Single by Nazareth

from the album Rampant
- B-side: "Love, Now You're Gone"
- Released: March 1974
- Genre: Hard rock
- Label: Mooncrest
- Songwriters: McCafferty, Sweet, Agnew, Charlton
- Producer: Roger Glover

Nazareth singles chronology
"This Flight Tonight" (1973)	"Shanghai'd in Shanghai" (1974)	"My White Bicycle" (1975)

"Shanghai'd in Shanghai" is a song and single recorded by Scottish rock band Nazareth and released on the studio album Rampant in 1974.

== Background and chart success ==
It was taken from their 1974 album Rampant. The song paired with "Love, Now You're Gone" was the fourth of eleven of Nazareth's singles to chart in the UK. It reached 41 in the UK Singles Chart in 1974 staying for four weeks. The single fared better in Austria (number seven) and Switzerland, where it peaked at number four.

Donald A. Guarisco of Allmusic describes the song as "plenty of energy, building from verses with a bluesy swing into a throbbing sing-along chorus that any glam band of 1970s would have killed for". Manny Charlton provided power chords which combined with Dan McCafferty's "gritty" lead vocal.

The song was a radio favourite and also a favourite with fans of the group.

== Credits ==
- Dan McCafferty - vocals
- Pete Agnew - bass guitar, guitar, background vocals
- Manny Charlton - guitars, producer
- Darrell Sweet - drums, background vocals

Additional musicians

- Jon Lord - piano
- Vicki Brown, Barry St. John, Liza Strike - background vocals

== Charts ==
Chart (1974)	Peak position
Austria (Ö3 Austria Top 40)	7
Germany (GfK)	14
Switzerland (Schweizer Hitparade)	4
UK Singles (OCC)	41
