= Digby (band) =

American power pop band

- Origin: Louisville, Kentucky, U.S.
- Genres: Power pop
- Years active: 2000–2009; 2024–present
- Labels: Toucan Cove, Label X
- Members: Paul Moeller; Rich Oeffinger; Ben Schneider; Mark Book; John Shiner
- Website: digbytheband.com

Digby is an American power pop band formed in 2000 in Louisville, Kentucky. The band is fairly popular within the city and surrounding area.

== History ==
Formerly known as 100 Acre Wood, the band in 1999, due to changing personnel and their musical genre, chose the name Digby, which they saw imprinted on a truck on the way to a gig in Bowling Green, Kentucky. Their new name went into effect with their first official album release in January 2000, the self-produced and financed Laughing at the Trees.

The band followed up Laughing at the Trees with Go Digby (Label X) in 2003. Then on June 1, 2004, they released their most notable album to date, Falling Up (Toucan Cove/Label X), their first release to be distributed nationally. This album contained music from Go Digby as well as five new tunes. Falling Up as well as Go Digby were produced by Todd Smith, who had previously worked with fellow Louisville band Days of the New as well as Smash Mouth. Falling Up debuted at #1 on the ear X-tacy sales chart. "Keep Your Distance", a song off the album, was used for the title track of Stu Pollard's 2005 film of the same name.

After Falling Up, the band endured an unsuccessful tour, personal travails, and departures, but eventually wound up back in a studio above a funeral home in 2006 to record new music. This effort produced the 5-song EP What's Not Plastic? (Toucan Cove), released in 2007.

Digby reemerged in 2024 with the February 14 release of the single, "Love Is Love", and the March 1 release of their first full album in 17 years, Happy Little Heartache.

== Members ==
Band members since 2000 include:

- Paul Moeller – lead vocals, rhythm guitar
- Rich Oeffinger – lead guitar, backing vocals
- Ben Schneider – bass guitar, backing vocals
- Mark Book – drums, backing vocals
- John Shiner – keyboards, backing vocals

== Discography ==
=== Albums ===
- Laughing at the Trees (self-released, 2000)
- Go Digby (2003)
- Falling Up (2004)
- Happy Little Heartache (self-released, 2024)

=== EPs ===
- Falling Over: The Remix EP (2005)
- What's Not Plastic? (2007)
- The Complicated Futility (self-released, 2009)
- A Quick Fix for A Horrible Dilemma (self-released, 2009)
