= Mana ERG =

Mana ERG was the musical project of ex recording engineer and multi-instrumentalist Bruno De Angelis. Born in Rome and grown up in London, he gained experience by recording and producing bands playing very different genres. This had a direct influence on his music, a genre-defying blend of industrial, ethereal, ebm, electronica, and rock elements. Bruno's closest collaborators, who also assisted him in the production, were Joe Erber (piano and keyboards) and Tiberio (guitars), but quite often they were joined by special guests such as soprano Deborah Roberts, who, with her crystal clear and yet warm vocals, added an ethereal and dream-like touch to the sound. Other notable friends and collaborators were sound manipulator Antonym, Russian composer Artemiy Artemiev, Dieter Moebius, and Attrition's mastermind Martin Bowes. The band has not released any official albums since 2011, but a new album on the XBDA label is scheduled for 2026.

== Discography ==
- Another (1999)
- Borderliners (2002)
- The Blind Watchmaker (2004)
- Red Dust (2006)
- Idiosyncratic (2011)

== See also ==
- List of ambient music artists
