= The Frustrated =

Studio album by Glay
- Released: March 24, 2004
- Genre: Pop rock, power pop
- Label: Toshiba EMI
- Producer: Glay

Glay chronology
Glay Rare Collectives Vol. 1 and 2 (2003)	The Frustrated (2004)	Ballad Best Singles: White Road (2005)

Singles from The Frustrated
- 1. "Beautiful Dreamer/Street Life" Released: October 10, 2003; 2. "Toki no Shizuku" Released: January 1, 2004

The Frustrated is the ninth album by Japanese rock band Glay. It was released on March 24, 2004, and peaked at #2 at Oricon charts, with 241,485 copies sold. It was certified Platinum by the Recording Industry Association of Japan (RIAJ).

== Track listing ==
1. Highcommunications - 4:13
2. The Frustrated - 3:47
3. All I Want - 4:30
4. Beautiful Dreamer - 4:30
5. Blast - 4:23
6. Ano Natsu Kara Ichiban Tooi Basho (あの夏から一番遠い場所) - 5:41
7. Mugen no déjà vu Kara (無限のdéjà vuから) - 4:18
8. Toki no Shizuku (時の雫) - 7:23
9. Billionaire Champagne Miles Away - 3:38
10. Coyote, Colored Darkness - 3:36
11. Bugs in My Head - 3:43
12. Runaway Runaway - 4:11
13. Street Life - 5:43
14. Minamigochi (南東風（みなみごち）) - 5:20
