= It's Never Enough =

Studio album by Ace Troubleshooter
- Released: March 23, 2004
- Genre: Pop punk
- Length: 39:04
- Label: Tooth & Nail
- Producer: Tim Patalan

Ace Troubleshooter chronology
The Madness of the Crowds (2002)	It's Never Enough (2004)

Professional ratings
Review scores
Source	Rating
AllMusic	2.5/5 stars
Cross Rhythms	8/10 stars
Jesus Freak Hideout	4/5 stars

It's Never Enough is the fifth and final studio album by American pop punk band Ace Troubleshooter, recorded once more with Tim Patalan at The Loft.

== Track listing ==
1. "Ball & Chain"
2. "Anything"
3. "Jasmine"
4. "Make It Right"
5. "Seaside"
6. "Turn Round"
7. "My Defense"
8. "Helen Burns"
9. "Tempest"
10. "Hoping"
11. "Don't Do It Again"
12. "So Long"
