= Blade: Trinity (soundtrack) =

Blade: Trinity (Original Motion Picture Soundtrack)

Soundtrack album by various artists
- Released: November 23, 2004
- Recorded: 2000–04
- Genres: Big beat; hip hop; rock; electronic music
- Length: 49:54
- Label: New Line Records
- Producers: George Drakoulias (exec.); Wesley Snipes (exec.); RZA; Ramin Djawadi; Andy Ellis; Danny Saber

Professional ratings
Review scores
Source	Rating
AllMusic	3.5/5 stars

Blade: Trinity (Original Motion Picture Soundtrack) is the soundtrack to David S. Goyer's 2004 film Blade: Trinity. It was released on November 23, 2004 via New Line Records, serving as a follow-up to Blade II: The Soundtrack. Composed of a mix of hip hop and electronic music, it consists of twelve songs, and features contributions by the likes of Wu-Tang Clan members and affiliates, Black Lab, E-40, Lil' Flip, Overseer, Paris Texas, The Crystal Method, Thee Undatakerz and WC. Production was handled by RZA, Ramin Djawadi, Andy Ellis and Danny Saber, with executive producers George Drakoulias and Wesley Snipes.

The album proved to be the least successful of the three Blade soundtracks, peaking at number 68 on the Top R&B/Hip-Hop Albums, number 15 on the Top Soundtracks and number eight on the Independent Albums.

== Versions ==
There are three different versions of the soundtrack: the clean version, the uncensored version, and the deluxe version. The deluxe version includes a 12-page comic by Takashi Okazaki and a bonus DVD featuring an animated short, a story board animatic, making-of footage, character designs, Blade Manga art, a weapons gallery, behind-the-scenes footage of the RZA scoring the film, and more. The song "Starting Over" by The Crystal Method was also used in the film, though it is not on the soundtrack.

== Track listing ==
No.	Title	Writer(s)	Producer(s)	Length
1.	"Fatal" (performed by RZA)	R. Diggs; L. Reed	RZA	3:43
2.	"I Gotta Get Paid" (performed by Lil' Flip, Ghostface Killah and Raekwon)	W. Weston; D. Coles; C. Woods; R. Diggs	RZA	3:49
3.	"When the Guns Come Out" (performed by WC, E-40 and Christ Bearer)	W. Calhoun; E. Stevens; A. Johnson; N. Greenaway; R. Diggs	RZA	4:09
4.	"Thirsty" (performed by Ol' Dirty Bastard and Black Keith)	K. Robinson; R. Diggs	RZA	4:04
5.	"Daywalkers" (performed by RZA and Ramin Djawadi)	R. Djawadi; R. Diggs	Ramin Djawadi; RZA	2:34
6.	"Party in tha Morgue (Club Mix)" (performed by Kool Keith and Thee Undatakerz)	A. Agcoalil; D. Roberts; K. Jefferies; K. Thornton; D. Merlot		6:56
7.	"Skylight" (performed by Overseer)	R. Howes		4:59
8.	"This Blood" (performed by Black Lab)	P. Durham; A. Ellis	Andy Ellis	3:06
9.	"Bombs Away (Danny Saber Remix)" (performed by Paris Texas)	S. Sherpe; N. Treolo; N. Zinkgraf; M. Tennessen; S. Vinz	Danny Saber	3:28
10.	"Weapons of Mass Distortion" (performed by The Crystal Method)	S. Kirkland; K. Jordan; Y. Seino		4:50
11.	"Hard Wax" (performed by Manchild)	B. Parker; M. Odell; M. Williams		4:08
12.	"Blade's Back" (performed by Ramin Djawadi)	R. Djawadi	Ramin Djawadi	4:03
Total length:				49:54

== Charts ==
Chart (2004–05)	Peak position
Austrian Albums (Ö3 Austria)	28
German Albums (Offizielle Top 100)	54
