= Thee Undatakerz =

American hip-hop group

Background information
- Also known as: Tha Takerz; Tha Livin' Dead
- Origin: The Bronx, New York
- Genres: Hip-hop
- Years active: 2003–2004
- Labels: Activate Entertainment; New Line Records
- Members: Reverend Tom; Al Bury-U (a.k.a. BIG NONAME); M-Balmer; The Funeral Director

Thee Undatakerz were an American hip-hop group composed of Reverend Tom (Kool Keith), Al Bury-U (BIG NONAME), M-Balmer and The Funeral Director. They were signed to Activate Entertainment.

== History ==
The group was formed by Kool Keith in 2003 with members Al Bury-U (a.k.a. BIGNONAME), M-Balmer and The Funeral Director as well as Kool Keith himself, who adopted the persona of Reverend Tom. The group released their debut album, Kool Keith Presents Thee Undatakerz on May 11, 2004. The album was not a huge commercial success but did feature the semi-successful single, "Party in tha Morgue", which would later appear on the soundtrack for Blade: Trinity. Kool Keith Presents Thee Undatakerz has thus far been the only album released by the group. It is unknown whether the group will return.

The group's only album was given a two-star rating by AllMusic, whose reviewer David Jeffries referred to it as "a sign of life for sure, but Keith ain't back on track yet."

== Discography ==
Album information
Kool Keith Presents Thee Undatakerz
- Released: May 11, 2004
- Chart positions: N/A
- Last RIAA certification: N/A
- Singles: "Party in tha Morgue"
