= Soil discography =

SOiL discography
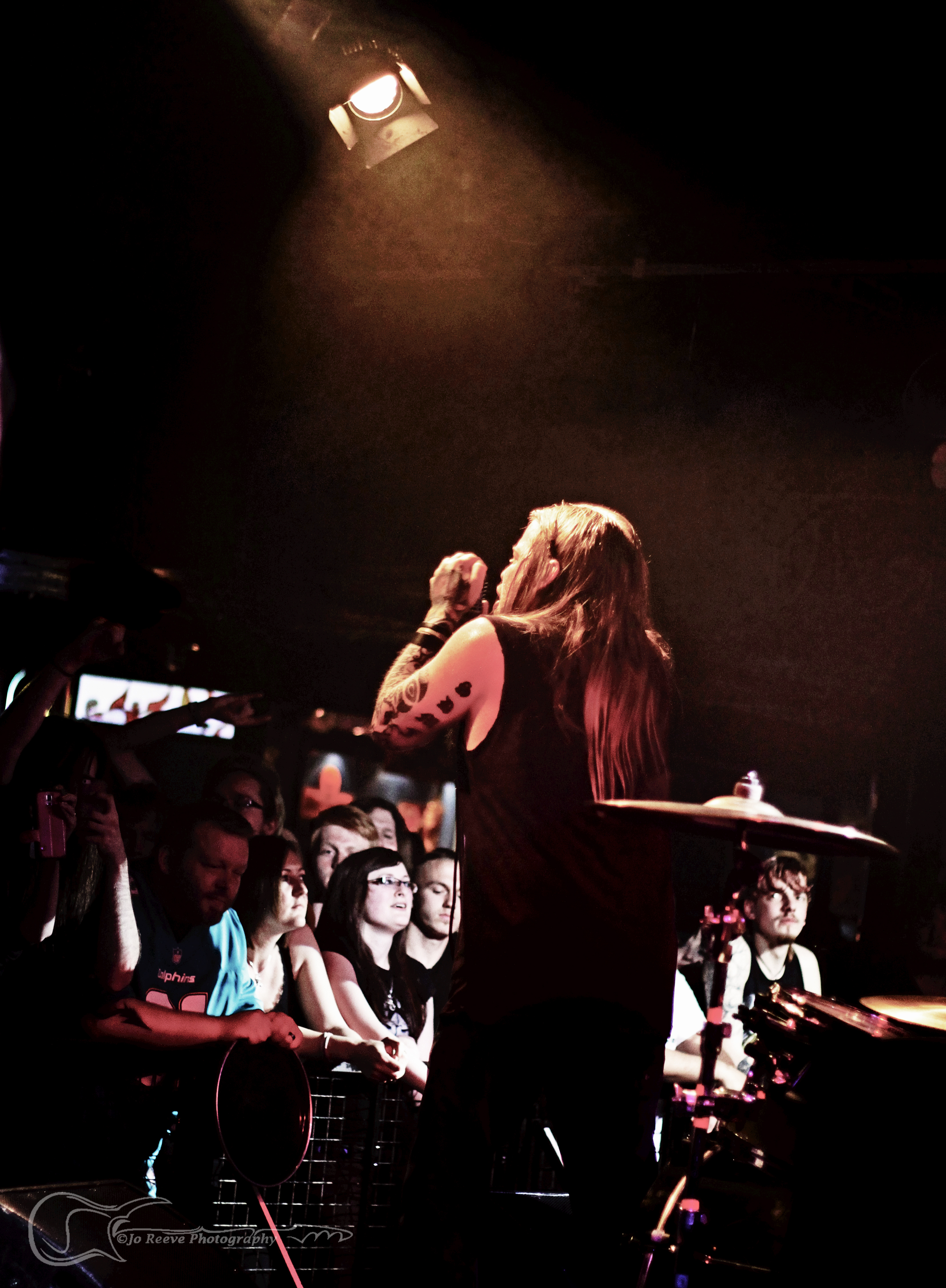
- Studio albums: 6
- EPs: 3
- Live albums: 1
- Singles: 11

The discography of SOiL, an American rock band, consists of eight studio albums, one live album, three extended plays and eleven singles. As of 2023, SOiL has sold over 2 million albums worldwide.

== Albums ==
=== Studio albums ===
List of studio albums, with selected chart positions and certifications
Title	Album details	Peak chart positions						Certifications
Title	Album details	US	US Hard Rock	US Ind.	UK	UK Ind.	UK Rock	Certifications
Throttle Junkies	Released: May 18, 1999 (US); Label: MIA; Formats: CD, digital download	—	—	—	—	—	—	
Scars	Released: September 11, 2001 (US); Label: J; Formats: CD, cassette, digital download	193	—	—	150	—	21	BPI: Silver
Redefine	Released: March 23, 2004 (US); Label: J; Formats: CD, digital download	78	—	—	93	—	6	
True Self	Released: May 2, 2006 (US); Label: DRT; Formats: CD, digital download	—	—	21	171	—	7	
Picture Perfect	Released: October 20, 2009 (US); Label: Bieler Bros., AFM; Formats: CD, digital download	—	56	—	—	—	—	
Whole	Released: August 20, 2013 (US); Label: Pavement, AFM; Formats: CD, LP, digital download	141	10	32	158	35	13	
Play It Forward	Released: August 26, 2022 (US); Label: Cleopatra; Formats: CD, LP, digital download	—	—	—	—	—	—	
Restoration	Released: July 21, 2023 (US); Label: Cleopatra; Formats: CD, LP, digital download	—	—	—	—	—	—	
"—" denotes a recording that did not chart or was not released in that territory.

=== Live albums ===
List of live albums
Title	Album details
Re-LIVE-ing the Scars: In London	Released: May 8, 2012 (US); Label: Bieler Bros.; Formats: CD, DVD, digital download

=== Compilation albums ===
List of compilation albums
Title	Album details
Scream: The Essentials	Released: September 15, 2017; Label: AFM, Pavement; Formats: CD, digital download

=== Extended plays ===
List of extended plays
Title	Album details
Soil	Released: 1997 (US); Label: Century Media; Formats: CD
El Chupacabra!	Released: November 24, 1998 (US); Label: MIA; Formats: CD
Pride EP	Released: October 14, 2003 (US); Label: J; Formats: CD
Soil Redefine: Rediscovered	Released: February 28, 2015 (US); Label: BMG MUSIC; Formats: Digital download

== Singles ==
List of singles, with selected chart positions, showing year released and album name
Title	Year	Peak chart positions				Album
Title	Year	US Act. Rock	US Main. Rock	UK	UK Rock	Album
"Damning Eden"	1999	—	—	—	—	Throttle Junkies
"Halo"	2001	—	22	74	8	Scars
"Unreal"	2002	—	31	113	12	Scars
"Breaking Me Down"	2002	—	—	—	—	Scars
"Redefine"	2004	—	11	68	8	Redefine
"Pride"	2004	—	—	—	—	Redefine
"Give It Up" (featuring Wayne Static)	2006	—	—	—	—	True Self
"Let Go"	2007	—	—	—	—	True Self
"Like It Is"	2009	—	—	—	—	Picture Perfect
"The Lesser Man"	2010	23	27	—	—	Picture Perfect
"Shine On"	2013	34	36	—	—	Whole
"The Hate Song"	2014	40	—	—	—	Whole
"Way Gone"	2014	—	—	—	—	Whole
"Rockin' in the Free World"	2022	—	—	—	—	Play It Forward
"Monkey Wrench"	2022	—	—	—	—	Play It Forward
"Nightmare"	2022	—	—	—	—	Play It Forward
"The Lesser Man 2023"	2023	—	—	—	—	Restoration
"—" denotes a recording that did not chart or was not released in that territory.
