= Elements of Corrosion =

Studio album by Oppressor
- Released: August 11, 1998
- Genre: Technical death metal
- Length: 32:08
- Label: Olympic
- Producer: Brian Griffin

Oppressor chronology
Agony (1996)	Elements of Corrosion (1998)

Elements of Corrosion is the third and final release by technical death metal band Oppressor. It was released in 1998.

== Track listing ==
No.	Title	Length
1.	"Corrosion"	3:04
2.	"Kingdom of the Dead"	3:36
3.	"Blinded"	3:50
4.	"I Despise"	3:52
5.	"Through Their Eyes"	3:19
6.	"Upon The Uncreation"	4:39
7.	"In Malice I Breathe"	3:45
8.	"Vulgar Illusions"	4:03
9.	"Lost in Sorrow"	1:53
Total length:		32:08

== Personnel ==
Oppressor

- Adam Zadel – guitarist
- Tim King – bass, vocals
- Tom Schofield – drums
- Jim Stopper – guitar

Production

- Tim King - cover art
- Brian Griffin - engineering, producer
- Brad Hall - photography
