= Vacek =

Vacek (feminine Vacková) is a Czech surname, also found in Slovakia. It is derived from the name "Václav" (in Latin, Wenceslaus), being a diminutive or nickname thereof, or denoting "son of Václav". Notable people include:

- Dan Vacek, American cannabis rights activist
- Daniel Vacek, Czech tennis player
- Edward Collins Vacek, SJ and professor of Catholic Studies at Loyola New Orleans
- Jan Vacek, Czech tennis player
- Jaroslav Vacek, Czech linguist
- Jiří Vacek, Czech mystic, writer and translator of spiritual literature
- Josef Vacek, Czech politician
- Kamil Vacek, Czech footballer
- Karel Vacek, Czech cyclist
- Mathias Vacek (born 2002), Czech cyclist
- Růžena Vacková, Czech art historian
- Václav Vacek, Czech politician

There are many variants or derivatives of this surname:

- Watzek - a Germanized spelling.
- Watsek- an English spelling derived from the German spelling upon immigration to the United States.
- Watzke - a Germanized derivation, dating back to the late Middle Ages. Other spellings such as Watsky, Watzky, Watski have been noted in various countries.
- Vacke - a re-Czechized or Slovacized spelling of Watzke.
- Watzka - a Germanized derivation, of some antiquity.
- Vacka - a re-Czechized or Slovacized spelling of Watzka.
- Watz - an aristocratic Austrian arms-bearing family, believed to be derived from Vacek/Watzek.
- Wacke - a spelling found in Poland; it is also the archaic Czech spelling.
- Wacyk/Vacyk - a Ukrainianized spelling found in Galicia.
- Watsko/Watzko - a Ukrainian (Galician) derivative.
