= Agonia =

Agonia may refer to:

- Latin word for agony
- Passion of Jesus, also called the Agony of Christ
- Agonia (1969 film), a 1969 Greek drama film directed by Odysseas Kosteletos
