= Agony (Oppressor album) =

Studio album by Oppressor
- Released: October 22, 1996
- Recorded: Choice Studios, February - March 1996.
- Genre: Technical death metal
- Length: 37:43
- Label: Olympic
- Producer: Brian Griffin

Oppressor chronology
Oppression Live/As Blood Flows (1995)	Agony (1996)	Elements of Corrosion (1998)

Agony is the second studio album by technical death metal band Oppressor. It was released in 1996.

== Track listing ==
No.	Title	Length
1.	"Gone"	3:28
2.	"Suffersystem"	0:52
3.	"In Exile"	5:59
4.	"Passage"	4:31
5.	"Valley of Thorns"	5:18
6.	"Re-define" (^{†})	4:09
7.	"Sea of Tears"	3:50
8.	"I Am Darkness"	4:23
9.	"Carnal Voyage"	5:08
Total length:		37:43

== Personnel ==
Oppressor

- Adam Zadel – Guitarist
- Tim King – Bassist and Vocals
- Tom Schofield – Drummer
- Jim Stopper – Guitarist

Production

- Brad Hall - Photography
- Brian Griffin - Engineering, Mixing, Producer
- Adam Zadel - Engineering assistant
- Rob Stephenson - Engineering assistant
- Jim Morris - Mastering
- Tim King - Lyrics
- SV Bell - Cover art, Logo
