= Minarik =

Minarik, Minařík, or Minárik (feminine: Minaříková or Mináriková) is a surname. It is derived from a dialectical form of the word mlynář, i.e. 'miller'. Notable people with this surname include:

- Anton Minárik (born 1977), Slovak judoka
- Else Holmelund Minarik (1920–2012), American author
- Filip Minarik (1975–2023), Czech jockey
- Henry Minarik (1927–2018), American football player
- Ján Minárik (born 1997), Slovak footballer
- Kateřina Minařík Kudějová (born 1990), Czech canoeist
- Květoslav Minařík (1908–1974), Czech author
- Marek Minařík (born 1993), Czech baseball player
- Martin Minařík (1967–2009), Czech mountaineer
- Pavol Minárik (1957–2018), Slovak politician.
- Stephen Minarik (1960–2009), American politician
