= Dying Inside (disambiguation) =

Dying Inside is a 1972 science fiction novel by Robert Silverberg.

Dying Inside may also refer to:

== Songs ==
- "Dying Inside", by Brandon Paris Band from On My Own, 2006
- "Dying Inside", by the Cranberries from Wake Up and Smell the Coffee, 2001
- "Dying Inside", by Death Before Dishonor from Friends Family Forever, 2005
- "Dying Inside", by Gary Barlow from Since I Saw You Last, 2013
- "Dying Inside", by Jerry Cantrell from Degradation Trip Volume 2, 2002
- "Dying Inside", by Oppressor from Solstice of Oppression, 1994
- "Dying Inside", by Saint Vitus from Born Too Late, 1986
- "Dying Inside", by Suicide Commando from Stored Images, 1995
- "(Dying Inside) To Hold You", by Timmy Thomas, 1990
- "Dying Inside To Hold You" by Darren Espanto, 2017

== Other uses ==
- "Dying Inside" (Strong Medicine), a 2005 television episode
- Silent Hill: Dying Inside, a 2004 comic book series in the Silent Hill franchise

== See also ==
- Dead Inside (disambiguation)
