= Throttle Junkies =

Studio album by SOiL
- Released: May 18, 1999 (re-released on August 14, 2007)
- Recorded: 1998–1999
- Genre: Nu metal
- Length: 48:40
- Label: MIA
- Producer: Steve Albini

SOiL chronology
El Chupacabra (1998)	Throttle Junkies (1999)	Scars (2001)

Professional ratings
Review scores
Source	Rating
AllMusic	link

Throttle Junkies is the first studio album by American rock band SOiL. It was released on May 18, 1999 via MIA Records. It included tracks previously released on the band's EPs Soil and El Chupacabra. While it did not chart in the US, it reached #16 on the CMJ New Music Report.

Not long after the album's release, MIA folded. This led to Soil developing demos that eventually gained them a major label deal with J Records.

The album was re-released with bonus tracks on August 14, 2007.

== Track listing ==
No.	Title	Length
1.	"Everything"	2:57
2.	"Road to Ruin"	2:37
3.	"Damning Eden"	3:00
4.	"F-Hole"	2:54
5.	"Man I Am"	3:48
6.	"Hello Again"	3:19
7.	"Butterfly"	3:03
8.	"Growing Ways"	4:08
9.	"Stand to Fall"	4:08
10.	"Concrete Slave"	3:42
11.	"She"	3:26
12.	"Crucified"	4:29
13.	"Shining Man"	3:51
14.	"Damning Eden (Acoustic)"	3:18
Total length:		48:40

2007 reissue
No.	Title	Length
15.	"Black Betty" (Ram Jam cover)	2:39
16.	"Triple 6's"	2:54
17.	"Two Cent Friend"	3:53
Total length:		9:26

== Personnel ==
- Ryan McCombs – lead vocals
- Adam Zadel – lead guitar, backing vocals
- Shaun Glass – rhythm guitar
- Tim King – bass guitar
- Tom Schofield – drums
