= El Chupacabra (EP) =

El Chupacabra!

EP by SOiL
- Released: November 24, 1998
- Genre: Nu metal
- Label: Mia

SOiL chronology
Soil (1997)	El Chupacabra! (1998)	Throttle Junkies (1999)

Professional ratings
Review scores
Source	Rating
AllMusic	link

El Chupacabra is an EP by American rock band SOiL. The name of the EP refers to a mythical Puerto Rican beast, and literally means "goat-sucker" in Spanish. Songs from the EP later appeared on Soil's first album, Throttle Junkies.

== Track listing ==
1. "F-Hole" – 2:55
2. "Broken Wings" – 4:15
3. "Crucified" – 4:31
4. "She" – 3:28
5. "Two Cent Friend" – 3:53

== Personnel ==
- Ryan McCombs – vocals
- Adam Zadel – guitar, backing vocals
- Shaun Glass – guitar
- Tim King – bass guitar
- Tom Schofield – drums
