= Soil (EP) =

EP by SOiL
- Released: 1997
- Genre: Nu metal
- Length: 21:02
- Label: Century Media

SOiL chronology
Soil (1997)	El Chupacabra (1998)

Soil is the first EP by American metal band SOiL. According to the band's vocalist, Ryan McCombs, this release was referred to by the band as "the worm disc". The tracks "Broken Wings" and "She" reappeared on a second EP, El Chupacabra, in 1998. Songs from both EPs then appeared on Soil's first album, Throttle Junkies, the following year.

== Track listing ==
1. "Broken Wings" – 4:20
2. "No More, No Less" – 3:07
3. "She" – 3:28
4. "Same Ol' Trip" – 3:57
5. "Yellow Lines" – 5:09

== Personnel ==
- Ryan McCombs – vocals
- Adam Zadel – guitar, backing vocals
- Shaun Glass – guitar
- Tim King – bass guitar
- Tom Schofield – drums
