= Picture Perfect (Soil album) =

Studio album by SOiL
- Released: October 20, 2009
- Genre: Alternative metal, hard rock, post-grunge
- Length: 48:15
- Label: AFM Records (Europe); Bieler Bros. Records (international)
- Producer: Johnny K, Ulrich Wild, SOiL

SOiL chronology
True Self (2006)	Picture Perfect (2009)	Whole (2013)

Professional ratings
Review scores
Source	Rating
AllMusic	3/5 stars

Picture Perfect is the fifth studio album by American rock band SOiL, released on October 20, 2009. It was produced by Johnny K, Ulrich Wild, and SOiL, with Dave Fortman handling mixing duties. Picture Perfect is the final album to feature vocalist A.J. Cavalier, with Ryan McCombs making his return to the band in late 2011. Two singles were released from the album, "Like It Is" and "The Lesser Man".

== Track listing ==
No.	Title	Writer(s)	Length
1.	"Tear It Down"	SOiL	3:12
2.	"The Lesser Man"	SOiL	3:39
3.	"Like It Is"	SOiL	3:29
4.	"Picture Perfect"	SOiL	4:04
5.	"Surrounded"	SOiL, Miguel Gonzalez, Brian Howe	3:36
6.	"Wasted"	SOiL, Bob Marlette	3:27
7.	"Every Moment"	SOiL	3:13
8.	"Anymore"	SOiL	4:14
9.	"Falter"	SOiL	3:39
10.	"Too Far Away"	SOiL	4:29
11.	"Calling Out"	SOiL	3:38
12.	"Temptation"	SOiL	3:50
13.	"Last Wish"	SOiL	3:45
Total length:			48:15

Limited edition
No.	Title	Length
14.	"Chosen One"	3:20
Total length:		51:35

== Personnel ==
- A.J. Cavalier – lead vocals
- Adam Zadel – lead guitar, backing vocals
- Tim King – bass, backing vocals
- Tom Schofield – drums
