= Tolis Voskopoulos =

Greek singer, actor and composer (1940–2021)

Tolis Voskopoulos Τόλης Βοσκόπουλος
- Born: Apostolos Voskopoulos; 26 July 1940; Kokkinia, Piraeus, Kingdom of Greece
- Died: 19 July 2021 (aged 80) Athens, Greece
- Genre: Laika
- Occupations: Singer, actor, composer
- Years active: 1958–2021
- Spouse: Angela Gerekou

Apostolos "Tolis" Voskopoulos (Greek: Απόστολος "Τόλης" Βοσκόπουλος; 26 July 1940 – 19 July 2021) was a Greek singer. He was renowned for his mastery of laika, a Greek music style.

He also starred in many films and played in the theatre in Athens.

Voskopoulos was born on 26 July 1940 in the Kokkinia neighbourhood of Piraeus. One of Voskopoulos' greatest theatrical hits was Oi Erastes tou Oneirou (Dream Lovers), which he performed opposite Zoe Laskari.

Voskopoulos was married to former minister Antzela Gerekou.

He was hospitalized with respiratory problems, at 251 Air Force General Hospital, in May 2021, and died of a cardiac arrest, on 19 July 2021, at age 80.

== Discography ==
This is a partial list of Tolis Voskopoulos' discography:

=== Albums ===
- 1967: Doukissa & Voskopoulos – Anamnisis
- 1968: Agonia
- 1970: Adelphia Mou, Alites, Poulia
- 1970: Se Iketevo
- 1971: Mia Agapi
- 1972: Stigmes Agapis
- 1972: Tolis Voskopoulos (Stichimatizo)
- 1973: As Imaste Realiste
- 1974: Marinella & Voskopoulos
- 1974: Marinella & Tolis Voskopoulos - Ego Ki' Esy
- 1975: Ego Ti Eho Ke Ti Tha 'Ho
- 1976: Smyrneika Ke Laika
- 1976: Otan Tragoudo
- 1977: Ine To Kati Pou Meni
- 1977: I Anamnisis Xanagyrizoune
- 1978: Tragouda Theatrine!
- 1979: Mera Nihta Pantou
- 1980: 80
- 1981: Kardia Mou Moni
- 1982: Den Thelo Na Thimame
- 1983: Eisai Dikia Mou
- 1984: O Tolis Voskopoulos Tragouda Manoli Chioti (Perasmenes Mou Agapes)
- 1985: Tote
- 1985: Tora
- 1986: Ametrita Giati
- 1987: 16 Ap' Ta Oraiotera Tragoudia Mou
- 1987: Atelioto Erotiko Taxidi
- 1988: I Megaliteres Epitihies
- 1989: I Megales Epitihies
- 1989: I Megaliteres Epitihies No. 2
- 1990: Tolis Voskopoulos Gia Panta
- 1990: Na Kanoume Enan Erota Olo Trela
- 1990: Oli I Alithia
- 1991: Stazeis Erota
- 1993: Konta Sou Ego
- 1995: Anepanaliptos
- 1996 Matia Feggaria
- 1998: Irthes San Oniro
- 1999: I Nichta Gemise Fos
- 2000: Ta Erotika
- 2001: Live 2000 – 2001
- 2002: I Sosti Apantisi
- 2003: Kali Sou Tichi
- 2005: Antitheto Revma
- 2006: Stis Zois Mou Tis Strates
- 2007: Na Me Koitas Sta Matia

== Selected filmography ==
Year	Title	Role	Notes
1971	Marijuana Stop!		
1969	Agonia		

== Sources ==
- "Τόλης Βοσκόπουλος: «Βαρύς ο πόνος και βουβός» - Το twitter αποχαιρετά τον «άρχοντα» του πενταγράμμου". CNN.gr (in Greek). 19 July 2021.
