= Dead Inside =

Dead Inside may refer to:

== Film and television ==
- The Dead Inside (2011 film), an American musical horror film
- The Dead Inside (2013 film), a British horror film
- "Dead Inside" (CSI: NY), a 2008 television episode

== Music ==
- Dead Inside (album), by the Golden Palominos, 1996
- "Dead Inside" (song), by Muse, 2015
- "Dead Inside" (Nita Strauss song), 2021
- "Dead Inside", a song by Blackbear from In Loving Memory, 2022
- "Dead Inside", a song by Numb from Christmeister, 1989
- "Dead Inside", a song by Mudvayne from Mudvayne, 2009
- "Dead Inside", a song by XXXTentacion from 17, 2017

== Other uses ==
- Dead Inside (game), a role-playing game

== See also ==
- Dying Inside (disambiguation)
- Major depressive disorder
