= Karel Werner =

Indologist, orientalist, religious studies scholar (1925–2019)

Karel Werner (12 January 1925 – 26 November 2019) was an indologist, orientalist, religious studies scholar, and philosopher of religion born in Jemnice in what is now the Czech Republic.

== Life ==
Werner has described his childhood in the small town in south Moravia as idyllic. His father was a ‘master-baker’ and ran a small confectionery shop, and his mother was originally a qualified cook. The idyll ended when in 1933 their house was sold in an auction as a result of arrears in mortgage repayments during the Great Depression.

The family then moved to Znojmo, a district town, not far from the Austrian borders. Here Werner started his secondary education in the local grammar school (called reálné gymnasium) which was interrupted by the incorporation of Znojmo into the ‘Sudetenland’ after the Munich Agreement in 1938. He continued his studies in Brno, but could not undergo final, so-called ‘maturity’, examinations, because of restrictions imposed by the German occupation authorities in the closing years of the war. He passed them after the war in the liberated Czechoslovakia in autumn 1945 and enrolled in the Philosophical Faculty of the Masaryk University in Brno, reading philosophy and history and studying Sanskrit and classical Chinese from textbooks. He was earmarked for the post of assistant in the Philosophy Department headed by Professor J. L. Fischer who, upon being appointed Rector of Palacký University in Olomouc, asked him to follow him.

Here he was given the opportunity to study classical Chinese under Professor Jaroslav Průšek and to perfect his Sanskrit under Professor Vincenc Lesný, who accepted him as his assistant when, after the communist putsch of February 1948, Marxist philosophy became dominant and Werner could not hope to pursue the career in comparative philosophy which J. L. Fischer had originally foreseen for him. He gained his PhD, having defended his thesis on a semantological analysis of primitive languages and passed the rigorous examinations in philosophy and Indian philology in May 1949. He also took state examinations in philosophy and history as a qualification entitling him to teach in gymnasiums.

In autumn 1950 Werner was entrusted with lectures on the comparative grammar of Sanskrit and on the History of India and published his first academic paper abroad. He was also asked to give a course in the history of ancient Middle East, but was criticised for failing to apply to it the Marxist method of historical and dialectical materialism. He was also investigated by the Secret police for his contacts with foreign visitors. In autumn 1951 Oriental Studies in Olomouc were closed down. Prof. Lesný's request for Werner's transfer to Charles University in Prague was turned down for political reasons and he was dismissed at a fortnight's notice. His own application for a teaching post in a gymnasium was turned down for the same reasons.

In the chaos created by the communist government during the wholesale nationalisation of industry and commerce Werner found a job in an enterprise newly created for building roads and railways. One of his tasks was to produce detailed descriptions of work done by technical staff, which placed him in the category of technical (rather than administrative) clerks and this became the designation of his occupation entered in his identity card. When a year later he had to begin his two-year military service, he was given only the most basic training and became, as a ‘technician’, the assistant of the regimental caretaker-cum-quartermaster (1952–54). (After the purge of ‘bourgeois’ officers, the newly commissioned substitutes of working-class origin needed, owing to their lack of competence, the unofficial but tolerated help of educated soldiers who for political reasons were not deemed fit for officer training. After his military service, Werner did not get his previous job back, but was transferred, in a similar capacity, to the headquarters of the nationalised enterprise overseeing restaurants and canteens. A year later (1955) he lost even this job to a communist party member and after a short training period worked as a restaurant manager (1956–60).

Time permitting, Werner continued his studies and published articles on indological topics in England, West Germany, India and Sri Lanka. It was a time of court proceedings against suspected anticommunist dissidents who were often sentenced on trumped-up charges. Werner's foreign contacts led to his being investigated by the secret police on suspicion of belonging to a spy ring, passing messages abroad under the pretence of academic articles. No evidence was found and Werner withstood intimidating pressure to confess. No charges were brought against him., but he was sent to work in a coal mine for one year and thereafter was allowed to work only in manual jobs - in gasworks (1961–64), as a plumber (1964) and as a tram driver (1964–67).

The investigation by the secret police had a side effect. The restaurant Werner was in charge of was being transferred in his absence to a new manager. A substantial deficit was figured out in its accounts and Werner was accused of stealing state property. Before the court proceedings he was allowed to check the accounts and found faults in them. Their correction reduced the assumed deficit to an insignificant sum due probably to a still undiscovered fault. Nevertheless, the judge, one of those newly appointed from working-class cadres after six week training, who did not even allowed Werner to speak during the court ‘hearing’, found him guilty. However, the appeal judge, still from the old fully qualified ranks, acquitted him.

After the loss of his academic position Werner came to appreciate some practical aspects of Indian teachings. He mastered the basic set of hatha yoga positions and procedures, adopted the practice of Buddhist meditation and headed a clandestine group of like-minded practitioners. He further entered into correspondence with foreign organisations and personalities, among them with the Buddhist Society in London, the Buddhist Publication Society in Kandy, Sri Lanka, and its editor Nyanaponika Thera, The Yoga Institute in Santa Cruz, Bombay and Lonavla, the Buddhistisches Seminar für Seinskunde, founded and conducted by Paul Debes from his isolated retreat in Lüneburger Heide near Hamburg, the Yoga Institute in Fulda, West Germany, founded by Dr Otto Albert Isbert, Mrs C. Walinski-Heller in Nürnberg, who had been in 1959 the Mother of Svami Shivanada's ashram in Rishikesh, and the Order Ārya Maitreya Mandala (AMM) founded in India by Lama Anagarika Govinda and headed in West Germany by Dr. Karl-Heinz Gottmann. He made some written contributions to the publication activities of these organisations. At home he started contributing to the flourishing clandestine publication activities geared to spiritual practices by translating Buddhist texts and books. These circulated in typescript copies.

When he discovered that members of the Soviet Academy of Sciences working in its Moscow headquarters were practicing hatha yoga positions as their obligatory morning exercises (introduced by a member who had learned them while doing some research in India), he used it to persuade a newspaper to publish his first illustrated article on hatha yoga. As a result, he was invited to give several lectures with demonstrations in Bratislava, Slovakia, with a television program (1963), and a year later he was allowed to repeat the lectures in Brno and several other towns in Moravia, Bohemia and Slovakia. The social club of the biggest factory in Brno then invited him to conduct courses in hatha yoga and enabled him to found The Yoga Club (1964) in which he was able to introduce cautiously some spiritual elements, such as meditation, under the heading of relaxation. This club continued to function under instructors trained by Werner even after his emigration in the wake of the Soviet invasion (1968) and still exists, now on an independent basis.

In 1966 a meeting for discussions was arranged for him in Halle (East Germany) with a pupil of Paul Debes from West Germany and here Werner also met Professor Heinz Mode, an expert on Buddhist sculpture of Sri Lanka and India, who knew of his activities. The same year he visited Budapest at the invitation of Dr Hetényi who headed the Hungarian branch of AMM and the so-called Institute of Buddhist Philosophy. He was also shown the healing methods in the internationally known Institute for physically and mentally handicapped children, founded and headed by Dr Petö who was achieving great results by special methods inspired by yoga and Daoist slow motion exercises in combination with the recitation of Tibetan mantras.

Therapeutical effects of the hatha yoga practice were also demonstrated in Werner's courses. A case in point was a member of the orchestra of the Brno opera who suffered from a serious psychosomatic condition which was causing him great embarrassment during long operatic acts. No medical, psychiatric or psychotherapeutical treatment he had undergone had cured him. In the end he was told by the chief district psychiatrist: “Go to that crazy Werner, maybe he will help you with his yoga.” His full recovery after only a few weeks had an unexpected effect. Werner was invited to lecture on ‘Oriental therapies’ in the yearly advanced training courses for psychiatrists and was appointed the editor of the Psychiatric Digest. His working place was the Psychiatric Institute in Kroměříž (1967–68), where he was engaged in a project researching the physiological processes during the practice of yoga and meditation and the possibilities of their therapeutic application. For that purpose he was personally subjected to the appropriate measurements of his bodily functions, which included the EEG of his brain activity, while assuming yogic positions and practising meditation. He was further training a team of doctors and nurses at the Institute in these activities.

Werner was over the years receiving invitations from institutions in the West that he was in touch with to take part in seminars and conferences, and therefore he kept applying, for several years unsuccessfully, for a passport. In 1967 he obtained one and the director of the Psychiatric Institute granted him six weeks’ leave for a ‘study trip’ in West Germany. During this time he participated in international conference of yoga teachers, an internal seminar of the AMM held in the ‘House of Stillness’ (Hause der Stille) in Roseburg and was granted honorary membership of the Order of AMM. In the forest retreat of Paul Debes in Lüneburger Heide he held discussions with him, his helpers and pupils. He also visited Mrs Walinski-Heller, who outlined a plan to open a clinic for yoga therapy in Nürnberg in collaboration with the Kroměříž Institute, Werner acting as a go-between. (The plan was subsequently enthusiastically welcomed by the director in Kroměříž.) On the way back Werner was a guest of Professor Heinz Mode in Halle, spent some time in Leipzig where in the Indological Department of the university he met Dr Heinz Kucharski, who briefed him on the activities of their secret Yoga Association, and took part in reading Chinese Buddhist texts in the Sinological Department. In East Berlin he visited Professor J. H. Schultz, known as the author of ‘autogenic training’, a psychotherapeutic procedure inspired by the hathayoga method of relaxation.

In January 1968 came the so-called ‘Prague Spring’ with Alexander Dubček, the new leader of the communist party, who initiated liberal reforms. Werner made an application to the Ministry of Education for his reinstatement into his academic appointment, but the reply was negative. Not even under ‘communism with a human face’, which is how Dubček described the system he aimed to introduce, was a non-party member allowed to teach humanities. Using the freer atmosphere in other ways, Werner brought his Yoga Club into the open and conducted his hatha yoga course in premises lent to the club by the Educational Department of Brno municipality. On 8 May he founded, with the assistance of Viennese Buddhists, the ‘Buddhist Circle of Czechoslovakia’. However, the Soviet invasion of the country on 21 August 1968 put a stop to these activities. It also prevented Werner's planned departure for England by air, to fulfill an invitation from the Buddhist Society in London to lecture at their Summer School that month. Taking advantage of the chaotic situation in towns which was tying down the invading army, while the borders remained manned by Czech guards, Werner crossed over to Bavaria two days after the invasion and arrived only a few days late in the Buddhist Summer School in England. He fulfilled his teaching assignment, but anticipating renewed oppression in his native country after the re-introduction of totalitarian government, which would inevitably lead to his further persecution, Werner decided to stay and settle in England.

Here he was first employed in the Cambridge University Library and was also appointed as a supervisor in Sanskrit for Churchill College. In 1969 he won the appointment as Spalding Lecturer in Indian Philosophy and Religion in the School of Oriental Studies in the University of Durham, where he newly introduced courses in Sanskrit and also conducted courses in yoga and Indian civilisation for the university's Extramural Department as well as for the University of Leeds. He again taught in the Summer School of the Buddhist Society and also in teacher training courses of the British Wheel of Yoga. In 1975 he founded annual academic Symposia in Indian religions which he conducted for ten years and which still continue under elected committees. In 2010 he returned to conduct the 35th symposium held in Oxford in honour of his 85th birthday. the years 1975-1976 he was a guest professor in the Peradeniya University in Kandy, Sri Lanka, in Karnataka State University in Dharwar and in Benares Hindu University in Varanasi. He gave occasional guest lectures in the universities of Cambridge, Oxford, London, Lancaster, Manchester and Stirling. During his academic tenure Werner travelled extensively in Asian countries, including India, Sri Lanka, Burma, Thailand, Cambodia, Vietnam, Indonesia and Japan.

Werner's retirement in 1990 coincided with the collapse of communist regimes and he was able to become active in his native country. The Society for Science and Art (Svaz pro vědu a umění), with headquarters in the US and membership recruited from Czech and Slovak refugee academics around the World could hold its biennial conference for the first time in Prague and he was invited to chair its section on religions. Subsequently, in the years 1991–1993, he was a corresponding member of the Czech Academy of Arts and Sciences and in the years 1993-1998 he was professor in the Masaryk University of Brno, in the Institute for the Study of Religions, which he helped to found (replacing the abolished Institute of Atheistic Studies of the communist era). In the years 1991-1993 he was several times the guest lecturer for the Swan Hellenic travel agency on tours through India, Nepal, Cambodia and Vietnam. In 1999 he visited South Korea for the first time and in the years 2002-2007 he became a guest professor in the Institute of Buddhist Studies of the Dongkuk University in Seoul and Kyeongju. Since 1993 he has been an honorary professorial Research Associate in the Department of the Study of Religions, School of Oriental and African Studies (SOAS), University of London. He is a Fellow of the Royal Asiatic Society (FRAS) and of the Temenos Academy (FTA).

Werner had left his country legally after the Soviet invasion, on his still valid passport. Subsequently, he was granted, through the Czechoslovak Embassy in London, a temporary permission to reside abroad. But his application for permanent permission was refused by the Ministry of Interior in Prague in December 1969 and he thus became an illegal emigrant. His first marriage ended in divorce, and he remarried at the end of 1970. In due course he acquired British citizenship. He lived with his wife in London.

== Work ==
Werner's research was directed to the collections of Vedic hymns, particularly those which contain philosophical ideas or can be construed as anticipating the beginnings of yoga, and to the question of their possible origin in Indo-European antiquity. He has been further preoccupied with the evolution of yogic and Buddhist spiritual practices and with the topic of rebirth or reincarnation in Indian teachings and in European thought. In this context he repeatedly turned his attention to the problem of the nature of the transmigrating personality in the Vedas, Upanishads and Buddhism. During his spell in the Philosophical Faculty of Masaryk University he was directed to produce broad surveys of the main religious traditions of Asia, and these were published as two books by the university for students and later in revised form for the public by a commercial publishing house which, besides, commissioned him to write a book on Jainism to be published towards the end of 2013. In the academic year 2012/13 SOAS inaugurated a new MA course, in Traditions of Yoga and Meditation, and Werner was invited to give the keynote lecture during its first session. He was further commissioned by a commercial publishing house to write A History of Yoga.

== Religious and philosophical outlook ==
Werner was raised as a Roman Catholic and in the years 1934-1937 he was a server in the Dominican monastery in Znojmo and a member of the order Legio angelica. At the beginning of his secondary education in 1936 (in the so-called real gymnasium lasting eight years) he declared priesthood as the goal of his studies, but within two years, having experienced substantial expansion of his mental horizon through his studies based on the gymnasium's excellent curriculum, he lost his religious faith. After two further years of intellectual ‘drifting’ he discovered books about Oriental religions and decided to study philosophy and comparative religion in the hope of becoming better able to understand questions relating to the nature of existence and its possible goal. He conceives philosophy in the Socratic way as a search for the meaning of life, although he is aware that it can never be fully known. But philosophy can point to a direction in which to look and clarify the preconditions, one of them being the necessity of observing ethical principles. Philosophy can therefore enable one to “live in the direction of the meaning of life”, which was a phrase coined by Robert Konečný, his first teacher of philosophy in 1945 at the Masaryk University in Brno.

Werner concedes that the gist of the teachings of the Buddha, as it is deducible from his discourses in the Pāli Canon, is closest to his own thinking. The discourses appeal to him by their rationality and by methodical descriptions of meditative practices, but he does not regard himself as a ‘believing Buddhist’; he points out that embracing a faith absolutely often leads astray as has been and still is repeatedly demonstrated by religious orthodoxies. This is true also of rigidly held scientific theories, including biological materialism, such as the one advocated by Richard Dawkins, but he accepts the validity of his arguments against the existence of an almighty and all-knowing god creator. In place of faith or acceptance of scientific theories, if they deny the possibility of the existence of transcendental dimensions of reality because there is no objective proof for them, he applies the philosophical concept of ‘logical probability’. To monotheism and ‘scientific’ materialism, when held as ‘world views’, he ascribes a very small, if any, measure of logical probability. But to soberly understood principles and arguments contained in the Buddha's discourses he is inclined to accord a very large measure of logical probability and regards them as suitable guidelines for living ‘in the direction of the meaning of life’. He is aware that adherents of Buddhism, and especially Theravāda monks, often accept and interpret Buddhism on the basis of their belief in the literal validity of the Buddha's reported words and sometimes even try to support them by assertions or indications of their personal experience. But Werner maintains a reserved attitude and provisionally accepts only what is supported by his own experience and reflection. He thinks that in this respect he follows the advice contained in the most often quoted discourse of the Buddha.

== Publications ==
- On the Philosophy of Yājñavalkya, Bharatiya Vidya XI/3/4, Bombay, 1950, 166–177.
- Buddhism in Czechoslovakia. Attempt to form Group, World Buddhism XIII/1, Dehiwala, 1964, 5–6.
- Problems of Buddhism in Czechoslovakia, World Buddhism XIII/6, Dehiwala, 1964, 7–8.
- Interest in Buddhism in Czechoslovakia, The Middle Way, XV, May, 1965, 1.
- The Three Roots of Ill and Our Daily Life, (Bodhi Leaves No 24), Buddhist PublicationSociety, Kandy, 1965, 26pp. Korean translation: The Calm Voice, Seoul, 1987, reprint 2008.
- Yoga in Czechoslovakia, Journal of the Yoga Institute 12, Santa Cruz, Bombay, 1967, 167–9.
- Buddhist Circle of Czechoslovakia, World Buddhism XVII, Dehiwala, July 1968, 325.
- Hathajóga. Základy tělesných cvičení jógických, Olympia, Praha 1969, 2. vyd. 1971, 3. vyd. CAD Press, Bratislava, 2009, 203pp.
- Buddhism and Ritual, The Middle Way XLIV/1, London, 1969, 16–18.
- Die existentielle Situation des Menschen in europäischer und indischer Philosophie und die Rolle des Yoga, Wissen und Wandel XVII/11, Hamburg, 1971, 322–340.
- Zur Philosophie des Tantrismus, Der Kreis 100, Meersburg-Daisendorf, 1972, 11–15.
- The Law of kamma and Mindfulness (Bodhi Leaves B 61) Buddhist Publication Society, Kandy, 1973, 31pp. Korean translation: The Calm Voice, Seoul, 1988.
- The Indian Experience of Totality, Wege zur Ganzheit - Festschrift zum 75. Geburtstag von Lama Govinda, Almora, 1973, 219–233.
- Authenticity in the Interpretation of Buddhism, The Cardinal Meaning. Essays in Comparative Hermeneutics: Buddhism and Christianity, ed. by M. Pye & R. Morgan, The Hague & Paris, 1973, 161–193.
- Religious Practice and Yoga in the Time of the Vedas, Upaniṣads and Early Buddhism, Annals of the Bhandarkar Oriental Research Institute LVI, Poona, 1975, 179–194.
- Yoga and Indian Philosophy, Motilal Banarsidass, New Delhi 1977, repr. 1980 & 1998 (paperback), XII, 190pp.
- Spiritual Personality and its Formation according to Indian Tradition, Maitreya 6, Boulder & London, 1977, 93–103.
- On Interpreting the Vedas, Religion 7/2, 1977, 189–200.
- Yoga and the R,.g Veda. An Interpretation of the keśin hymn, RV 10,136, Religious Studies 13/3, 1977, 289–302.
- The longhaired Sage of R,.g Veda 10,136; A Shaman, a Mystic or a Yogi? The Yogi and the Mystic. Studies in Indian and Comparative Mysticism (Durham Indological Series 1), ed. Karel Werner, Curzon Press, London, 1989, repr. 1994, 33–53.
- Symbolism in the Vedas and its Conceptualisation, Numen, International Review for the History of Religions XXIV/3, 1977, 223–240.

Reprinted in:

- Symbols in Art and Religion. The Indian and the Comparative Perspectives (Durham Indological Series 2), ed. Karel Werner, Curzon Press, London, 1990, 27–45.
- The Vedic Concept of Human Personality and its Destiny, Journal of Indian Philosophy 5, The Hague, 1978, 275–289.
- A Note on karma and Rebirth in the Vedas, Hinduism 83, London, 1978, 1–4.
- The Buddhist View of the Self and the Teaching of Rebirth, Vesak Sirisara 45, Colombo, 1980, 12–14.
- Mysticism as Doctrine and Experience, Religious Traditions 4, 1981, 1–18.

Reprinted in:

- The Yogi and the Mystic. Studies in Indian and Comparative Mysticism (Durham Indological Series 1), ed. Karel Werner, Curzon Press, London, 1989, 1–19.
- Mysticism and Indian Spirituality, Studies in Indian Philosophy, a Memorial Volume in Honour of Pandit S. Sanghvi, ed. D. Malvania & N. J. Shah, L.D. Institute of Indology, Ahmedabad, 1981, 241–256.

Reprinted in:

- The Scottish Journal of Religious Studies 3 1982, 15–25.

And in:

- The Yogi and the Mystic. Studies in Indian and Comparative Mysticism (Durham Indological Series 1), ed. Karel Werner, Curzon Press, London, 1989, 20–32.
- Bodhi and arahattaphala. From Early Buddhism to Early Mahāyāna, The Journal of the International Association of Buddhist Studies 4, 1981, 70–84.

Reprinted in:

- Buddhist Studies; Ancient and Modern (Collected Papers on South Asia No. 4, Centre of South Asian Studies, School of Oriental and African Studies, University of London), ed. by Denwood, Philip and Piatigorsky, Alexander, Curzon Press, London, 1983, 167–181.
- The Teachings of the Veda and the ādhyātmika Method of Interpretation, Golden Jubilee Volume, Vaidika Sam,.śodhana Man,.d,.ala (Vedic Research Institute), Poona, 1981, 288–295.
- The Heritage of the Vedas, The British Wheel of Yoga, Farringdon, 1982, 34 pp.
- Men, Gods and Powers in the Vedic Outlook, Journal of the Royal Asiatic Society 1, 1982, 14–24.
- The Concept of the Transcendent. Questions of Method in the History of Religions, Religion 13, 1983, 311–322.
- The Buddhist Interpretation of Experience, The Presence and Practice of Buddhism, ed. Peter Connolly & Clive Erricker, West Sussex Institute of Higher Education, Chichester, 1985, 37–53.
- The Doctrine of Rebirth in Eastern and Western Thought (Bodhi Leaves 100) Buddhist Publication Society, Kandy, 1985, 44pp. Korean translation: The Calm Voice, Seoul, 2004.
- Yoga and the Old Upanis,.ads, Perspectives on Indian Religion: Papers in Honour of Karel Werner, ed. Peter Connolly, Delhi 1986, 1–7.
- Personal Identity in the Upanis,.ads and Buddhism, Identity Issues and World Religions. Selected Proceedings of the Fifteenth Congress of the International Association for the History of Religions, ed. Victor C. Hayes, Bedford Park (South Australia), 1986, 24–33.
- Yoga, its Beginnings and Development, The British Wheel of Yoga, Farringdon, 1987, 52pp.
- Indo-Europeans and the Indo-Āryans: The philological, archaeological and historical context, Annals of the Bhandarkar Oriental Research Institute LXVIII [Ramakrishna Gopal Bhandarkar 150th Birth-Anniversary Volume], 1987, 491–523.
- Indian Concepts of Human Personality in Relation to the Doctrine of the Soul, Journal of the Royal Asiatic Society 1, 1988, 73–97.
- The Yogi and the Mystic. Studies in Indian and Comparative Mysticism (ed.), (Durham Indological Series No. 1), Curzon Press, London, 1989, 192pp. Paperback edition 1994.
- From Polytheism to Monism - Multidimensional View of the Vedic Religion, Polytheistic Systems (Cosmos 5), ed. Glenys Davies, Edinburgh University Press, 1989, 12–27.
- Symbols in Art and Religion. The Indian and the Comparative Perspectives (ed.), (Durham Indological Series No. 2), Curzon Press, London, 1990, 221pp., repr. Motilal Banarsidass Publishers PVT. Ltd., Delhi, 1991.
- Dhammapadam: Cesta k pravdě (translation), Odeon, Praha, 1992, 110pp.; 2nd revised edition, CAD Press, Bratislava 2001, 143pp.
- Love Divine. Studies in bhakti and Devotional Mysticism (ed.), (Durham Indological Series No. 3), Curzon Press, London, 1993, 226pp.
- Love and Devotion in Buddhism, Buddhist Studies Review 9/1, 1992, 5-29.

Revised and reprinted in:

- Love Divine. Studies in bhakti and Devotional Mysticism, (Durham Indological Series 3), ed. Karel Werner, Curzon Press, London, 1993, 37–52.

And in:

- The Notion of ‘Religion’ in Comparative Research. Selected Proceedings of the XVIth IAHR Congress (Rome 3–8 September 1990.), ed. Ugo Bianchi (Storia delle religioni), ‘L’ERMA’ di Bretschneider, Roma, 1994, 617–24.
- O indické etice a jejím ontickém zakotvení, Etika. Interdisciplinární časopis pro teoretickou a aplikovanou etiku IV/1, Masaryk University, Brno, 1992, 46–59.
- K metodologii studia náboženství se zvláštním ohledem na roli filosofie náboženství a na postavení teologie, Religio. Revue pro religionistiku 1/1, Masaryk University, Brno, 1993, 7-26.
- The Significance of Indian Religions for the Philosophy of Religion, Religio 1/2, Masaryk University, Brno, 1993, 165–176.
- A Popular Dictionary of Hinduism, Curzon Press, Richmond, 1994, repr. 1997, 185pp.
- Náboženství jižní a východní Asie, Masarykova univerzita, Brno, 1995, 216pp.
- Indian Conceptions of Human Personality, Asian Philosophy 6/2 (1996), 93–107.
- V bludišti tradic. Lze polidštit náboženství a spasit lidstvo?, Host. Literární revue 2/96, Brno, 1996, 17–28.
- Malá encyklopedie hinduismu, Atlantis, Brno, 1996, 216pp.
- Non-orthodox Indian philosophies, Companion Encyclopedia of Asian Philosophy, ed. Brian Carr and Indira Mahalingam, Routledge, London & New York, 1997, 114–131.
- Gibt es zwei Wahrheits- und Wirklichkeitsebenen?, Festschrift zum Gedenken an den 100. Geburtstag von Lama Anagarika Govinda, Lama und Li Gotami Stiftung, München, 1998, 180–191.
- Povaha a poselství Lotosové sútry aneb: K nástupu mahájánového buddhismu, Religio. Revue pro religionistiku 6/2, Masaryk University, Brno 1998, 115–130.
- Klášterní buddhismus v Koreji, Nový Orient 4/55, Praha, 2000, 131–138.
- Struggling to Be Heard: In and Out of Academia - on Both Sides of the Divide, The Academic Study of Religion During the Cold War. East and West, ed. by Doležalová, Iva, Martin, Luther H., & Papoušek, Dalibor, Peter Kang, New York, 2001, 193–206.
- Náboženské tradice Asie. Od Indie po Japonsko. S přihlédnutím k Přednímu východu, Masaryk University, Brno, 2002, 712pp.
- Borobudur - a Sermon in Stone, Temenos Academy Review, Autumn 2002, 48–69.
- Buddhism and World Peace. Theory and Reality in Historical Perspective, A World of Harmony and Sharing. Asian Cultures and Religions in the Age of Dialogue (Conference Proceedings), Dongkuk University, Seoul, 2004, 43–78.
- On the Nature and Message of the Lotus Sūtra in the Light of Early Buddhism and Buddhist Scholarship: Towards the Beginnings of Mahāyāna (revised version), Asian Philosophy 14/3, 2004, 209–221.
- Buddhism and Peace: Peace in the World or Peace of Mind?, International Journal of Buddhist Thought and Culture 5, Dongkuk University, Seoul, 2005, 7-33.
- Liberation in Indian Philosophy, Borchert, Donald (ed). Encyclopedia of Philosophy, 2nd edition. Detroit: Macmillan Reference USA, 2006, 326–331.
- Philosophy of Religion from the Perspective of Indian Religions, Indian Religions. Renaissance and Renewal. The Spalding Papers in Indic Studies, Equinox Publishing Ltd., London & DBBC, Oakville, 2006, 54–69.
- Encyklopedie hinduismu CAD Press, Bratislava, 2008, 274pp.
- Náboženské tradice Asie I, Od Indie po Mongolsko, s přihlédnutím k Přednímu východu, CAD Press, Bratislava, 2008, 392pp.
- Náboženské tradice Asie II, Jihovýchodní Asie, Čína, Korea a Japonsko, CAD Press, Bratislava, 2009, 420pp.
- The Place of Relic Worship in Buddhism: an Unresolved Controversy?, International Journal of Buddhist Thought and Culture 12, Dongkuk University, Seoul, 2009, 7-28.
- The Last Blade of Grass? Universal Salvation and Buddhism, International Journal of Buddhist Thought and Culture 18 & 19, Dongkuk University, Seoul, Part 1&2, 2012, 7-24 & 7-22.

== See also ==
- Kvetoslav Minarik
- Jiří Vacek
