= 80 (Tolis Voskopoulos album) =

Studio album by Tolis Voskopoulos
- Released: September 1980
- Recorded: Athens, studio Polysound, 1980
- Genres: World music, folk, modern laika
- Length: 35:34
- Language: Greek
- Label: Minos EMI
- Producer: Achilleas Theofilou

Tolis Voskopoulos chronology
Mera Nihta Pantou (1979)	80 (1980)	Kardia Mou Moni (1981)

80 (Greek: Ογδόντα; Eighty) is a studio album by Greek singer Tolis Voskopoulos. It was released in September 1980 by Minos EMI in Greece and it went gold, selling over 50,000 units. The original release was in stereo on vinyl and cassette.

== Track listing ==
Side one.

1. "Ki' eleges" - (Thanasis Polykandriotis-Sophie Pappa) – 3:01 – (Greek: Κι' έλεγες)
2. "Kardia mou, kardia mou" feat. Marinella - (Thanasis Polykandriotis-Sophie Pappa) – 2:31 – (Greek: Καρδιά μου, καρδιά μου)
3. "Ti na poume tora, ti" feat. Marinella - (Giorgos Katsaros-Mimis Theiopoulos) – 3:03 – (Greek: Τι να πούμε τώρα, τι)
4. "Ase, min to kourazis" - (Giorgos Katsaros-Mimis Theiopoulos) – 2:46 – (Greek: Άσε, μην το κουράζεις)
5. "Monachos mou kouventiazo" feat. Marinella - (Giorgos Katsaros-Mimis Theiopoulos) – 2:29 – (Greek: Μοναχός μου κουβεντιάζω)
6. "Ah ke na 'cha fragka" feat. Marinella - (Nikos Lavranos-Yiannis Parios) – 2:31 – (Greek: Αχ και να 'χα φράγκα)
7. "Mi fygis" - (Giorgos Katsaros-Mimis Theiopoulos) – 2:58 – (Greek: Μη φύγεις)

Side two.

1. "Ela min argis" - (Jean Musy-Laurence Matalon-Yiannis Parios) – 2:54 – (Greek: Έλα μην αργείς)
2. "Ti les kale, ti les kale" - (Nikos Lavranos-Yiannis Parios) – 2:01 – (Greek: Τι λες καλέ, τι λες καλέ)
3. "Minale ta matia" feat. Marinella - (Giorgos Katsaros-Yiannis Parios) – 2:31 – (Greek: Μιλάνε τα μάτια)
4. "Ise pantou" feat. Marinella - (Giorgos Katsaros-Mimis Theiopoulos) – 2:24 – (Greek: Είσαι παντού)
5. "Kita, yelao ki' as ponao" - (Thanasis Polykandriotis-Sophie Pappa) – 2:22 – (Greek: Κοίτα, γελάω κι' ας πονάω)
6. "Afti i gineka ine diki mou" - (Nini Zaha) – 2:20 – (Greek: Αυτή η γυναίκα είναι δική μου)
7. "Parelthon thelo na yinis" - (Yiannis Parios) – 3:43 – (Greek: Παρελθόν θέλω να γίνεις)

== Personnel ==
- Tolis Voskopoulos – vocals
- Marinella – background vocals
- Achilleas Theofilou – producer
- Giorgos Katsaros – arranger and conductor on tracks 3, 4, 5, 7, 10 and 11
- Nikos Lavranos – arranger and conductor on tracks 1, 2, 6, 8, 9, 12, 13 and 14
- Yiannis Smyrneos – recording engineer
- Alinta Mavrogeni – photographer
- Spyros Karachristos – artwork
