= Den Thelo Na Thimame =

Studio album by Tolis Voskopoulos
- Released: December 1982
- Recorded: Athens, studio Polysound, 12 October – 27 November 1982
- Genre: World music, Folk, Modern Laika
- Length: 37:13
- Language: Greek
- Label: Columbia, Minos EMI
- Producer: Giorgos Petsilas

Tolis Voskopoulos chronology
Kardia Mou Moni (1981)	Den Thelo Na Thimame (1982)	Eisai Dikia Mou (1983)

Den thelo na thimame (Greek: Δεν θέλω να θυμάμαι; I don't want to remember) is a studio album by Greek singer Tolis Voskopoulos. It was released in December 1982 by Columbia/Minos EMI in Greece. This album was issued in mono and stereo. The stereo version of this album was released on CD in the 1990s by EMI.

== Track listing ==
Side one.

1. "Den thelo na thimame" - (Nikos Lavranos-Varvara Tsimpouli) – 3:12 – (Greek: Δεν θέλω να θυμάμαι)
2. "Egine ki' afto" - (Tolis Voskopoulos) – 3:39 – (Greek: Έγινε κι' αυτό)
3. "Ximeroma Savvato" - (Nikos Tzavaras-Sophie Pappa) – 3:00 – (Greek: Ξημέρωμα Σάββατο)
4. "Ki' evala ta klamata" - (Tolis Voskopoulos-Sophie Pappa) – 2:31 – (Greek: Κι' έβαλα τα κλάματα)
5. "Pios eim' ego" - (Tolis Voskopoulos-Maro Bizani) – 2:44 – (Greek: Ποιος είμ' εγώ)
6. "Ehthes mou tilefonises" - (Tolis Voskopoulos-Sophie Pappa) – 3:10 – (Greek: Εχθές μου τηλεφώνησες)
7. "Esy pou irthes" - (Tolis Voskopoulos) – 2:41 – (Greek: Εσύ που ήρθες)

Side two.

1. "Mavra matia" - (Tolis Voskopoulos-Maro Bizani) – 3:15 – (Greek: Μαύρα μάτια)
2. "Hthes akoma" - (Nikos Tzavaras-Sophie Pappa) – 3:12 – (Greek: Χθες ακόμα)
3. "Matia mou thalassina" - (Nikos Lavranos-Varvara Tsimpouli) – 2:55 – (Greek: Μάτια μου θαλασσινά)
4. "Archise na vrechi" - (Tolis Voskopoulos-Sophie Pappa) – 2:38 – (Greek: Άρχισε να βρέχει)
5. "Ta onira mou" - (Tolis Voskopoulos-Maro Bizani) – 3:04 – (Greek: Τα όνειρά μου)
6. "Den thelo na thimame (Instrumental)" - (Nikos Lavranos-Varvara Tsimpouli) – 3:12 – (Greek: Δεν θέλω να θυμάμαι)

== Personnel ==
- Tolis Voskopoulos – vocals, background vocals
- Marinella – background vocals on tracks 2, 9 and 10
- Giorgos Petsilas – producer
- Nikos Lavranos – arranger, conductor
- Yiannis Smyrneos – recording engineer
- Alinta Mavrogeni – photographer
- Dimitris Th. Arvanitis – artwork
