= Jiří Vacek =

Czech writer (1931–2021)

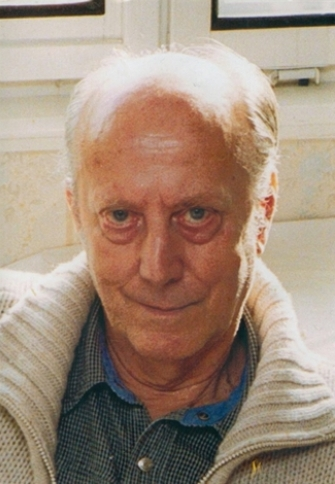
Jiří Vacek

Jiří Vacek (25 May 1931 – 27 April 2021) was a Czech mystic, writer and translator of spiritual literature.

He was active as a teacher of yoga, mysticism and non-dualistic philosophy Advaita Vedanta in the Czech Republic. His spiritual practice was based on the teachings of Sri Ramana Maharshi, the Tamil sage of Arunachala. J. Vacek is the author of the unique encyclopedia of yoga and mysticism published in the form of a book series entitled The Highest Yoga and Mysticism. His articles on spiritual practice have been published in several Czech and foreign journals. He is also an author of many CDs and DVDs on various spiritual topics. J. Vacek translated a number of works from various fields of spiritual literature into the Czech language, especially, the teachings of Ramana Maharshi as well as many other foreign works. As a promoter of yoga and mysticism, he has significantly influenced the local spiritual scene.

== Biography ==
Jiří Vacek was born in 1931 in Slaný (a town near Prague) on Whit Monday, a day belonging to Whitsuntide – a significant feast of the liturgical year (the feast of the Holy Spirit). His childhood was affected by the German occupation of Czechoslovakia during World War II, when the whole Czech nation suffered greatly under the Nazi rule.

The beginnings of his interest in the spiritual life date back to as early as 1945. The very first spiritual book J. Vacek encountered, which influenced him greatly, was the Burning Bush (subtitled the Revealed Mystic Path) by Karel Weinfurter. According to this book, J. Vacek started practising mystic exercises, namely the mantra repetition (IEOUA mantra) and silent concentration on the spiritual heart.

From the very start, he also felt attracted to the personality of Ramana Maharshi, a spiritual teacher and sage from the 19th to 20th century, whose atma-vichara (the path of Self-enquiry) J. Vacek practiced from the end of the 1950s. His other spiritual masters, whom he was personally in touch with, were Jaroslav Kočí from Ostrava and later Míla Tomášová.

During the communist regime, Jiří Vacek was interrogated by the State Security (communist secret police) owing to his spiritual interests and even sentenced for "disturbing the socialistic way of life". Consequently, he was also sacked from work a few times. Despite all that, he kept spreading both his original works and translations in the form of so-called samizdats.

After the fall of the communist regime in former Czechoslovakia in 1989, J. Vacek began to operate in public and published translations of many spiritual books, especially the works with the teachings of Ramana Maharshi and also the books dealing with the non-dualistic realization – Advaita. He even translated several works from Christianity and Zen Buddhism. Altogether, he published over 100 of his own original works and more than 30 translations from the English language.

Being retired, J. Vacek dedicated his free time to public meditations and meditations with his friends/students.

== Essence of teaching ==
What is the Path? The path lies in turning away from the changing forms to their unchanging nature, which is their source. It lies in the withdrawal of consciousness´ attention from observed objects and its turning to the observer or witness, the consciousness itself, which leads to the realization of our true Nature, the Self, as pure consciousness and destruction of the illusion that we are a being limited by mind and body – ego. This way, it leads to liberation from worldly suffering and the rebirth cycle, countless lives and deaths in it, and to the restoration of the natural and original unlimited bliss of pure being. It removes the illusion of diversity and leads to the realization of the Unity, which is the highest Truth, the Lord, the eternal life and true happiness.

The spiritual practice as presented by Jiří Vacek is primarily based on the teaching of Ramana Maharshi. Just as him, Jiří Vacek teaches that the basis of the spiritual life lies in finding our true existence in the self-aware consciousness or, in other words, in the realisation of our true Self. The easiest way how to realise our true Self is to follow the "footprint" of the observer, since it is always true that to be able to observe anything, we – consciousness, that observes or is aware of observed objects, must be present here. In the consciousness of the observer, we continuously distinguish ourselves from all the observed/observable objects, which are: our body, the creations of our mind including our feelings, and the surrounding world. Simultaneously and directly, without words or thinking, we try to realise and experience that we are the non-material consciousness, which is aware of these observed objects. This is the most important element of the spiritual practice that we can and should practice permanently, even during all of our common daily activities. By the consciousness of the self-aware observer, we introduce the divine life into our day-to-day life. Then, we do not need to divide our life into the worldly activities and the spiritual ones, although formal meditation is still the basis. We simply try to carry out with all of our activities while being consciously aware of our true Self, our divine nature. This gradually makes all our activities easier since the level of our awareness rises and we can concentrate better and better on condition that we do not forget about our Self – us being different from anything that can be observed. This practice also enables us to work on the second crucial element of the spiritual practice, which is the dissolution of vasanas, tendencies of our mind directed towards our body and our world separated/fallen off from God. This practice, focused mostly on the static aspect of the Reality, was supplemented by Jiří Vacek with another inseparable element, which is so called inner pranayama. This meditation concentrates on the divine creative power and perfectly complements static, silent meditations so that both the aspects of the Reality – static and dynamic can be developed simultaneously.

== Work ==
Jiří Vacek is the author of more than 100 original titles on various topics of yoga and mysticism and more than 30 translations from various spiritual paths and directions. Other spiritual authors often quote or draw inspiration from his writings, e.g. Vojtěch Steiner in History of Yoga or the authors of the Russian edition of Talks with Ramana Maharshi and many others.

== Public activities ==
Jiří Vacek taught the practice of the inner spiritual life in public meditations that have so far taken place in Prague, Brno, Olomouc and Hradec Králové and even all over Slovakia as well as in week-long meditation retreats that are held in various places in the Czech Republic by his friends/students.

== See also ==
- Kvetoslav Minarik
- Karel Werner
