= Otan Tragoudo =

Studio album by Tolis Voskopoulos
- Released: November, 1976
- Recorded: Athens, studio Polysound, 1976
- Genre: World music, Folk, modern laika
- Length: 32:43
- Language: Greek
- Label: Minos EMI
- Producer: Achilleas Theofilou

Tolis Voskopoulos chronology
Smyrneika Ke Laika (1976)	Otan Tragoudo (1976)	Eine To Kati Pou Meni (1977)

Otan tragoudo (Greek: Όταν τραγουδώ; When I sing) is a studio album by Greek singer Tolis Voskopoulos. It was released in November, 1976 by Minos EMI in Greece and it went gold selling over 50,000 units.

== Track listing ==
Side one.

1. "Ego agapo mia" (Εγώ αγαπώ μία) – (Nini Zaha) – 2:36
2. "Na 'tan Thee mou" (Να 'ταν Θεέ μου) feat. Marinella – (Spyros Papavasiliou – Mimis Theiopoulos) – 2:48
3. "Ine kati teties nichtes" (Είναι κάτι τέτοιες νύχτες) – (Tolis Voskopoulos – Mimis Theiopoulos) – 3:27
4. "Den katalaves kardia mou" (Δεν κατάλαβες καρδιά μου) feat. Marinella – (Tolis Voskopoulos – Mimis Theiopoulos) – 3:09
5. "Parakalo" (Παρακαλώ) – (Dimitris Christopoulos – Sakis Kapiris) – 2:26
6. "Spoudei anthropi" (Σπουδαίοι άνθρωποι) – (Kostas Hatzis – Sotia Tsotou) – 2:03

Side two.

1. "Otan tragoudo" (Όταν τραγουδώ) – (Nikos Ignatiadis – Mimis Theiopoulos) – 3:13
2. "Giati tin agapo" (Γιατί την αγαπώ) – (Nini Zaha) – 3:34
3. "Irthe i ora" (Ήρθε η ώρα) – (Tolis Voskopoulos – Manos Koufianakis) – 3:22
4. "Anazitiste tin" (Αναζητήστε την) – (Spyros Papavasiliou – Tasos Economou) – 2:51
5. "Me vrikes se adynati stigmi" (Με βρήκες σε αδύνατη στιγμή) – (Nikos Ignatiadis) – 2:33
6. "Yirna piso agapimeni" (Γύρνα πίσω αγαπημένη) – (Teris Ieremias – Mimis Theiopoulos) – 2:41

== Personnel ==
- Tolis Voskopoulos – vocals, background vocals
- Marinella – background vocals
- Achilleas Theofilou – producer
- Kostas Klavvas – arranger, conductor on tracks 3, 4, 6, 8, 9 and 12
- Nikos Ignatiadis – arranger and conductor on tracks 1, 5, 7 and 11
- Spyros Papavasiliou – arranger and conductor on tracks 2 and 10
- Yiannis Smyrneos – recording engineer
- Alinta Mavrogeni – photographer
