= Agony =

Agony may refer to:

== Concepts ==
- Suffering of intense degree, relating to physical or mental suffering
- Agony in the Garden, Christ's agony in the Garden of Gethsemane

== Comics ==
- Agony (book), a comic book by Mark Beyer
- Agony (comics), a fictional character from the Spider-Man comic books (another name for Leslie Gesneria (comics))

== Film and television ==
- Agony (TV series), a British sitcom starring Maureen Lipman
- Agony (1981 film), a Soviet film by Elem Klimov
- Agony (2020 film), an American thriller film

== Music ==
- Agony (The Tossers album), 2007
- Agony (Oppressor album), 1996
- Agony (Fleshgod Apocalypse album), 2011
- Agony (band), a Colombian metal band
- "Agony", a J-pop song by Kotoko, the ending theme for Kannazuki no Miko
- "Agony", a song from the musical Into the Woods by Stephen Sondheim
- "Agony", a song by Eels from their 2003 album Shootenanny!
- "Agony", a song by The Muffs from their 1995 album Blonder and Blonder
- "Agony", a song by Yung Lean from his 2017 album Stranger
- "Agony", a song by Slaughter to Prevail from their 2021 album Kostolom

== Video games ==
- Agony (1992 video game)
- Agony (2018 video game)

== See also ==
- Agonizer (disambiguation)
