= Halo (Soil song) =

Single by Soil

from the album Scars
- Released: 2001
- Genre: Nu metal
- Length: 3:16
- Label: J
- Songwriters: Adam Zadel; Tim King; Ryan McCombs; Tom Schofield; Shaun Glass
- Producer: Johnny K

Soil singles chronology
"Halo" (2001)	"Unreal" (2001)

Music video
- "Halo" on YouTube

"Halo" is a song by American rock band Soil and the first single from their 2001 studio album Scars. The video is filmed in a rundown house, lit by lamps and sunlight through boarded-up windows. Towards the end of the video, the band can be seen walking on the walls and ceiling, when their instruments begin to break, seemingly through the violence of their performance. "Halo" is listed as the top Soil song on iTunes.

== Track listing ==
1. "Halo" (radio mix) – 2:53
2. "Center" (previously unreleased) – 2:53
3. "Halo" (Arms remix) – 2:53
4. "Halo" (music video) – 2:58

== Charts ==
Chart (2001–2002)	Peak position
Scotland Singles (Official Charts)	89
UK Singles (Official Charts)	74
UK Rock & Metal (Official Charts)	8
US Mainstream Rock Tracks (Billboard)	22
