= Redefine (Soil album) =

Studio album by Soil
- Released: March 23, 2004
- Recorded: 2003
- Studio: Groovemaster Studios (Chicago); Sound City Studios (Van Nuys, California)
- Genre: Alternative metal; nu metal; hard rock; post-grunge
- Length: 38:59
- Label: J Records
- Producer: Johnny K, Nick Raskulinecz

Soil chronology
Scars (2001)	Redefine (2004)	True Self (2006)

Singles from Redefine
- 1. "Redefine" Released: February 17, 2004

Professional ratings
Review scores
Source	Rating
AllMusic	link
Kerrang!	3/5 stars

Redefine (also styled as re·de·fine) is the third studio album by American rock band Soil. It was released on March 23, 2004 via J Records. Redefine was Soil's final album with vocalist Ryan McCombs before he left the band in October that year. He would later rejoin the band in 2011. It was also Soil's last release through J Records after the band was dropped following the Sony/BMG merger.

The album peaked at number 78 on the Billboard 200 chart, selling 14,454 copies in its first week. and included the single and video for "Redefine" which charted higher than any previous single of the band. The track "Pride" was featured in the video game Madden NFL 2004. According to the album booklet, the track "Remember" was dedicated to the memory of Dave Williams, the original lead singer of Drowning Pool.

== Touring ==
Soil toured for a year in promotion of Redefine which included a European schedule with Drowning Pool and Damageplan. Touring ended in late 2004 when Ryan McCombs suddenly left the group. This forced the cancelation of future shows including a mini tour with Sevendust, a festival with Damageplan, and a UK tour. Soil was also scheduled to perform with Damageplan on December 10 of the same year, but ultimately did not, due to the murder of Damageplan guitarist Dimebag Darrell two days earlier.

== Track listing ==
All tracks are written by Soil

No.	Title	Length
1.	"Pride"	2:44
2.	"Redefine"	3:37
3.	"Can You Heal Me"	3:31
4.	"Cross My Heart"	3:15
5.	"Suffering"	3:16
6.	"Remember"	3:38
7.	"Deny Me"	3:32
8.	"Something Real"	3:07
9.	"Say You Will"	3:02
10.	"Love Hate Game"	3:19
11.	"Obsession"	4:58

== Personnel ==
=== Soil ===
- Ryan McCombs – lead vocals
- Adam Zadel – lead guitar, backing vocals
- Shaun Glass – rhythm guitar
- Tim King – bass guitar
- Tom Schofield – drums

=== Other ===
- Johnny K – production and engineering
- Nick Raskulinecz – production and engineering of the songs "Pride" and "Something Real"
- Randy Staub – mixing
- Tom Baker – mastering

== Chart positions ==
=== Album ===
Year	Chart	Position
2004	Billboard 200	78

=== Singles ===
Year	Single	Chart	Position
2004	"Redefine"	Mainstream Rock Tracks	11
