= Smyrneika Ke Laika =

Studio album by Tolis Voskopoulos
- Released: March, 1976
- Recorded: Athens, 1976
- Genre: World music, folk, modern laika
- Length: 34:13
- Language: Greek
- Label: Minos EMI
- Producer: Achilleas Theofilou

Tolis Voskopoulos chronology
| Ego Ti Eho Ke Ti Tha 'Ho (1975) | Smyrneika Ke Laika (1976) | Otan Tragoudo (1976) |

Smyrneika Ke Laika (Greek: Σμυρναίικα και λαϊκά) is a studio album by Greek singer Tolis Voskopoulos. It was released in March, 1976 by Minos EMI in Greece.

== Track listing ==
Side one.

1. "Ah, Vaggelitsa mou" feat. Marinella - (Tolis Voskopoulos-Mimis Theiopoulos) – 2:43 – (Greek: Αχ, Βαγγελίτσα μου)
2. "Prin chathi to oniro mas" feat. Marinella - (Tolis Voskopoulos-Mimis Theiopoulos) – 3:18 – (Greek: Πριν χαθεί το όνειρό μας)
3. "Den tha kimithis" feat. Marinella - (Tolis Voskopoulos-Mimis Theiopoulos) – 2:45 – (Greek: Δεν θα κοιμηθείς)
4. "Pexe file to santouri" feat. Marinella - (Tolis Voskopoulos-Mimis Theiopoulos) – 3:08 – (Greek: Παίξε φίλε το σαντούρι)
5. "Na 'tane leei macharayas" feat. Marinella - (Tolis Voskopoulos-Mimis Theiopoulos) – 2:26 – (Greek: Να 'τανε λέει μαχαραγιάς)
6. "O chamatzis" - (Tolis Voskopoulos-Mimis Theiopoulos) – 2:41 – (Greek: Ο χαματζής)

Side two.

1. "O arabatzis" feat. Marinella - (Vasilis Vasiliadis-Takis Kolettis) – 3:24 – (Greek: Ο αραμπατζής)
2. "To varichimono" feat. Marinella - (Vasilis Vasiliadis-Takis Kolettis) – 3:39 – (Greek: Το βαρυχείμωνο)
3. "Ainte yia dio matia" feat. Marinella - (Vasilis Vasiliadis-Takis Kolettis) – 3:05 – (Greek: Άιντε για δυο μάτια)
4. "Ta maryiolika sou matia" - (Vasilis Vasiliadis-Takis Kolettis) – 3:07 – (Greek: Τα μαργιόλικα σου μάτια)
5. "Ston kafene kathomouna" - (Vasilis Vasiliadis-Takis Kolettis) – 2:49 – (Greek: Στον καφενέ καθόμουνα)
6. "Na 'tan i agkalia sou fylaki" feat. Marinella - (Vasilis Vasiliadis-Takis Kolettis) – 3:08 – (Greek: Να 'ταν η αγκαλιά σου φυλακή)

== Personnel ==
- Tolis Voskopoulos – vocals
- Marinella – background vocals
- Achilleas Theofilou – producer
