= Agonizer (disambiguation) =

Agonizer may refer to:

- Agonizer, a Finnish heavy metal band
- Agonizer, a device in "Mirror, Mirror" (Star Trek: The Original Series)
- Agonizer, an Imperial Star Destroyer in Star Wars

== See also ==
- Agony (disambiguation)
