= Kardia Mou Moni =

Studio album by Tolis Voskopoulos
- Released: December, 1981
- Recorded: Athens, studio Polysound, 1981
- Genre: World music, Folk, Modern Laika
- Language: Greek
- Label: Minos EMI
- Producer: Achilleas Theofilou

Tolis Voskopoulos chronology
80 (1980)	Kardia Mou Moni (1981)	Den Thelo Na Thimame (1982)

Kardia mou moni… (Greek: Καρδιά μου μόνη…; My lonely heart…) is a studio album by Greek singer Tolis Voskopoulos. It was released in December, 1981 by Minos EMI in Greece and it went gold selling over 50,000 units. The original release was in stereo on vinyl and cassette. This album was re-issued on CD in the 1990s by Minos EMI.

== Track listing ==
Side one.

1. "Ainte stin iyia tis" feat. Marinella - (Thanasis Polykandriotis-Yiannis Parios) – 3:18 – (Greek: Άιντε στην υγειά της)
2. "Milas ki' esy" - (Yiannis Parios) – 4:39 – (Greek: Μιλάς κι' εσύ)
3. "Mia margarita madisa" feat. Marinella - (Thanasis Polykandriotis-Yiannis Parios) – 3:33 – (Greek: Μια μαργαρίτα μάδησα)
4. "Ela mou" feat. Marinella - (Thanasis Polykandriotis-Ilias Lymperopoulos) – 2:51 – (Greek: Έλα μου)
5. "Na sou thimiso" feat. Marinella - (Thanasis Polykandriotis-Ilias Lymperopoulos) – 3:12 – (Greek: Να σου θυμίσω)
6. "Ke sou icha tosi agapi" - (Tolis Voskopoulos-Sophie Pappa) – 3:12 – (Greek: Και σου είχα τόση αγάπη)

Side two.

1. "Kardia mou moni" - (Yiannis Parios) – 4:44 – (Greek: Καρδιά μου μόνη)
2. "Ine pou fevgis" feat. Marinella - (Tolis Voskopoulos-Sophie Pappa) – 3:29 – (Greek: Είναι που φεύγεις)
3. "Chelidona mou" feat. Marinella - (Thanasis Polykandriotis-Yiannis Parios) – 3:28 – (Greek: Χελιδόνα μου)
4. "Tin porta mou chtipoun i anamnisis" feat. Marinella - (Katerina Korou-Vaso Zaimi) – 3:26 – (Greek: Την πόρτα μου χτυπούν οι αναμνήσεις)
5. "Ti sas fteo" - (Thanasis Polykandriotis-Sophie Pappa) – 2:31 – (Greek: Τι σας φταίω)
6. "Se skeftome" - (Tolis Voskopoulos-Yiannis Parios) – 3:42 – (Greek: Σε σκέφτομαι)

== Personnel ==
- Tolis Voskopoulos – vocals
- Marinella – background vocals
- Achilleas Theofilou – producer
- Nestoras Danas – arranger, conductor
- Yiannis Smyrneos – recording engineer
- Alinta Mavrogeni – photographer
