= Angela Gerekou =

Greek politician, actress and architect

- Άντζελα Γκερέκου
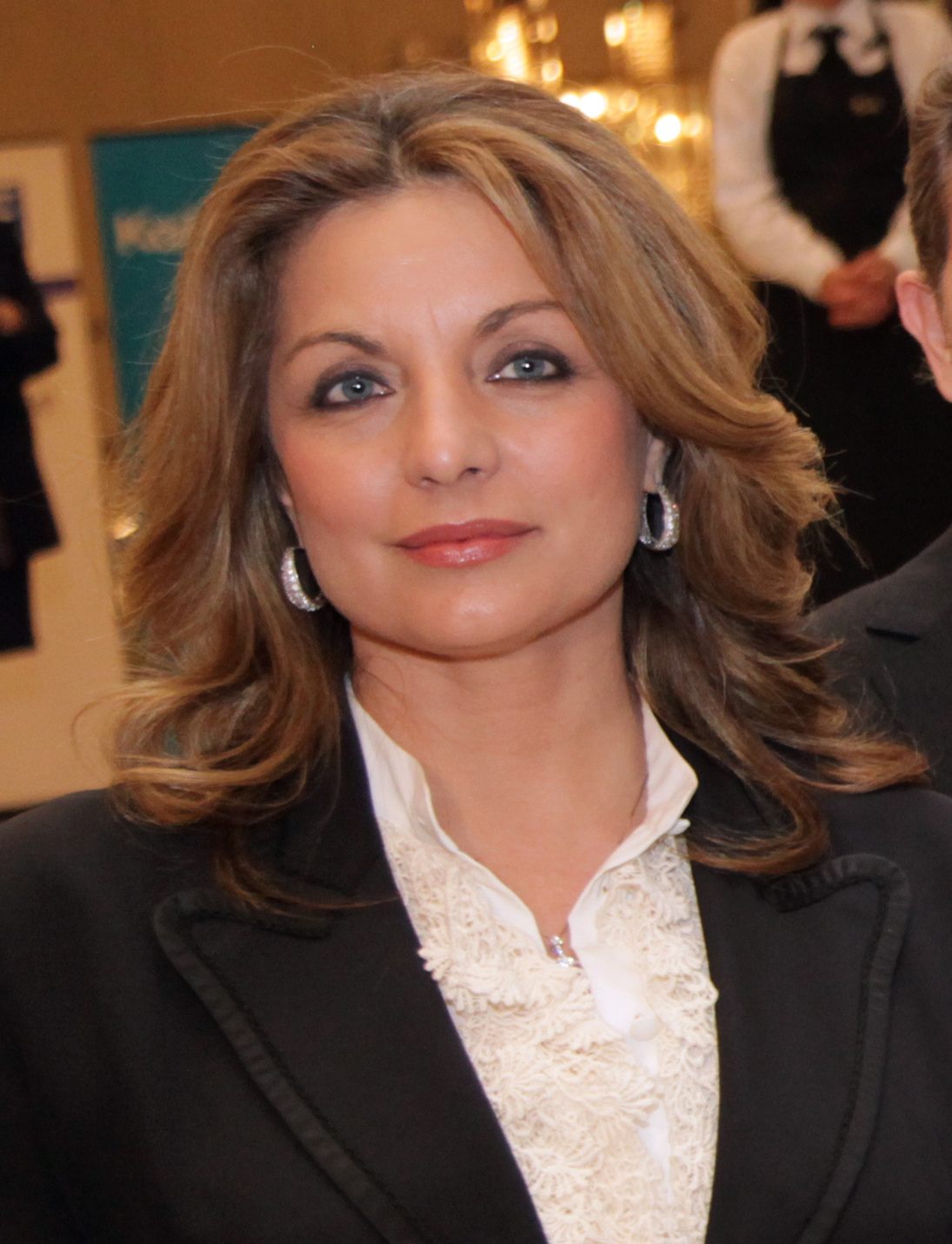

President of GNTO
- Incumbent
- Assumed office August 1, 2019
- Prime Minister: Kyriakos Mitsotakis; Ioannis Sarmas (caretaker); Kyriakos Mitsotakis
- Preceded by: Charalambos Karimalis

Deputy Minister for Culture and Tourism
- In office June 9, 2014 – January 27, 2015
- Prime Minister: Antonis Samaras
- Minister: Olga Kefalogianni
- In office October 7, 2009 – May 18, 2010
- Prime Minister: George Papandreou
- Minister: Pavlos Geroulanos

Personal details
- Born: March 26, 1959 (age 67) Corfu, Greece
- Party: New Democracy (2015–)
- Other political affiliations: PASOK (2004–2015)
- Spouse: Tolis Voskopoulos
- Children: Maria Voskopoulou

Angela Gerekou (Greek: Άντζελα Γκερέκου; born March 26, 1959) is a Greek actress and politician. Currently serving as President of Greek National Tourism Organization (GNTO) since 2019.

She served as Deputy Minister of the Ministry of Culture and Sport from 2014 to 2015 and from 2009 to 2010. Also served as MP for the Hellenic Parliament from 2004 to 2012.

== Biography ==
=== Early life ===
Angela Gerekou was born on March 26, 1959, in Corfu, in the Ionian Sea, Greece.

=== Movie career ===
Her good looks got her noticed in the 1980s by producers and directors of the then-flourishing Greek cinema.

=== Politician ===
Angela Gerekou served as Deputy Minister of the Ministry of Culture and Sport in the cabinet of George Papandreou from 2009 to 2010.

=== Personal life ===
Angela Gerekou married Greek actor and singer Tolis Voskopoulos, with whom she had a daughter named Maria in 2001.

== Filmography ==
=== Film ===
Year	Title	Role	Notes	Ref.
1986	Strange Meeting	Anna	Film debut	
1986	The girl from Mani	Eleni Kalea		
1990	The sweep	Tara		
1994	The moon fugitive	Andrianna		
1994	Terra incognita			
1996	Acropol	Zozo		
1997	Balkanska pravila	Mariya		
1997	The smell of the time			

=== Television ===
Year	Title	Role(s)	Notes
1990–1992	In the shadow of money		Lead role / 85 episodes
1992	One woman from the past	Nafsika	Lead role / 16 episodes
1992–1993	The sound of silence	Miranda Danezi	Lead role / 77 episodes
1993	Moral Department		Episode: "The particular tastes of the principal manager"
1993–1994	Games without borders	Herself (host)	Season 1
1994–1995	Daring Love Stories	Herself (host)	20 episodes
1995	Magical Night	Alexandra	Episode: "Deep sea"
1995–1996	Fitting of the wedding dress	Olga Deli	Lead role / 25 episodes
1996	Guilty Love	Stella	Lead role / 15 episodes
2004–2005	The children of Niobe	Madame Zizi	Lead role / 18 episodes
2021–present	The land of olive	Athena Nomikou	Lead role
