= Ego Ti Eho Ke Ti Tha 'Ho =

Studio album by Tolis Voskopoulos
- Released: 1975
- Recorded: Athens, 1975, studio Columbia
- Genre: World music, folk, modern laika
- Length: 32:18
- Language: Greek
- Label: Minos EMI
- Producer: Achilleas Theofilou

Tolis Voskopoulos chronology
| Marinella & Tolis Voskopoulos – Ego Ki' Esy (1974) | Ego Ti Eho Ke Ti Tha 'Ho (1975) | Smyrneika Ke Laika (1976) |

Ego ti eho ke ti tha 'ho (Greek: Εγώ τι έχω και τι θα 'χω; What I have and what I'll have) is a studio album by Greek singer Tolis Voskopoulos. It was released in 1975 by Minos EMI in Greece.

== Track listing ==
Side one.

1. "Ego ti echo ke ti tha 'cho" (Εγώ τι έχω και τι θα 'χω; What I have and what I'll have?) feat. Marinella – (Giorgos Krimizakis – Sotia Tsotou) – 2:53
2. "Se ti kosmo vrethika" (Σε τι κόσμο βρέθηκα; In what world I live?) – (Giorgos Krimizakis) – 3:29
3. "An ixeres" (Αν ήξερες; If you knew) feat. Marinella – (Tolis Voskopoulos – Mimis Theiopoulos) – 2:51
4. "Tou chronou tetia mera" (Του χρόνου τέτοια μέρα; Next year, same day) – (Giorgos Krimizakis – Sotia Tsotou) – 3:24
5. "Kopse tin klosti" (Κόψε την κλωστή; Sever the thread) – (Teris Ieremias – Mimis Theiopoulos) – 2:45
6. "Den peirazi" (Δεν πειράζει; No matter) feat. Rena Panta – (Stelios Zafeiriou – Pythagoras) – 2:41

Side two.

1. "Dio kardies" (Δυο καρδιές; Two hearts) – (Teris Ieremias – Mimis Theiopoulos) – 2:01
2. "Rotise na mathis" (Ρώτησε να μάθεις; Asked to learn) feat. Rena Panta – (Tolis Voskopoulos – Mimis Theiopoulos) – 2:41
3. "Pia ise 'sy" (Ποια είσαι 'συ; Who are you?) – (Tolis Voskopoulos – Mimis Theiopoulos) – 2:21
4. "Imaste anthropi apli" (Είμαστε άνθρωποι απλοί; We're simple people) – (Giorgos Krimizakis – Sotia Tsotou) – 2:51
5. "Ti eyines" (Τι έγινες; What happened to you?) – (Tolis Voskopoulos – Mimis Theiopoulos) – 3:13
6. "Giati den erchese" (Γιατί δεν έρχεσαι; Why don't you come over?) – (Stelios Zafeiriou – Pythagoras) – 3:08

== Personnel ==
- Tolis Voskopoulos – vocals, background vocals
- Marinella – background vocals
- Rena Panta – background vocals
- Achilleas Theofilou – producer
