= Scars (Soil album) =

Studio album by Soil
- Released: September 11, 2001
- Recorded: 2001 at Groovemaster Studios in Chicago, Illinois
- Genre: Nu metal
- Length: 43:14
- Label: J
- Producer: Johnny K

Soil chronology
Throttle Junkies (1999)	Scars (2001)	Redefine (2004)

Singles from Scars
- 1. "Halo" Released: 2001; 2. "Unreal" Released: 2002; 3. "Breaking Me Down" Released: 2002

Scars is the second studio album by American rock band Soil, released on September 11, 2001, via J Records. It was the band's major label debut, and J Records' first rock album.

The album's lead single, "Halo", peaked at number 22 on the Billboard Mainstream Rock Chart and number 74 in the United Kingdom, becoming the band's breakthrough single. Although the album only managed to peak at number 193 on the US Billboard 200 chart and number 150 on the UK Albums Chart, Scars proved to be Soil's greatest commercial success, having sold 222,000 copies in the United States by July 2004. The album was also certified Silver by the British Phonographic Industry (BPI) in 2011, representing the sale of 60,000 copies in the UK.

== Background and recording ==
After the release of Soil's first album, Throttle Junkies, MIA Records closed. The band started writing new material and, with the help of Johnny K, fleshed out several tracks. A three-song demo of "My Own", "Need to Feel" and "Halo" was recorded in three days of August 2000 and was plugged on the Demo Diaries website. "Halo", with its aggressive hook, gained the attention of the radio programmer Pat Lynch of Orlando, Florida, and he gave the song considerable exposure on his active rock station WJRR. Within months, it became the station's most requested song and caught the attention of various major labels. In March 2001, after visiting four potential candidates (RCA, J, Elektra, Warner Bros), Soil became the first rock band signed to J Records who soon offered Orlando fans a free Soil sampler. At this point, Soil had already recorded more than enough material for an album and were eager to begin work on what became Scars. J Records' president, Clive Davis, told the band that "you're gonna be my only rock band for now. You're going to be a priority, and I want to break this band."

Bass guitarist Tim King noted how quickly J Records moved to maintain the momentum provided by WJRR: "Everything just fell into place so fast. What normally takes three months, we did in about three weeks. I have to say, J Records stepped up to the plate and did it like they had three months. It's amazing how professional and how hard working they are and what they did to get everything moving."

The band originally had 28 songs which were narrowed to 18 or 20 for pre-production. After further narrowing them down to about 15 or 20, votes were taken to decide a final track list. Two of the three initial demo tracks were simply remixed while "My Own" was left untouched. Two outtakes, "Damaged You" and "Center", were recorded during the Scars sessions and the band expressed hopes of seeing them possibly released on soundtracks. The song "Center" appeared on the Japanese version of the album and both tracks were included on the digital 10th anniversary re-release of Scars in 2011.

== Music and lyrics ==
Scars has an array of bleak lyrics often dealing with personal troubles. The vocalist, Ryan McCombs, noted, "All the lyrics that I write are about things that I've experienced in life. All the songs really touch home for me personally." He added that some songs proved difficult to perform in concert because of their intimate nature. A particular shift in both lyrics and tone is shown in "The One", an anxious, up tempo plea for the mending of an old friendship. McCombs described the lyrical meaning behind "Unreal" as "the amount of control, or better, the lack of control one seems to have over his/her own life at times... and the feeling that maybe there is a higher power out there and if there is, he clearly doesn't give a fuck about me now or the times you seem to need a little help the most."

McCombs explained the meaning of the album title in a 2001 interview: "It means what it says. It's just scars. [...] The title, to me, encompasses the entire album. Each song as an individual is a scar on the psyche or mentally and emotionally. I think the title really fits the whole body of work."

== Touring and promotion ==
Soil began touring in August 2001 to promote Scars. They were scheduled to perform at The Metro in Chicago on the date of the album's release, but this was rescheduled because of the September 11 terrorist attacks in New York. Soil took part in the Merry Mayhem tour with Ozzy Osbourne, Rob Zombie, and Mudvayne in late 2001. They began 2002 by touring with Soulfly, Static-X and Onesidezero in the US. That spring, Soil went to Europe with Adema before joining Sevendust for five weeks. They performed as a Second Stage act on Ozzfest 2002 where Zakk Wylde performed "Halo" with the band.

Soil's second album gave the band a foothold in the mainstream scene with the singles "Halo" and "Unreal". Both songs had music videos which were shown on MTV2 and MMUSA. The lead single's video depicts the band performing in a rundown house filled with youngsters dancing to the song. The crumbling, dust filled house is lit primarily by lamps and sunlight piercing through the boarded up windows. Band members are seen walking across the walls and ceiling and breaking their instruments - including a metal cymbal - through the sheer violence of their performance.

The video for the band's second single, "Unreal", was directed by Marc Webb. The bleak lyrics depict rage and betrayal and were shot in what the guitarist Adam Zadel described as an "old, decrepit looking" Los Angeles alley with "a bunch of dirty kids everywhere". A bright light and fog flood the alley to create a washed-out atmosphere among fans rapidly waving large flags. The video also makes use of corroded film effects.

In the fall of 2011, seven years after the departure of the vocalist Ryan McCombs, Soil reunited with their original lead singer for the Scars 10th Anniversary Tour with Puddle of Mudd in the United Kingdom. A 10th anniversary edition of Scars was also released digitally through Sony Music on October 10, 2011. This includes two bonus tracks recorded during the Scars sessions.

== Reception ==
=== Commercial success ===
The album and its first two singles entered charts in both the US and UK. "Halo" found its way to the Active Rock Top 20 while "Unreal" was a most-added track at Active Rock on release. It had sold 222,000 copies in the United States by July 2004. Around its tenth anniversary in 2011, the album gained Silver status in the UK. Scars was Soil's most successful release.

=== Critical response ===
Professional ratings
Review scores
Source	Rating
AllMusic	3/5 stars
Blabbermouth.net	7.5/10
Blender	2/5 stars
Classic Rock	4/5 stars
Kerrang!	4/5 stars

Awarding 3 out of 5 stars, AllMusic's Jason D. Taylor called Scars a "straight-up rock & roll album, albiet [sic] with a modern twist." He added that despite "evident commercial appeal," the songs have a "refreshing coarse grittiness" among typical radio singles. Taylor summed up by commenting, "Soil may not appeal to those looking for the latest in hip-hop/metal, but for those wishing a band would come along who could induce the feelings that Appetite for Destruction or Metallica's Black album once did, Scars is for you."

Borivoj Krgin of Blabbermouth.net called Scars "an impressive album that deserves to be heard" among the dominating "sugar-coated brand of pimprock and more eclectic form of nu-metal." He regarded the album as a continuation of the sound first heard on Throttle Junkies, only with a "more streamlined, focused" and consequently more commercial approach. He added, "the material is consistently strong, if not all-out amazing" and praised the guitar work of Shaun Glass and Adam Zadel as well as the "throaty delivery" of Ryan McCombs for dropping its blatant Layne Staley inspiration.

In a brief review, Bill Ribas of NY Rock praised Clive Davis' choice for J Records' first heavy metal band and compared McCombs' voice to "a cross between Rob Zombie and an angry Eddie Vedder."

In a negative review, Blender (magazine) found that the album "jolts from one verse-chorus-verse dirge to the next, the stone-cold Seattle sound taken apart and rebuilt by amateurs".

Scars was named Metal Hammer Album of the Year for 2002. It also received praise from the likes of Entertainment Weekly, CMJ, Revolver and Metal Edge.

== Track listing ==
All tracks are written by Soil.

No.	Title	Length
1.	"Breaking Me Down"	2:35
2.	"Halo"	3:16
3.	"Need to Feel"	3:39
4.	"Wide Open"	3:25
5.	"Understanding Me"	2:57
6.	"My Own"	3:43
7.	"Unreal"	3:15
8.	"Inside"	3:17
9.	"Two Skins"	2:58
10.	"The One"	2:49
11.	"New Faith"	3:16
12.	"Why"	2:59
13.	"Black 7"	4:59
Total length:		43:07

Expanded edition bonus tracks
No.	Title	Length
14.	"Center" (B-side) (standard Japanese release bonus track)	2:53
15.	"Damaged You" (previously unreleased)	3:52
Total length:		49:53

Japan bonus tracks
No.	Title	Length
14.	"Road to Ruin" (from Throttle Junkies)	2:38
15.	"Hellow Again" (from Throttle Junkies) (originally titled "Hello Again")	3:19
16.	"Crucified" (from Throttle Junkies)	4:34
Total length:		53:38

== Personnel ==
- Ryan McCombs – lead vocals
- Adam Zadel – lead guitar, backing vocals
- Shaun Glass – rhythm guitar
- Tim King – bass
- Tom Schofield – drums

Production

- Johnny K – production
- Cladius Mittendrofer – assistant mix engineering
- George Marino – mastering
- James Diener – A&R

== Charts ==
=== Album ===
Year	Chart	Position
2001	US Billboard 200	193
2001	Heatseekers	10
2001	UK Albums Chart	150

=== Singles ===
Year	Single	Chart	Position
2001	"Halo"	US Hot Mainstream Rock Tracks	18
2001	"Halo"	UK Singles Chart	74
2002	"Unreal"	US Hot Mainstream Rock Tracks	31
2002	"Unreal"	UK Singles Chart	113

== Certifications ==
Region	Certification	Certified units/sales
United Kingdom (BPI)	Silver	60,000^{*}
^{*} Sales figures based on certification alone.
