= Whole (Soil album) =

Studio album by SOiL
- Released: August 16, 2013; August 20, 2013 (UK/Europe)
- Recorded: 2013 at Wilderness Studios in Los Angeles, California, 2013 at Bota Studios in Crystal Lake, Illinois
- Genre: Alternative metal; hard rock
- Length: 37:35
- Label: Pavement Music, AFM Records
- Producer: Ulrich Wild

SOiL chronology
Picture Perfect (2009)	Whole (2013)	Scream: The Essentials (2017)

Whole is the sixth studio album by American rock band SOiL, released in August 2013. It is the first album since 2004 to feature Ryan McCombs as lead vocalist, having returned to the band in 2011. The album was funded through Kickstarter, with the song "My Time" released exclusively for backers on December 10, 2012. The album version of "My Time" was changed slightly, while the Kickstarter version of the song was re-released in the compilation album Scream: The Essentials. A lyric video for the song "Amalgamation" was released on August 9, 2013 to promote the album. Whole features three singles, "Shine On", "The Hate Song" and "Way Gone". Additionally, a music video was produced for "Shine On".

== Track listing ==
All tracks are written by SOiL.

No.	Title	Length
1.	"Loaded Gun"	2:53
2.	"The Hate Song"	3:12
3.	"Ugly"	3:46
4.	"Way Gone"	3:32
5.	"Psychopath"	2:43
6.	"Shine On"	3:24
7.	"Wake Up"	3:15
8.	"Amalgamation"	3:35
9.	"My Time"	3:04
10.	"Little Liar"	3:34
11.	"One Love"	4:48
Total length:		37:35

== Personnel ==
=== SOiL ===
- Ryan McCombs – lead vocals
- Tim King – bass guitar, backing vocals
- Adam Zadel – lead guitar, backing vocals

=== Additional musicians ===
- Will Hunt – drums
- Mitch Gable – drums on "My Time"
- Mike Mushok – guitar solo on "Wake Up"

=== Production ===
- Ulrich Wild – producer, engineer, and mixer
- Don Byczynski – recording and engineering for the song "My Time"
- James Murphy – mastering
