= Solstice of Oppression =

Studio album by Oppressor
- Released: April 9, 1994
- Studio: Break Through Audio (Chicago)
- Genre: Technical death metal
- Length: 41:43
- Label: Red Light
- Producers: Ron Reid, Jim Harvey

Oppressor chronology
Oppressor (1994)	Solstice of Oppression (1994)	Oppression Live/As Blood Flows (1995)

Professional ratings
Review scores
Source	Rating
Allmusic	2.5/5 stars

Solstice of Oppression is the first studio release by technical death metal band Oppressor. It was released on April 9, 1994.

AllMusic cited the track "Genocide" as the album's highlight.

== Music ==
The instrumentation on Solstice of Oppression is technically demanding and the arrangements are considered to be complex. The track "Prelude to Death" acts as an "atmospheric intro" to the following track "Genocide", according to AllMusic. Some sections employ acoustic guitars. The album's lyrical topics include blood and the lower gastrointestinal tract.

== Reception ==
Eduardo Rivadavia of AllMusic gave the album two and a half stars out of five. He called it "a technically proficient but rather samey death metal effort." He continued: "All told, there are no real surprises here, but plenty of blood and guts to ruin Thanksgiving dinner nonetheless."

== Track listing ==
All lyrics are written by Tim King; all music is composed by Jim Stopper and Adam Zadel.

No.	Title	Length
1.	"Seasons"	5:27
2.	"Eclipse into Eternity"	4:40
3.	"Devour the Soul"	5:04
4.	"And the Angels Fell (The Suffering)"	4:49
5.	"Prelude to Death"	1:13
6.	"Genocide"	5:37
7.	"Rotted Paradise"	5:38
8.	"As Blood Flows"	4:07
9.	"Dying Inside"	5:06
Total length:		41:43

2000 remastered edition bonus tracks
No.	Title	Length
10.	"Valley of Thorns" (Demo)	5:32
11.	"I Am Darkness" (Demo)	4:40

== Personnel ==
Oppressor

- Tim King – vocals, bass
- Adam Zadel – lead guitar, acoustic guitar
- Jim Stopper – rhythm guitar, 12-string acoustic guitar
- Tom Schofield – drums

Production

- Ron Reid – engineering, producer
- Jim Harvey – engineering, producer
- SV Bell – cover art
- Greg Derbas – layout
- Brad Hall – photography
