= Edward Collins Vacek =

Edward Collins Vacek, SJ is a Jesuit priest and academic who teaches Catholic Studies at Loyola University New Orleans.

== Education ==
Vacek earned his doctorate in Philosophy from Northwestern University, and holds the Stephen Duffy Chair in Systematic Theology at Loyola University New Orleans. He teaches Christian Ethics, Christian Love and Christian Theologies.

== Publications ==
Vacek has over 60 academic publications, including one book:

- Vacek, Edward Collins (1994). Love, Human and Divine: The Heart of Christian Ethics. Georgetown University Press.

== Reflections ==
In Love, Technology and Theology, Midson points out that Vacek argues: "those who do not recognize their own self-interestedness are usually involved in broad and profound self-deception."

Wong observes of Vacek 1) that God shows preference for Israel in the Old Testament and that thus God's love is preferential. Vacek goes on to say that God's retribution towards to them (again in the OT) is because He is undeceived by them. Preferential love is thus a natural consequence of God's freedom to do what He wants with His creation.

Vacek, for Jackson, holds the opinion that "love has not been central in most Christian ethics and dogmatic theology."

Vacek and others point out for Dillen that by creating a cycle of reciprocity, eros "can counteract agape's tendency to deplete itself."
