= Agonia (1969 film) =

- Directed by: Odysseas Kosteletos
- Produced by: Nikos Papadopoulos
- Starring: Tolis Voskopoulos; Eleni Anousaki; Despina Nikolaidou
- Cinematography: Nikos Milos
- Music by: Christos Mouramas
- Release date: 1969
- Country: Greece
- Language: Greek

Agonia is a 1969 Greek drama film directed by Odysseas Kosteletos.

== Cast ==
- Tolis Voskopoulos as Alexis Karnezis
- Eleni Anousaki as Anna Antoniou
- Despoina Nikolaidou as Kaiti Andreou
- Lavrentis Dianellos as Petros Karnezis
- Thodoros Exarhos as Christidis
- Nassos Kedrakas as Kaiti's friend
- Vilma Kyrou as Christina
- Giorgos Nezos as Maratos
- Dimitris Koukis as Renos
- Elpida Braoudaki as Mary
