= True Self =

Studio album by SOiL
- Released: May 2, 2006
- Recorded: October–November 2005
- Studio: Bombshelter Studios (Los Angeles, CA); Glenwood Studios (Burbank, CA)
- Genre: Alternative metal, hard rock
- Length: 43:29
- Label: DRT Entertainment
- Producer: Ulrich Wild

SOiL chronology
Redefine (2004)	True Self (2006)	Picture Perfect (2009)

Professional ratings
Review scores
Source	Rating
AllMusic	link
Brave Words & Bloody Knuckles	4/10
Metal.de	5/10

True Self is the fourth studio album by American rock band SOiL, first released in the U.S. on May 2, 2006. It is the band's first album with new vocalist A.J. Cavalier, former member of World in Pain and Diesel Machine, and their last album to feature rhythm guitarist Shaun Glass. The album was leaked onto P2P and BitTorrent sites on March 4, almost two months before its official release. The album sold 4,000 copies in the U.S. during its first week of release.

A music video was filmed for "Give It Up" and released shortly before the album.

In promotion of the album, Soil did a European/US tour with Staind, US tours with Sevendust, 10 Years and Godsmack, as well as numerous UK and European festival and headline tours. Soil ended the cycle with their summer 2007 True Rock tour.

== Track listing ==
All tracks were recorded at Bombshelter Studios in Los Angeles, California, except Give It Up, Hear Me, Until It's Over and Jaded, which were recorded at Glenwood Studios, Burbank, California.

No.	Title	Guest vocals	Length
1.	"Fight for Life"		4:10
2.	"Give It Up"	Wayne Static of Static-X	3:00
3.	"Pick Me Up"		3:12
4.	"The Last Chance"		4:17
5.	"True Self"		3:18
6.	"Hear Me"		3:57
7.	"Forever Dead"	Burton C. Bell of Fear Factory	3:12
8.	"Let Go"		3:49
9.	"Until It's Over"		2:58
10.	"Jaded"		2:37
11.	"Threw It Away"		3:27
12.	"One Last Song"		5:28
Total length:			43:25

== Personnel ==
=== SOiL ===
- AJ Cavalier – lead vocals
- Adam Zadel – lead guitar, backing vocals
- Shaun Glass – rhythm guitar
- Tim King – bass guitar
- Tom Schofield – drums

=== Other ===
- Wayne Static – guest vocals on "Give It Up"
- Burton C. Bell – guest vocals on "Forever Dead"
- Stephen Jensen – art director, designer, photographer
- Shaun Nowotnik – assistant to Stephen Jensen
- Brian Vecchione – band photography
- Ulrich Wild – producer, engineer, mixer
- Ted Jensen – mastering
