= Květoslav Minařík =

Czech yogi and mystic

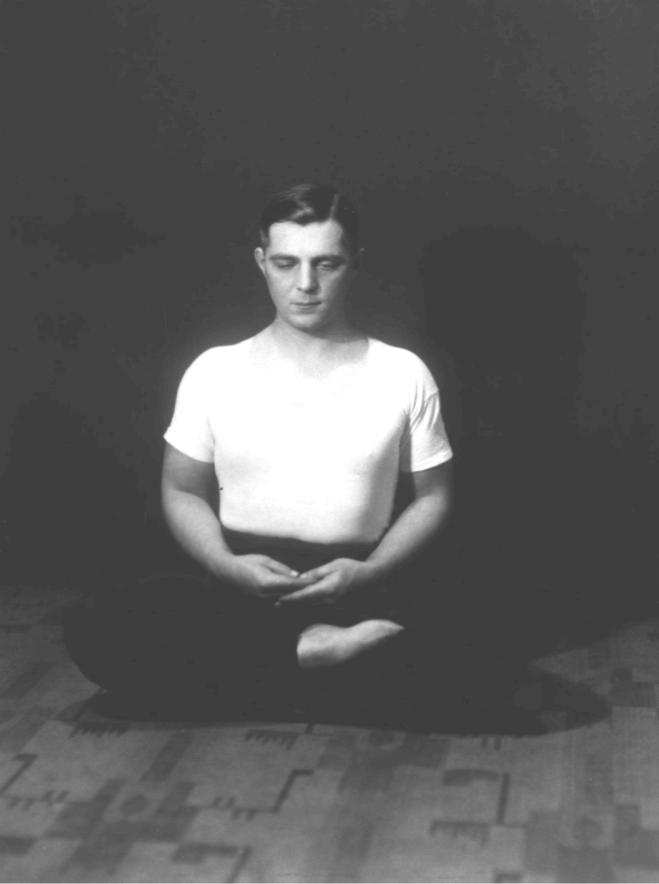
Minařík in 1939

Květoslav Minařík (21 February 1908 – 4 July 1974) was a Czech yogi and mystic.

== Life ==
Minařík was born on 21 February 1908 in Litvínov, Bohemia, Austria-Hungary. His interest of yoga started at 1925 and after one and half year he recognized and to the deepest details personally realized the highest ideals of the Orient, without losing contact with his civic life. Later he formulated his direct experience as an original (not learned from books) spiritual teaching which is based on the psychology and mentality of a contemporary European. The teaching he formulated guides its followers through their life improving their whole being; it does not deal with just the physical, moral or mental component but it harmoniously develops all of them at once. In view of the world's foremost religions his teaching is closest to the Mahayana Buddhism. In his books Minařík explains the spiritual teachings from a different viewpoint to make them comprehensible to a broad range of readers. Almost entire life opus has already been published by Canopus publishing house.

Books of Květoslav Minařík, however, have not yet been published systematically in any other language, only in Czech. There are two books published in German – The Direct Path and The Inner meaning of the New Testament and one in English – Yoga and Buddhism in the life of a contemporary person.

Minařík died on 4 July 1974 in the hospital in Prague-Zbraslav.

== Books ==
His writings were organized into the following books:

=== Edition Direct Path ===
- The Direct Path
- The Inner Meaning of the New Testament
- The Path to Perfection
- The Light of Geniuses
- The Talk of Gods – principal work. Detailed information about binds of yoga and about "integral yoga" that can be practiced without danger.
- The Salvation
- Yoga in the Life of a Contemporary Person
- A Small Mystical Encyclopedia
- The Secret of Tibet 1 – Minařík commentary to The Seven Tibetan Texts by W.Y. Evans-Wentz
- The Secret of Tibet 2 – Minařík commentary to the Bardo Thödol - Tibetan Book of the Dead by W.Y. Evans-Wentz
- Mahayana Texts – The Voice of the Silence, The Two Paths, The Seven Portals – Old Buddhist texts by H. P. Blavatsky with comments by Minařík
- Milarepa – the story of life and spiritual development of a famous (distinguished) Tibetan saint from 11th century (W.Y. Evans-Wentz) with comments by Minařík and a study by tibetologist J. Kolmas.
- Kechara

=== Edition Gems ===
- The Secret Initiation
- Gems 1 and 2
- The Word of Buddha
- A Profound Insight
- Patanjali's Yoga-sutra
- Lao tzu's Tao-te-Ching

=== A short example of his writings ===
...We can feel happy or unhappy without an external reason, only by the power of our own will. The possibility of this is indirectly confirmed, for example by a well known fact that, when someone has some sorrow, they forget about it, if their attention is caught by something else. Based on this very piece of knowledge, a system can be created. By the power of our will, we can turn our attention away from the situations which brought us to suffering, and simply change the whole situation by focusing our attention on things that evoke good feelings in us... Excerpt from Why to develop joyful mood, Yoga and Buddhism in the life of a contemporary person

== See also ==
- Kagyupa
- Marpa Lotsawa
- Milarepa
- Naropa
- Jiří Vacek
- Karel Werner
- Tilopa
