= Ryan McCombs =

American singer (born 1974)

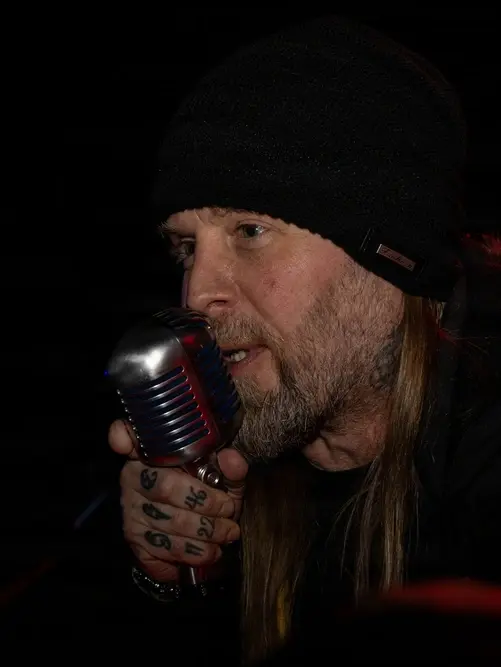
- McCombs performing with Drowning Pool in 2026

Background information
- Born: July 16, 1974 (age 52); Muncie, Indiana, U.S.
- Genres: Alternative metal; hard rock; post-grunge; nu metal
- Occupations: Singer, songwriter
- Years active: 1997–2004; 2005–present
- Member of: Soil; Drowning Pool
- Website: soiltheband.com

Ryan McCombs (born July 16, 1974) is an American musician best known as the vocalist of alternative metal bands Soil and Drowning Pool.

== Career ==
=== Soil (1997–2004, 2011–present) ===
McCombs was discovered by Soil through a compilation CD of unsigned bands. He joined the band as lead vocalist in mid-1997. Soil released three albums (Throttle Junkies, Scars and Redefine) and two EPs (Soil and El Chupacabra) during his time in the group. With heavy anthems like "Halo" and "Unreal", the band gained commercial recognition and international status with their second album, Scars, in 2001. Their 2004 follow-up would continue Soil's significant exposure. While touring for their latest album, McCombs suddenly decided to leave the band, which caused the cancelation of many scheduled performances alongside acts like Sevendust and Damageplan.

In 2011, McCombs rejoined Soil. The band played various venues throughout the UK including Download Festival at which it played a live acoustic set for the first time. The band released their new album Whole on August 16, 2013 (worldwide) and August 20, 2013 (North America).

=== Drowning Pool (2005–2011, 2023–present) ===
After his departure, McCombs took a one-year hiatus from the music business. By the time he returned to music, Soil had already found a new lead singer, A.J. Cavalier. Around this time, Drowning Pool's second singer, Jason Jones, left to join A.M. Conspiracy. Amidst rumors spreading about who would be Drowning Pool's next singer, the band confirmed the new vocalist's identity at Ozzfest in Dallas, Texas on August 25, 2005, to be McCombs.

The first Drowning Pool song released with McCombs as the singer was a remake of their song "Rise Up", originally performed with Jason Jones as lead singer. The song was titled "Rise Up 2006" and featured as a bonus downloadable track on WWE Wreckless Intent, and was the theme for WWE SmackDown until 2008. The soundtrack to the film Saw III contains a demo version of "No More", the second track released with McCombs on vocals. Drowning Pool recorded their third studio album, Full Circle, released on August 7, 2007. It featured the hit single "37 Stitches". "Shame", which was released as the album's last single, was featured in the Saw IV soundtrack.

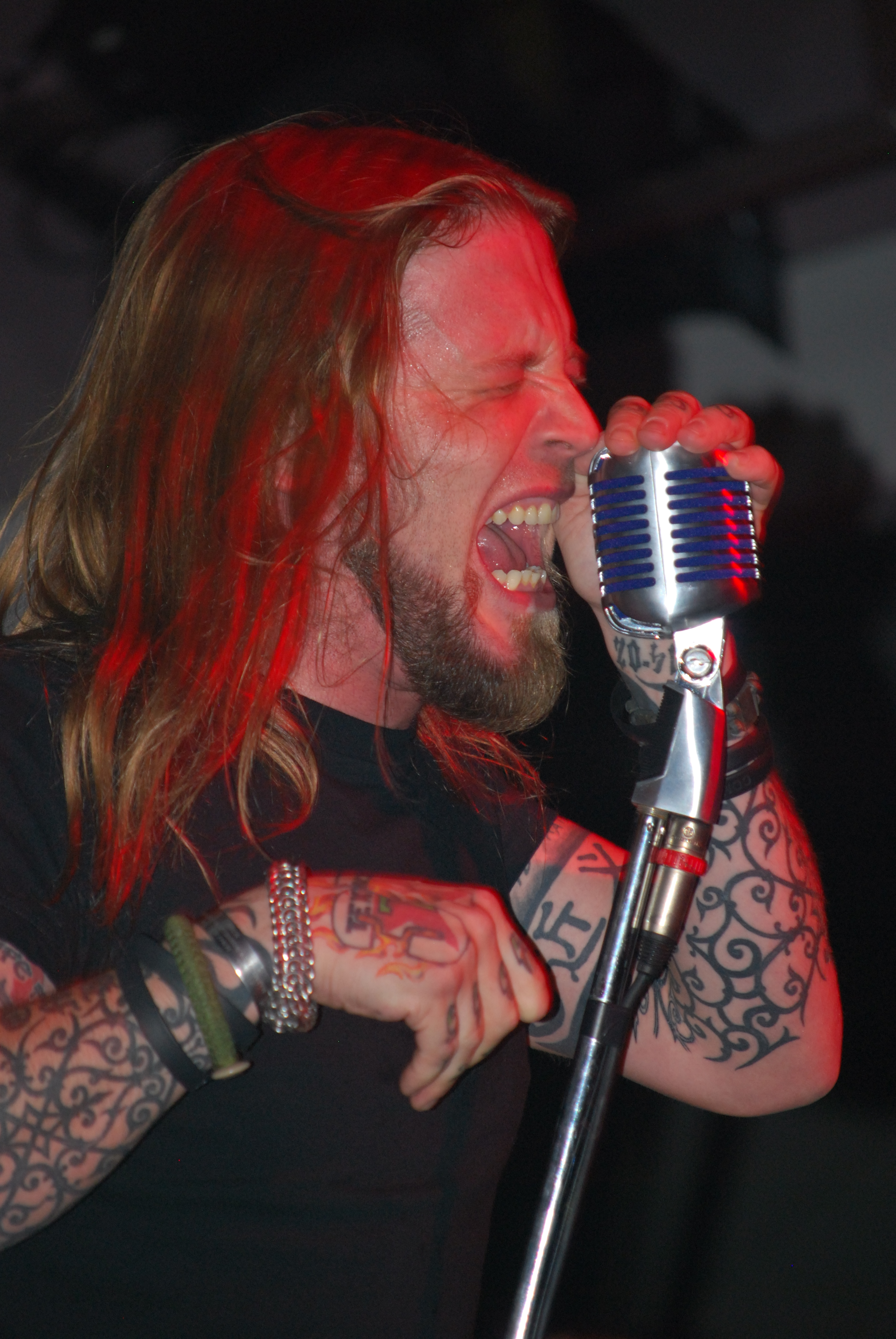
McCombs with Drowning Pool in 2010

In 2010, the band released their self-titled fourth album. It once again featured McCombs as lead vocalist, making it the first album the band recorded that did not feature a new singer.

In November 2011, it was announced that McCombs and Drowning Pool would be parting ways, and that he would once again front Soil.

On March 16, 2023, Drowning Pool announced that McCombs (while continuing his vocal duties with Soil) had rejoined, replacing the previous vocalist Jasen Moreno. This marks his return to the band, since leaving in 2011.

== Personal life ==
McCombs has three children. He married his second wife Chantale Coady in 2017.

McCombs suffered a stroke in 2014 a couple of days after playing at The Bierkeller in Bristol.

== Discography ==
=== Soil ===
- Soil (EP, 1997)
- El Chupacabra! (EP, 1998)
- Throttle Junkies (1999)
- Scars (2001)
- Redefine (2004)
- Whole (2013)
- Play It Forward (2022)
- Restoration (2023)

=== Drowning Pool ===
- Full Circle (2007)
- Loudest Common Denominator (live album, 2009)
- Drowning Pool (2010)
