= Soil (American band) =

American alternative metal band

SOiL
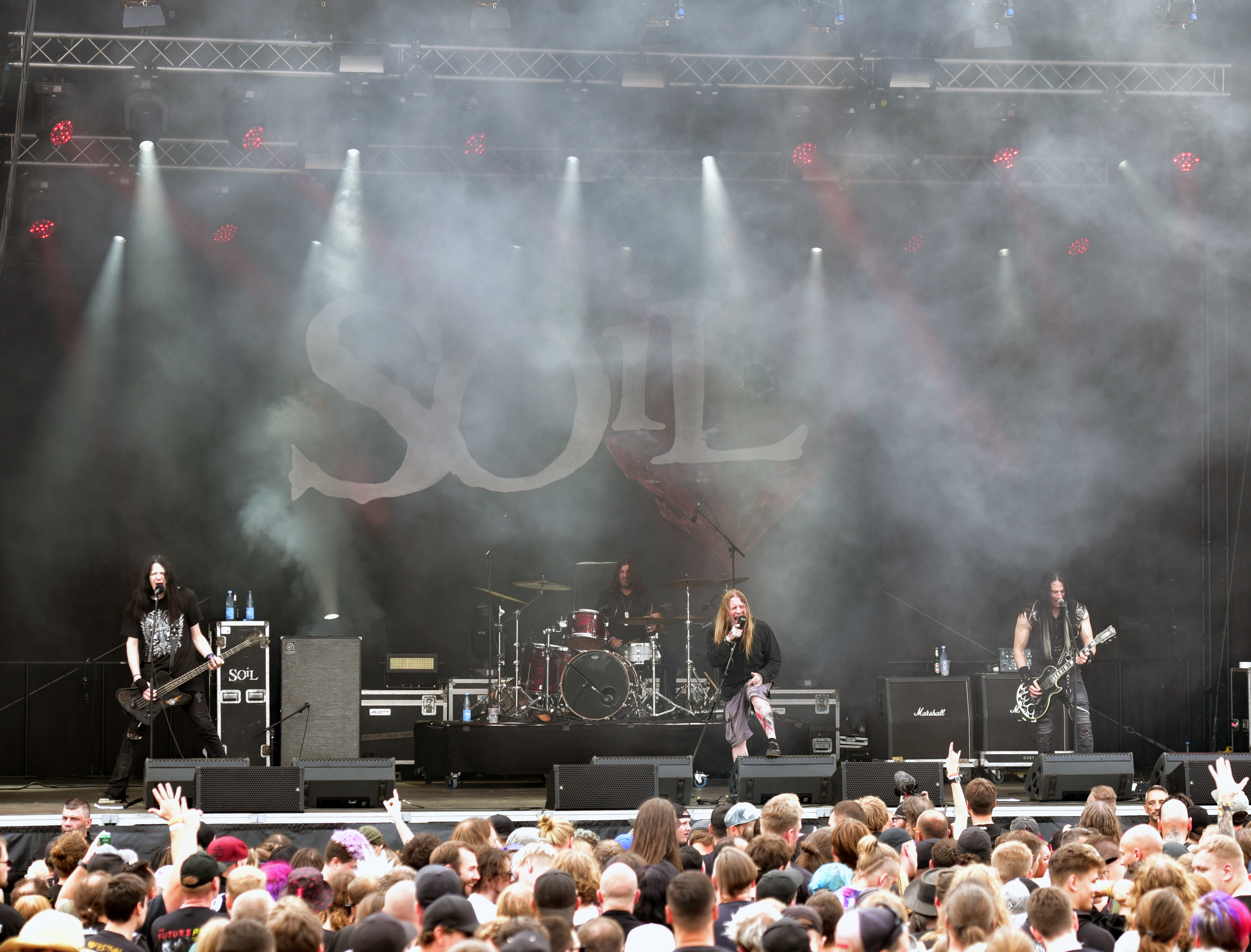
- SOiL performing in 2024

Background information
- Origin: Chicago, Illinois, U.S.
- Genres: Alternative metal; hard rock; nu metal
- Works: Soil discography
- Years active: 1997–present
- Labels: Olympic; M.I.A.; J; DRT; Bieler Bros.; AFM/Pavement
- Members: Ryan McCombs; Adam Zadel; Tim King; TJ Taylor
- Past members: Tom Schofield; Shaun Glass; A.J. Cavalier; Jordan Lee; Mike Tignino; Jon Wysocki; Mitch Gable
- Website: soiltheband.com

Soil (often stylized as SOiL) is an American alternative metal band that was formed in Chicago, Illinois, in 1997. After some independent releases, the band was the first rock group signed to J Records and achieved mainstream success with their major label debut, Scars, in 2001. The J Records second album, Redefine, was released in 2004 and the band embarked upon a worldwide tour to follow. In late 2004, frontman Ryan McCombs left the group. He would go on to become the new vocalist of Drowning Pool the following year.

The band recruited ex-Diesel Machine vocalist A.J. Cavalier as its new singer and released two more studio albums (True Self and Picture Perfect) through independent labels in 2006 and 2009 respectively. Soil continued to tour worldwide and achieved strong independent success. The band had brief line-up changes until fall 2011.

Soil reunited with Ryan McCombs on a tour commemorating the tenth anniversary of their landmark album, Scars. The line-up is currently completed with fellow original members Tim King (bass) and Adam Zadel (guitar), who are the only two members to have stayed with the band from its inception until present. The band released their sixth studio album, Whole, in 2013. They released a greatest hits album titled Scream: The Essentials in 2017. An album of covers, Play It Forward, was released in 2022. It was followed by Restoration in 2023, a studio album of re-recorded Soil songs.

== History ==
=== Beginnings and early releases (1997–2000) ===
Soil was originally formed in 1997 by three of four members of death metal act Oppressor, joined by guitarist of another death metal act Broken Hope – as a side project to their other bands. Ryan McCombs was later recruited for vocal duties.

The original line-up of the band was Ryan McCombs (vocals), Shaun Glass (Broken Hope), Tom Schofield, Tim King, and Adam Zadel (all three ex-Oppressor). The band got its name from the Entombed song "Rotten Soil" by opting to simply drop the "Rotten" part and stick with "Soil".

Soil released two independent EPs, Soil (on Olympic Records) and El Chupacabra ( on M.I.A.). In 1999, Soil released their debut album Throttle Junkies, however, M.I.A closed down two months after its release. It was around this time that all the members of Soil left their other bands to focus on Soil as their main project.

=== Rise to popularity and McCombs' departure (2001–2005) ===
With the song "Halo" gaining major radio attention, labels began a bidding war for a deal with Soil. The band would ultimately be signed to J Records by music industry legend Clive Davis, responsible for signing such acts as Pink Floyd and Bruce Springsteen, who stated that "you're gonna be my only rock band for now. You're going to be a priority, and I want to break this band." Soil finally experienced mainstream success with the major label debut, Scars, released September 11, 2001. This achievement was aided by the popular singles "Halo" and "Unreal" which gained the band exposure on MTV. The success resulted in the band winning Metal Edge magazine's 2001 Readers' Choice Award for "Next Big Thing".

Soil worked on their third album all throughout 2003. In 2004, the band released their second major label album, Redefine. The group toured for a year in support of the album and returned home to begin writing follow up material and finish various live dates. Shortly after, vocalist Ryan McCombs announced his departure from the group to be with his family, forcing the band to cancel scheduled shows. New York–based vocalist A.J. Cavalier, previously of World In Pain and Diesel Machine, was introduced on November 15, 2004, as McCombs' replacement. On July 20, 2005, McCombs was confirmed to be the new singer for Drowning Pool.

=== Cavalier era (2005–2010) ===
On September 21, 2005, Soil signed with New York–based independent label DRT Entertainment. Their album True Self was released on May 2, 2006. The album leaked onto P2P and BitTorrent sites on March 4, almost two months before its official release. Soil embarked upon a very heavy worldwide touring schedule to promote the release. In November 2007, Shaun Glass parted ways with the band, citing personal and musical differences.

On October 20, 2009, the album Picture Perfect was released via Bieler Bros Records worldwide, except in Europe, where it was released by AFM Records. Picture Perfect was produced by Johnny K (Disturbed, Staind), Ulrich Wild (Deftones, Incubus) and Soil, with Dave Fortman (Mudvayne, Evanescence) handling mixing duties. It was promoted with the lead single "Like It Is". In January 2010, "The Lesser Man" was announced as a second single.

On July 23, 2010, vocalist A.J. Cavalier, and drummer Tom Schofield announced their departure from the band. Vocalist Jordan Lee and drummer Mike Tignino were announced as fill-ins for scheduled live dates.

=== McCombs' return (2011–present) ===
The band reunited with original vocalist Ryan McCombs for a 12-date co-headlining UK tour with Puddle of Mudd in October 2011 to celebrate the 10th anniversary of Scars.

Soil added several US tour dates throughout 2012. The trek was the band's first in the US since original frontman Ryan McCombs - at this point also the singer of Drowning Pool - rejoined the group.

Soil's first ever DVD, Re-LIVE-ing the Scars, was released May 8, 2012. The DVD/CD combo was recorded live in London during the band's 2011 UK tour and features the first live show with vocalist Ryan McCombs in seven years.

Soil's sixth studio album, Whole, was released on August 16, 2013 (worldwide) and August 20, 2013 (North America). The album was funded through Kickstarter. The band released a music video and single for "Shine On" on June 25, 2013.

The band released the compilation album Scream: The Essentials on September 15, 2017, via Pavement/AFM Records. It features the band's hits along with alternate versions and unreleased material, and includes a cover of "Gimme Some Lovin'" by The Spencer Davis Group.

In 2021, Soil worked on new material for the follow-up to Whole. In July 2022, the band announced they would be releasing their new album, Play It Forward, on August 26. The album consists of cover songs that inspired the band members throughout the years. On June 28, 2023, the band announced their new album Restoration. The album features re-recordings of various Soil songs. It was released later that same year.

In February 2026, the band was confirmed to be on the roster for the Louder Than Life festival taking place in Louisville in September.

On July 1, 2026, former guitarist and founding member Shaun Glass died at the age of 57. He had suffered a stroke one month earlier. Glass became the second member of the band to have suffered a stroke, after Ryan McCombs in 2014, who made a full recovery and continued his music career.

== Band members ==
Current

- Ryan McCombs – lead vocals (1997–2004, 2011–present)
- Adam Zadel – lead guitar, backing vocals (1997–present)
- Tim King – bass, backing vocals (1997–present)
- T.J. Taylor – drums (2017–present)

Former

- Shaun Glass – rhythm guitar (1997–2007; died 2026)
- Tom Schofield – drums (1997–2010)
- A.J. Cavalier – lead vocals (2004–2010)
- Jordan Lee – lead vocals (2010–2011)
- Mike Tignino – drums (2010–2011)
- Jon Wysocki – drums (2011–2012; died 2024)
- Mitch Gable – drums (2012–2017)

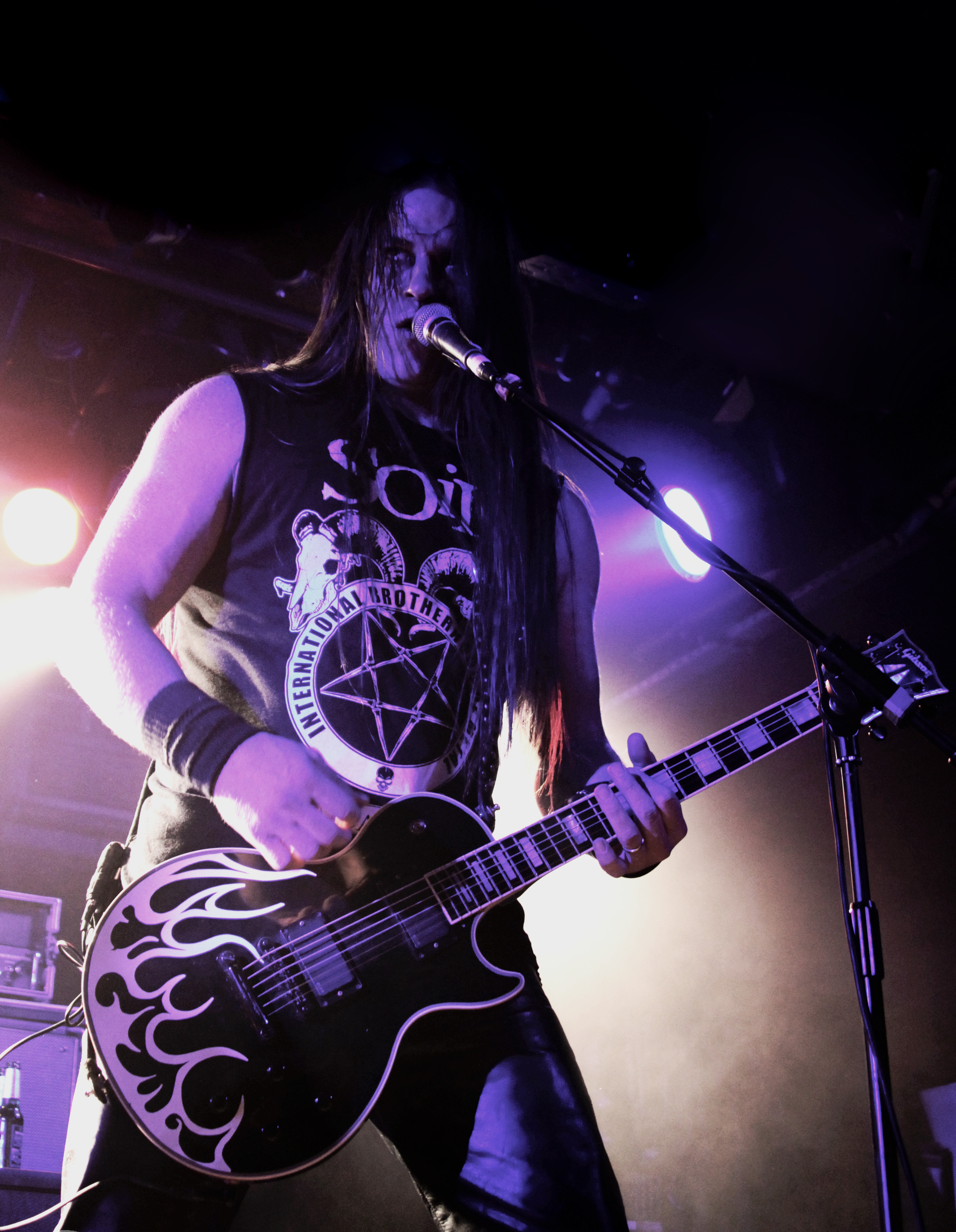
Adam Zadel

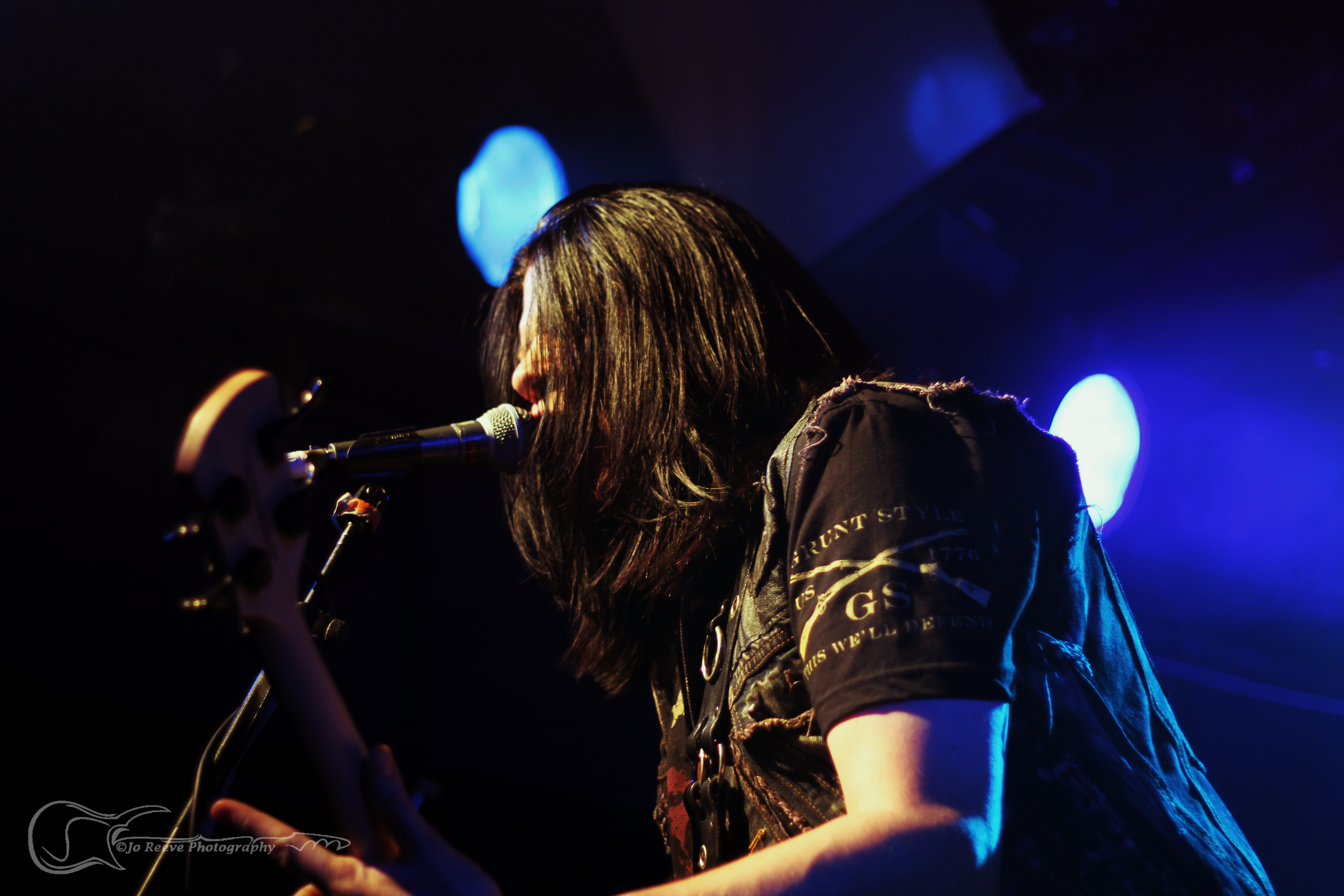
Tim King

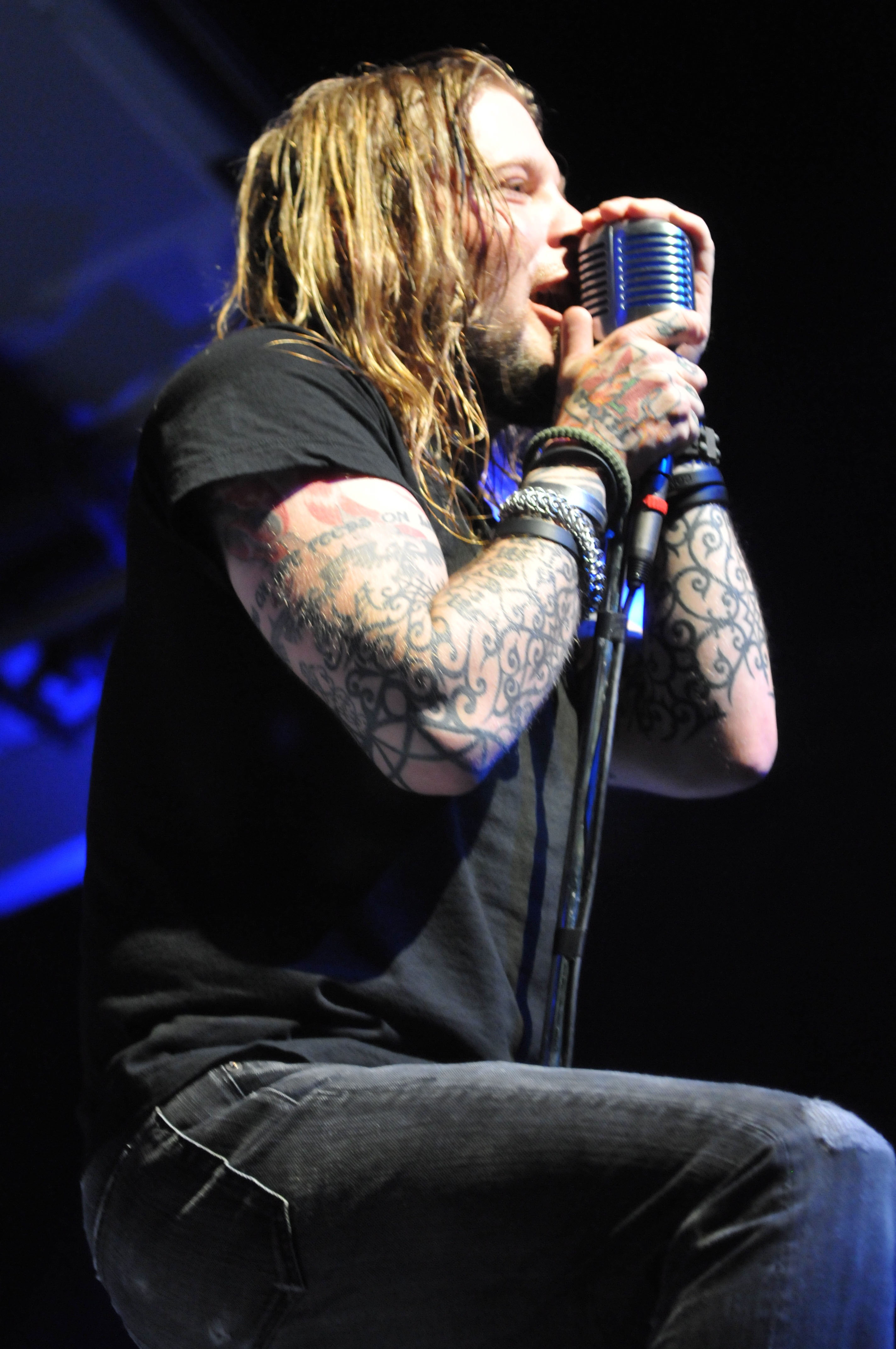
Ryan McCombs

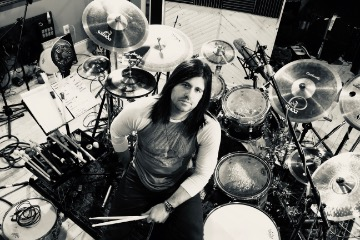
T.J. Taylor

== Discography ==
Studio albums

- Throttle Junkies (1999)
- Scars (2001)
- Redefine (2004)
- True Self (2006)
- Picture Perfect (2009)
- Whole (2013)
- Play It Forward (2022)
- Restoration (2023)
- TBA (2027)

== Awards and nominations ==
Metal Edge Readers' Choice Awards

Year	Nominee / work	Award	Result
2001	SOiL	Next Big Thing	Won
