= Oppressor =

American technical death metal band

- Origin: Chicago, Illinois, U.S.
- Genre: Death metal
- Years active: 1991–1999
- Labels: Red Light, Olympic (Century Media)
- Spinoffs: Soil
- Past members: Tim King; Tom Schofield; Jim Stopper; Adam Zadel

Oppressor is a death metal band from Chicago, Illinois, formed in 1991 and disbanded in 1999. They released three albums, Elements of Corrosion, Agony, and Solstice of Oppression". Three of the band's members went on to form alternative metal band Soil.

== History ==
Tim King and Adam Zadel formed Oppressor in May 1991. A month later, they found guitarist Jim Stopper and drummer Tom Schofield. They recorded their first demo, World Abomination, in 1991. A second demo, As Blood Flows, recorded in 1993, secured them a deal with Red Light Records, who released their first full-length album, Solstice of Oppression, in 1994. Shortly after the album's release, Red Light went bankrupt. Before finding another label, the band released a one-off live album/compilation album with Megalithic Records, entitled Oppression Live/As Blood Flows. Megalithic, a Milwaukee, WI label, also went bankrupt after a few months of activity. They signed with Olympic Recordings and released Agony in 1996.

In 1997, three-quarters of the band, bar Jim Stopper, started an alternative metal side project called Soil, with Broken Hope guitarist Shaun Glass and Ryan McCombs. In 1998, Oppressor released their final album, Elements of Corrosion. When Soil become more popular than Oppressor in 1999, the band split. In 2021, vocalist Tim King announced his return to death metal with the band Embryonic Autopsy. The Embryonic Autopsy debut album, Prophecies of the Conjoined, was released by Massacre Records in February 2022.

== Musical style ==
Oppressor played technical death metal. They were influenced by Morbid Angel, Death, Gorguts, and Suffocation. Their lyrics centred on death, suffering, and moral depravity. They were one of the first death metal bands to incorporate keyboards.

== Members ==
=== Former ===
- Tim King - lead vocals, bass, keyboards (1991-1999)
- Adam Zadel - guitar (1991-1999)
- Jim Stopper - guitar (1991-1999)
- Tom Schofield - drums (1991-1999)

== Discography ==
=== Demos ===
- World Abomination (1991)
- As Blood Flows (1992)

=== EPs ===
- Oppressor (1994, Funeral Mask)

=== Studio albums ===
- Solstice of Oppression (1994, Red Light)
- Agony (1996, Olympic)
- Elements of Corrosion (1998, Olympic)

=== Compilation albums ===
- Oppression Live/As Blood Flows (1995, Megalithic)
- The Solstice of Agony and Corrosion (2009, Mortal Music)
