= Tim King =

American educator

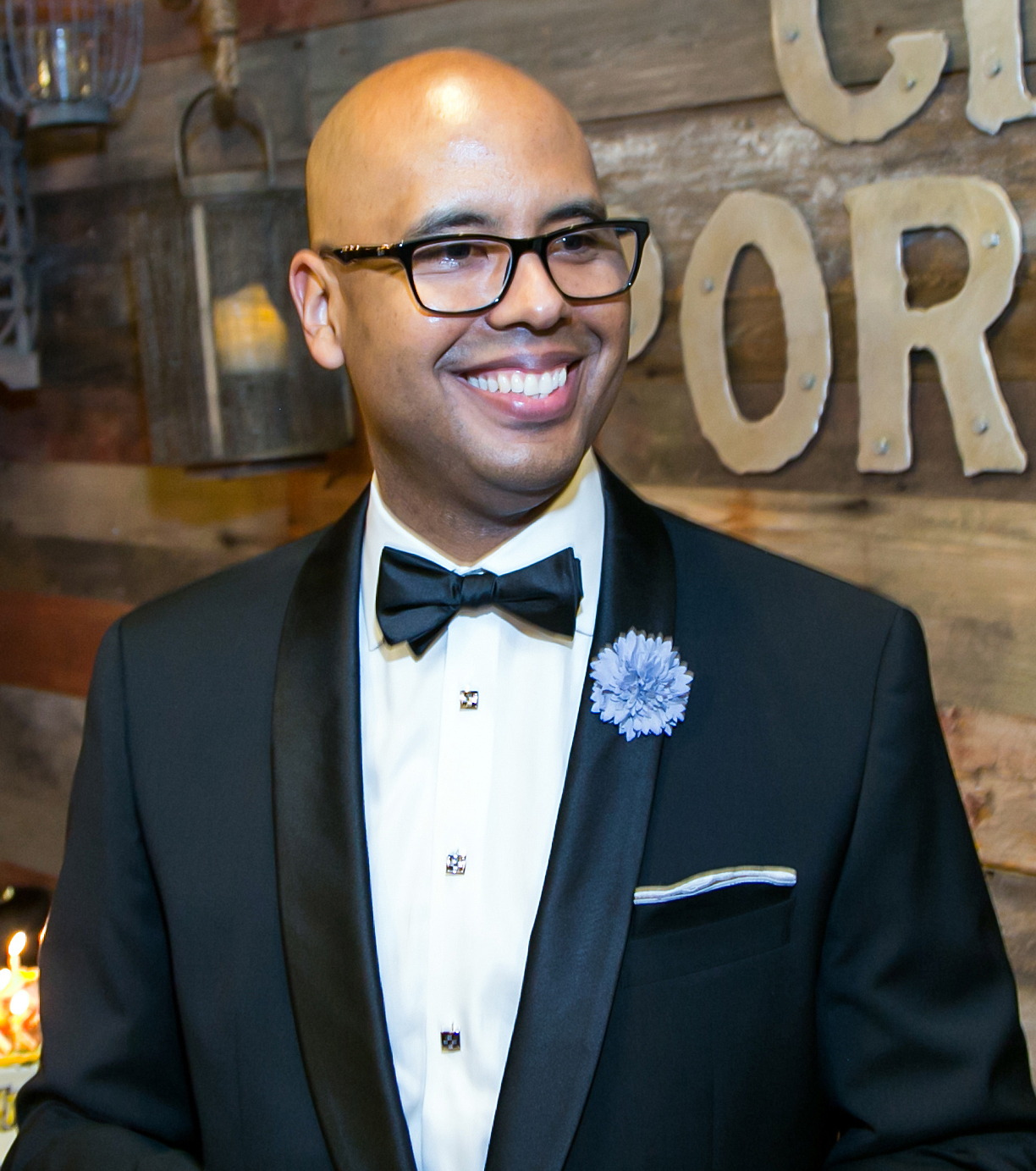
- King in 2013
- Born: June 15, 1967 (age 57); Chicago, Illinois, U.S.
- Education: Degrees in Foreign Service and Law from Georgetown University
- Occupations: Educator; Lecturer; Non-Profit Leader

Tim King (born June 15, 1967) is an American educator, non-profit leader, and the founder and CEO of Urban Prep Academies, a network of all-male charter public high schools in Chicago. King and Urban Prep have received international attention for the fact that since the school's first graduating class in 2010, 100% of its graduates have been accepted into a four-year college or university.

== Personal life ==
King was born in Chicago, attended St. Ignatius College Prep and completed his bachelors and Juris Doctor degrees at Georgetown University. While at the Georgetown University Law Center, King became involved working as a teacher at a nearby Catholic high school, and eventually he determined to pursue teaching as a full-time career. King is a member of Alpha Phi Alpha fraternity. In 2010, he was named one of People Magazine′s Heroes of the Year. He holds doctoral degrees honoris causa from Adler University and Dominican University.

== Professional career ==
After completing law school, King was named President of Hales Franciscan High School in Chicago, an all-male, predominately African-American school on the city's South Side. While at Hales, King appeared on The Oprah Winfrey Show, an interview in which Oprah characterized him as an "Angel". During King's five-year tenure as President of Hales, 100 percent of the school's graduates were admitted to college.

Two years after departing Hales, King founded a network of all-male public high schools, Urban Prep Academies, in order to address Chicago’s woefully low rate of college graduation for black males. Under King's leadership, Urban Prep Academies received charters from the Chicago Board of Education to open three high schools in neighborhoods throughout the city. For his work with Urban Prep Academies, King is recognized as a national leader on education reform. In addition to his management of Urban Prep, King has taught courses on the subjects of urban education and philanthropy at Northwestern University, written for the Chicago Tribune, Chicago Sun-Times, The Chronicle of Higher Education, Crain's Chicago Business, Huffington Post, and The New York Times and lectured to groups across the United States. On February 5, 2014, King was appointed to the Board of Commissioners of the Chicago Park District; in 2018 he was appointed to the Georgetown University Board of Regents; in 2020, he was elected to the Georgetown University Board of Governors; and in 2021, King joined the Advisory Board of WorkBox.

== Awards and media ==
King has been recognized by Black Entertainment Television, Ebony Magazine, Jet Magazine, Crain's Chicago Business, and The Grio for his leadership within the African-American and Chicago communities. In 2006, he was named one of Crain’s "Forty under Forty." In February 2009, he was named one of the top 100 African-American "History Makers in the Making" by The Grio. In March 2010, King was named ABC World News Tonight's "Person of the Week" along with the students of Urban Prep Academies. The honor was given to coincide with the school's announcement that 100% of the first graduating class had been accepted to a 4-year college or university. Later that year, he was further honored with the American Association of Blacks in Higher Education’s “Pacesetter’s Award” and the “Phoenix Award for Education” from Alpha Phi Alpha fraternity. In connection with Urban Prep, he has also been named a “Man of the Year” by Men’s Journal, and has been a finalist in GQ Magazine’s “Better Men Better World” search as well as Chicago Magazine’s “Chicagoan of the Year.” In 2014, King was invited to attend the 2014 BET Awards to receive The Shine A Light Award for his work with Urban Prep Academies. In 2012, King appeared on The Moth to tell the true story of welcoming one of his students into his home. On January 19, 2019, King was honored at the 27th Annual Bounce Trumpet Awards held in Atlanta with the Education Excellence Award.
