= Dimitris Basis =

Dimitris Basis Δημήτρης Μπάσης
- Born: Dimitrios Bibasis; Greek: Δημήτριος Μπιμπάσης; Stuttgart, Germany
- Genre: Laïko
- Occupation: Musician
- Instrument: vocals
- Years active: 1990–present

Dimitrios Bibasis (Δημήτριος Μπιμπάσης), better known by his stage name Dimitris Basis (Δημήτρης Μπάσης), is a Greek singer and musician. He is from the village of Cherso, near the city of Kilkis in Central Macedonia.

== Biography ==
Dimitris Basis was born in Stuttgart. His parents lived in Germany for some years. He came to Greece for the first time at the age of eight when his entire family returned to Cherso, a small village south of the border with the Socialist Republic of North Macedonia.

At the age of nine, he started chanting the liturgy in the local church and three years later he began to study Byzantine music. He gained his diploma at the age of seventeen. At the same time he used to sing at many cultural celebrations.

When he was twenty years old just after his first steps in professional singing he was discovered by Stamatis Kraounakis and Warner Music company, who immediately offered him a contract. For three continuous seasons he was singing with Alkistis Protopsalti, Stamatis Kraounakis and Lina Nikolakopoulou, and met success due to his musical performances under the music director Andreas Voutsinas. His professional debut began with his participation in two of Stamatis Kraounakis works: “Otan Erhonde I Fili mou” where he sang two songs and in the soundtrack of the T.V. series “To Trito Stefani” where he took part in one song.

In 1996 he collaborated with Christos Nikolopoulos and he performed live. In 1997 his first album became a reality with the title “Me tin Fora tou Anemou” (music by Christos Nikolopoulos, Kostas Falkonis and lyrics by Christos Papadopoulos). Eight months later the soundtrack of T.V. series “Psithiri Kardias” was in music stores (music by Christos Nikolopoulos and lyrics by Eleni Giannatsoulia). It was a tremendous success with over 120,000 sales. Dimitris Basis’ voice started to be heard not only in Greece but abroad as well. In the next season he worked with Dimitra Galani and Manolis Lidakis and by the end of 1998 his second personal album “Se Anihtous Ouranous” is ready (music by Christos Nikolopoulos and lyrics by Aris Davarakis, Eleni Giannatsoulia).

The winter period of 1998–99 was important to Dimitris Mpasis’ career because of his collaboration with Haris Alexiou. In the summer of 1999 he started a series of concerts all over Greece and Cyprus with Giannis Kotsiras. That same summer he performed with Stavros Xarhakos in a series of concerts with K.O.E.M. (National Orchestra of Greek Music) both in Greece and abroad. Simultaneously he took part in a dedicated concert for Christos Nikolopoulos in the Athens Concert Hall. This concert was also performed again in the Herodes Atticus Odeon. In October 1999 he gave a series of concerts in Australia with Irini Haridou. In the winter of 1999 and 2000, we saw him with Eleni Tsaligopoulou.

In 2000, his personal album “Milao Hronia” was in the stores (music by Vaso Alagianni and lyrics by Nikos Moraitis). The year 2001 was a decisive year in his career because he met the great Greek composer Mikis Theodorakis who proposed to revise and perform together one of his most important works: “To Tragoudi tou Nekrou Adelfou”. This particular work had been sung for first time in 1961 by Grigoris Bithikotsis but was never completed as due to the political situation at that time some songs had been censored. For this work the great composer decided -after 17 years of absence from studios- to get back to work and lead “The Popular Orchestra Mikis Theodorakis”. Some months later a new Dimitris Basis’ album followed. Its title was “I Agapi Ine Fotia” and its songs were mostly remakes of Mikis Theodorakis love songs.

In December 2001 he started his appearances together with Yannis Kotsiras in Athens and their success continued until March 2002 in Thessaloniki. This success presented them with the title of the most commercial music duet of the summer.

Next winter found Dimitris Basis in an “alliance” with Pashalis Terzis and Dimitris Mitropanos. This music shape was created at the same time as the announcement by the music company MINOS – EMI that a new album with the name “Dimitris Basis” was being released (2003). It was an artistic work from various creators, including popular songs such as "I Zoi" and "Ki Efyga". From the first date of its release it gained the acceptance of public and critics who admired Basis’ music personality one more time.

In the summer of 2003, he took part in a dedication to the poet Yiannis Ritsos –throughout Greece- with the “Mikis Theodorakis” Orchestra. The poems (“Epitaphios, Romiosini, Ta Dekaohto Lianotragouda tis Pikris Patridas, I Piites tou Kosmou) were composed by Mikis Theodorakis. In December 2003 he started a very successful collaboration with Manolis Lidakis in Thessaloniki which continued with additional appearances in Athens and in summer concerts all over Greece.

At the same time he was working on his new CD with the title “Diskoli Kardia” (music by Nikos Antipas and lyrics by Lina Nikolakopoulou, Mirto Kontova) which was released in December 2004. In the summer of 2004 he gave some personal concerts with songs from his entire repertoire. He also sang alongside Maria Farantouri, songs of the great Mikis Theodorakis.

In the winter of 2004–2005, he started his appearances with Dimitris Mitropanos and Themis Adamantidis in Athens and Thessaloniki. Their work was a hymn to "Zeimbekiko" dance (in Greek culture, a man's dance). The cd of their live appearances in "Akti Pireos" released in April with the title "Iparhi ke to Zeimbekiko".

In May 2005, he took part in the celebrations in honour of the eightieth birthday of the famous composer Mikis Theodorakis. The titles of the songs which he sang were "The Songs of Passion and Love". These celebrations took place during the "Greek Festival" in Herod Atticus Odeon.

In the same year's summer he departed for first time on a successful solo tour at selected cities around Greece.

== Discography ==
=== Personal Discography ===
- Me ti fora tou anemou (1996)
- Psithyroi Kardias (1997) by Christos Nikolopoulos
- Se anoihtous ouranous (1998)
- Milao hronia (2000)
- Spasmeno karavi (2001) [cd single]
- To tragoudi tou nekrou aderfou (2001) by Mikis Theodorakis
- I agapi einai fotia (2001) by Mikis Theodorakis
- Dimitris Basis (2003)
- Dyskoli Kardia (2004)
- I Zoi Allou Se Paei (2007)
- Apo to Vyzantio sto Simera (2008)
- Dimitris Mpasis - Live (2010)
- I Synnefia Pernaei me Parea (2011) by Lavrentis Machairitsas
- Ti Ta Theleis (2017)

=== Collaborations ===
- Otan Erhontai Oi Filoi Mou
- To Trito Stefani OST (1996)
- Odeon Herodes Atticus - Christos Nikolopoulos
- Helidonia tis Vrochis - Giorgos Andreou
- Savvorama - Dionysis Savvopoulos
- Gia ton Grigori
- Fos (2004)
- Yparhei kai to Zeimpekiko (Dimitris Mitropanos - Themis Adamantidis - Dimitris Basis)
- To Kafe tou Erota - Charis Romas
- Spaei to Rodi - Leuteris Papadopoulos
- Tis Zois Mou Ta Tragoudia - Christos Nikolopoulos
