= Giorgos Karadimos =

- Born: Peristeri, Athens, Greece
- Origin: Greece
- Occupations: Singer, composer, lyricist, stage actor
- Instruments: Vocals, guitar
- Years active: 1994–present

Giorgos Karadimos is a musician from Greece. A composer and lyricist, he was nominated for the Eurovision Song Contest in 2010. In 2026 he collaborated with pop legend Marc Almond dueting at his song titled “Just Cry”.

== Biography ==
Karadimos was born in Peristeri in Athens, Greece on 7 October 1975. He studied journalism. He is self-taught on guitar. He is also a music composer and lyricist; he has written for Eleftheria Arvanitaki's album "Kai ta matia ki he kardia", the song "toso megala logia" and Melina Aslanidou's latest hit "alle mia fora".

His career started on 1994, participating in a musical by Sofia Spyratos and her team "Roes".

In 2001 he joined Stamatis Kraounakis's theatrical team "Speira Speira" which at the time was in a show called "Sold Out". The same year Giorgos Karadimos started his collaboration with Alkistis Protopsalti on her summer tour, a collaboration that continued for several years (until her most recent appearances in music hall "Vox" with Dimitra Galani). Many important Greek singers have collaborated with Giorgos Karadimos, including Dimitris Mitropanos, Dimitra Galani, Manos Purobolakis, Melina Aslanidou, and Eleonora Zouganeli.

In 2003 he released his first CD album "mesa ap to tzami" orchestrated by Giorgos Zachariou. In March 2007 his album "Fos kai bgaino" was released by Universal Music. It includes the hit single duet with Dimitra Galani titled "Se Thelo Edo" (a Greek version of Andrea Bocelli's song "Vivo per lei") as well as the new singles "Me pmigei touth e siopi" and "sa na nai psema. The music was produced and arranged by Soumka & C. Avdelas, mastering was done at Sterling sound studios N.Y by Leo Zervos, and Giorgos Kyvelos was the producer of the album.

In 2010 he was one of the Greek nominees for the 55th Eurovision Song Contest with a ballad called "Polemao".

In April 2010 was released his third CD album "Kalyteres Meres" by Universal Music that includes the hit singles "Kalyteres Meres", "S'ena kosmo ilektriko" (a Greek version of Calogero's song "Pomme C") and "Polemao". In the same year was his summer tour around Greece with Thanasis Aleyras.

In winter 2010–11, he was part of the Jonathan Larson's musical "Rent" playing the main character, Roger Davis.
