= Manolis Mitsias =

Greek singer (born 1946)

Manolis Mitsias Μανώλης Μητσιάς
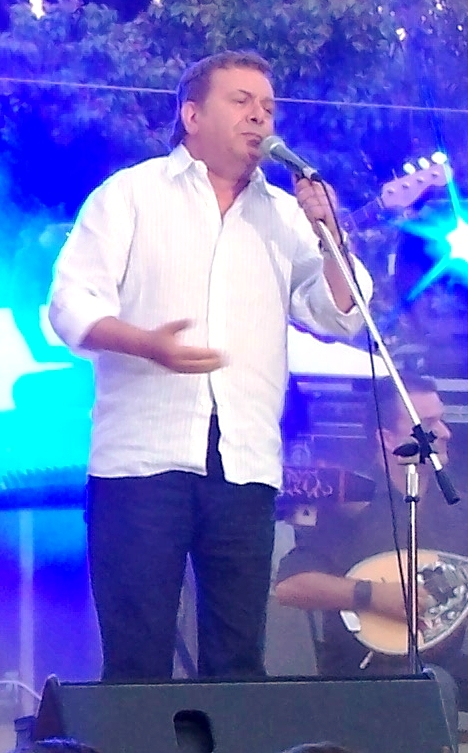

Background information
- Born: 26 February 1946 (age 79); Doumpia, Polygyros, Greece
- Origin: Thessaloniki, Greece
- Occupation: Singer
- Years active: 1969–present
- Musical career
- Genres: Entekhno, Laïko
- Instrument: Vocals

Manolis Mitsias (Greek: Μανώλης Μητσιάς, pronounced [ma.ˈno.lis mi.ˈt͡sças]; born 26 February 1946) is a Greek singer. He has been a significant artistic presence in the laïko, light laïko and entekhno genres of modern Greek music.

== Early life ==
Mitsias was born in the village of Doumpia, close to the town of Polygyros. From an early age, he was interested in Byzantine and folk music and was a cantor for a time period. Later, studying in Thessaloniki, he joined the 'Arts and Letters Club of Northern Greece' while at the same time founded a nightclub (boîte) where he began his career as a solo singer.

His first record came in 1969, with the song 'Στην Ελευσίνα μια φορά' ('In Elefsina Once'), written by Dimos Moutsis.

== Collaborations ==
In his five and a half decade career, Mitsias has worked with almost all of Greece (and Cyprus's) most well-known contemporary composers, such as the aforementioned Dimos Moutsis, Mikis Theodorakis, Loukianos Kilaidonis, Manos Hatzidakis, Stavros Xarchakos, Vassilis Tsitsanis, Marios Tokas, Giorgos Hatzinasios, Thanos Mikroutsikos, Yannis Markopoulos, Giannis Spanos and Stamatis Kraounakis, to name but a few. He has sung lyrics by many Greek poets and lyricists and even Spanish writer Federico García Lorca.

In terms of fellow singers, he has worked with Maria Farantouri, Dimitra Galani, Vicky Moscholiou, Babis Stokas, Sotiria Bellou and others.

He has appeared in concert around Greece and Cyprus and for Greek audiences abroad (London, New York and other cities). During the summer of 2009, he celebrated forty years of his career.
