= Maria Katinari =

Greek actress, singer, and lyricist

Maria Katinari (Greek: Μαρία Κατινάρη) is a Greek actress, singer, and lyricist. She was born in Chania on Crete as the oldest daughter of Antonios Katinaris.

== Early years ==
Due to her father being a well-known, very successful composer and a highly gifted Bouzouki-soloist and her mother Maria Rippi being a singer from a musical family, Katinari got early-stage experience.

In a short phase of her juvenile rebellion against the rembetiko tradition of the family, she joined a rock music group at the age of 13. Three years later, she began to travel during school-holidays as a singer through Europe.

She performed live at clubs in the Netherlands, England and Germany. In Paris she studied kinesiology and dance, whereby she financed her studies and living costs with her music.

Back in Athens, she took acting classes, studied classical and jazz dance. After some success as an actress on Athens' stages, her restless soul drove her to Cairo, where she studied classical and traditional Arab music and succeeded also interpreting Arab music.

== Musical work ==
Maria Katinari is particularly well known in Greece for her live concerts and television appearances. Their discography is limited so far to three personal albums. Beyond them she took part in successful music productions.

In 2006, she announced a new album with recompilations of Antonios Katinaris' well-known songs.

She has worked on Greek Live music stages with well-known Greek artists like Stratos Dionysiou, George Zambetas, Dimitris Mitropanos, Giannis Parios, Panos Gavalas, Poly Panou, Kaiti Grey, Rita Sakellariou, Anna Vissi, Babis Goles, Georgios Ksintaris, Babis Tsertos, Antonis Repanis and others. With the musical direction of Vasilis Dimitriou and the National Orchestra of Greek Music by Stavros Xarhakos, she also took a successful concert journey through Greece. She worked on several extremely successful music productions well-known Greek artists with hits.

Her success CD appeared in the label M.B.I. "If I a were a man" ("Αν ήμουν άντρας") deals with the deliberated women of the time between world wars in music apart. The increasing influence of the women on the society, in combination with the influence of Asia Minor's refugees is told with a contemporary Rembetiko music journey.
