= Kaiti Grey =

Greek singer and actress (1924–2025)

Kaiti Grey Καίτη Γκρέυ
- Born: Athanasia Gizili; 14 May 1924; Mytilinioi, Samos, Greece
- Died: 19 January 2025 (aged 100) Nea Smyrni, Athens, Greece
- Genre: laiko
- Occupation: Singer
- Instrument: Voice
- Years active: 1952–1996
- Label: Minos EMI
- Spouses: Nikos Iliadis; Michalis Papanastasopoulos

Athanasia Gizili (Greek: Αθανασία Γκιζίλη; 14 May 1924 – 19 January 2025), better known professionally as Kaiti Grey, was a Greek singer.

== Early life and career ==
Grey was born in the village of Mytilini in Samos and had three siblings. She was adopted by the Kalaitzis family and grew up in Piraeus. Initially, she became an actress in Rita Tsakona's bands and later sang songs with Giannis Vellas as well as other artists of the genre. Her role model was Tzimis Makoulis. Her first song, To Marazi, was recorded in 1952 and was the creation of Giorgos Mitsakis. After the success she achieved, she managed to become the first name in the biggest centers of the time and also to sing with all the great composers of her time.

Grey performed the first performances of songs by composers such as: Markos Vamvakaris, Vassilis Tsitsanis, Yiannis Papaioannou, George Mitsakis, Christos Kolokotronis, Eftychia Papagiannopoulou, Kostas Virvos, Theodoros Derveniotis, Babis Bakalis, George Zambetas and Panos Tzavellas. She collaborated with well-known artists such as: Roza Eskenazi, Stratos Pagioumtzis, Stelios Kazantzidis, Grigoris Bithikotsis, Poly Panou, Mary Linda, Giota Lydia, Antonis Repanis, Stratos Dionysiou, Rita Sakellariou, Spyros Zagoraios, Panos Gavalas, George Dalaras, Eleni Vitali, Charis Alexiou, Alkistis Protopsalti, Dimitra Galani, Antonis Vardis, Stefanos Korkolis, Christos Dantis.

In the 1960s she was the highest paid singer with a daily salary that even exceeded 8,000 drachmas. This was also recognized by the Greek Courts in a legal battle that existed with a nightclub owner at the time. She recorded more than 1,500 songs, until 1996, when she retired from recording and nightclubs. In 1995, Kostas Ferris signed a contract with ANT1 to bring her legendary life to the small screen. However, this was not to be fully achieved as the budget cost did not reach the 26 episodes the contract had been signed for. Filming took place in Greece, Turkey and Egypt, while the title song I defeated life performed by Yiannis Parios was never released on the discography. In 2006, her autobiography was published, As I experienced them. She acted in 19 films as an actress and singer.

== Personal life and death ==
Grey was engaged for five years to Stelios Kazantzidis, and then to Andreas Barkoulis. She was married twice, first to Nikos Iliadis with whom she had two sons, one of whom died in 2021, and to Michalis Papanastasopoulos. She was the grandmother of Greek singer Aggeliki Iliadi. She lived permanently in Nea Smyrni and in recent years she had been suffering from serious health problems.

Grey was hospitalised in February 2024 in critical condition, with atrial fibrillation and a respiratory tract infection, but she returned home in March, where she celebrated her 100th birthday on 14 May 2024. In October 2024, she suffered a stroke and was hospitalized, again, in critical condition but she returned to her home where she died on 19 January 2025, at the age of 100.

== Discography ==
- The malaise
- The mountain
- I got the army and I'm coming
- In life the paths
- Open Open
- Good mom i can't
- I'm going to cry today
- Magic your two eyes
- Angel Loved
- Never make mother bitter
- I want it to be Sunday
- Foreign Hands
- You said it and you did it
- Lit the cigarette
- Only a woman knows
- Deep into the sea I will fall

=== Singles ===
==== 1950s ====
Title	Year	Album
Ta dyo sou matia	1956	Agapi pou skotonei
Tsigana mou	1956	Agapi pou skotonei
Fellaches Agapes	1956	Agapi pou skotonei
Pistepsa stous orkous sou	1956	Agapi pou skotonei
Agapi pou skotonei	1956	Agapi pou skotonei
Thelo na einai Kyriaki	1956	Agapi pou skotonei
Dyo tsiganika matakia	1956	Agapi pou skotonei
I Tamara	1956	Agapi pou skotonei
Ktypa me katastitha	1956	Agapi pou skotonei
Tora pou tha pas fantaros	1956	Agapi pou skotonei
Ta fragka mou chalao	1956	Agapi pou skotonei
Agapimenoi mou goneis	1959	

==== 1960s ====
Title	Year	Album
Agapi pou egine vrahnas	1969	

==== 1970s ====
Title	Year	Album
Den Se Ksero File	1975	Logia tis Nyxtas (Night Conversations)
Einai Kakourga I Mana Sou	1975	Logia tis Nyxtas (Night Conversations)
Kyra Mou Taverniarisa	1975	Logia tis Nyxtas (Night Conversations)
Den Me Thimase Pia	1975	Logia tis Nyxtas (Night Conversations)
Ksechase Me	1975	Logia tis Nyxtas (Night Conversations)
Chelidonakia	1975	Logia tis Nyxtas (Night Conversations)
Smyrniotopoula Mou	1975	Logia tis Nyxtas (Night Conversations)
Kremastra Sto Sakaki Sou	1975	Logia tis Nyxtas (Night Conversations)
Axioprepia	1975	Logia tis Nyxtas (Night Conversations)
Fora Ta Mavra	1975	Logia tis Nyxtas (Night Conversations)
To Chasapaki	1975	Logia tis Nyxtas (Night Conversations)
Ma Giati Den Mas To Les	1975	Logia tis Nyxtas (Night Conversations)

==== 1990s ====
Title	Year	Album		
Otan akouo Kazantzidi	1990	Otan Akouo Kazantzidi (When I hear about Kazantzidis)		
San episkeptis	1990	Otan Akouo Kazantzidi (When I hear about Kazantzidis)		
Apo agapi tha pethano	1990	Otan Akouo Kazantzidi (When I hear about Kazantzidis)		
Ena paihnidi tychero	1990	Otan Akouo Kazantzidi (When I hear about Kazantzidis)		
As to rixoume stin trela	1990	Otan Akouo Kazantzidi (When I hear about Kazantzidis)		
I Istoria tis Zois mou	1990	Otan Akouo Kazantzidi (When I hear about Kazantzidis)		
Polla Zitas	1990	Otan Akouo Kazantzidi (When I hear about Kazantzidis)		
Ase	1990	Otan Akouo Kazantzidi (When I hear about Kazantzidis)		
Proti mou agapi kai teleftea	1990	Otan Akouo Kazantzidi (When I hear about Kazantzidis)		
Eipa na figo	1990	Otan Akouo Kazantzidi (When I hear about Kazantzidis)		
Den sou eho empistosyni	1990	Otan Akouo Kazantzidi (When I hear about Kazantzidis)		
Mia Gynaika mono Kserei	1993	-		
Sagapo kai den to kryvo	1993	-		
Mia Petra Eroteftika	1993	To Agio Aigaio (Holly Aegean)		
Sagapo Kai Den To Kryvo	1993	To Agio Aigaio (Holly Aegean)		
Ti Tairiasto Zevgari	1993	To Agio Aigaio (Holly Aegean)		
To Derti Einai Derti	1993	To Agio Aigaio (Holly Aegean)		
Kale Geitonissa	1993	To Agio Aigaio (Holly Aegean)		
Ah, Afrodite	1993	To Agio Aigaio (Holly Aegean)		
To Taxidi	1993	To Agio Aigaio (Holly Aegean)		
Samiotissa Se Thelo	1993	To Agio Aigaio (Holly Aegean)		
I Aagapi Mas Na Zisi	1993	To Agio Aigaio (Holly Aegean)		
Kali Katontapyliani	1993	To Agio Aigaio (Holly Aegean)		
Richno Sti Thalassa Gyali	1993	To Agio Aigaio (Holly Aegean)		
Mesa Stin Omorfi Karia	1993	To Agio Aigaio (Holly Aegean)		
Agapite Thee	1994	Tragoudate More! (Let's Go Sing!)		
Mono I Kardia Sou Kserei	1994	Tragoudate More! (Let's Go Sing!)		
An Agkaliaseis Salonikia	1994	Tragoudate More! (Let's Go Sing!)		
Tin Agapi Sou Zito	1994	Tragoudate More! (Let's Go Sing!)		
Tragoudate More	1994	Tragoudate More! (Let's Go Sing!)		
Me Ena Ah	1994	Tragoudate More! (Let's Go Sing!)		
Enoiosa Gynaika	1994	Tragoudate More! (Let's Go Sing!)		
Paraviase	1994	Tragoudate More! (Let's Go Sing!)		
Mi Thareis Pos Eimai Moni	1994	Tragoudate More! (Let's Go Sing!)		
Tha Se Gelaso	1994	Tragoudate More! (Let's Go Sing!)		
Adiorthote aliti	1994	Tragoudate More! (Let's Go Sing!)		
Tha poneseis mia mera	1994	Tragoudate More! (Let's Go Sing!)	1996	Opos Palia (Like The Old Time)
Treli Kai Amartoli			1996	Opos Palia (Like The Old Time)
Symmazepsou			1996	Opos Palia (Like The Old Time)
Na Ha Dyo Zoes			1996	Opos Palia (Like The Old Time)
Opoios Agapise			1996	Opos Palia (Like The Old Time)
Mipos Eisai Apo Vardari			1996	Opos Palia (Like The Old Time)
Posoi Kai Posoi			1996	Opos Palia (Like The Old Time)
Tha Parasyrtho			1996	Opos Palia (Like The Old Time)
Allote			1996	Opos Palia (Like The Old Time)
Ki Epese Nyxta			1996	Opos Palia (Like The Old Time)
Psemata Leei			1996	Opos Palia (Like The Old Time)
Ponane			1996	Opos Palia (Like The Old Time)
