= Christoforos Marinos =

Greek anarchist (1967–1996)

Christoforos Marinos (1967 - July 23, 1996) was a Greek anarchist and hunger striker known for his long involvement with both the police and the controversy surrounding his death.

== Death ==
There is a general haze around the circumstances surrounding his death, which occurred on July 23, 1996. While on house arrest, he travelled to the island of Serifos. When returning, a police special operations unit (EKAM) raided his cabin and found him dead. He was shot and a gun was found next to him.

The Greek authorities have attributed his death to suicide.

== Legacy ==
A song on Dimitris Mitropanos's 2016 album, composed by Thanos Mikroutsikos with verses from Alkis Alkaios's poetry, addresses Marinos.
