= Stamatis Kokotas =

Greek singer (1937–2022)

- Σταμάτης Κόκοτας
- Born: 23 March 1937; Athens, Kingdom of Greece
- Died: 1 October 2022 (aged 85); Voula, Greece
- Occupation: Singer
- Years active: 1966–2019

Stamatis Kokotas (Greek: Σταμάτης Κόκοτας; 23 March 1937 – 1 October 2022) was a Greek folk singer.

== Life and career ==
Kokotas was born on 23 March 1937, at General and Maternity Hospital Helena Venizelou in Athens into a family of six children. He lost his father, a doctor, when he was a small child. On leaving school, he moved to Paris to study medicine, and while there he met Stavros Xarchakos, who helped launch his career. His breakout came in 1966 with the hit "Στου Όθωνα τα χρόνια" ("In the days of King Otto"). Other major hits included the songs "Όνειρο απατηλό" ("Illusory dream") and "Γιέ μου" ("My son"). He collaborated with musicians including Dimos Moutsis, Antonios Katinaris, Giorgos Hatzinasios, Apostolos Kaldaras, Giorgos Zampetas and Giannis Spanos.

Kokotas was married twice and had three children. He died at General Hospital of Voula "Asklepieion", on 1 October 2022, at age 85, four years after being diagnosed with cancer.
