= Manos Eleftheriou =

Greek poet, lyricist and writer (1938–2018)

- Μάνος Ελευθερίου
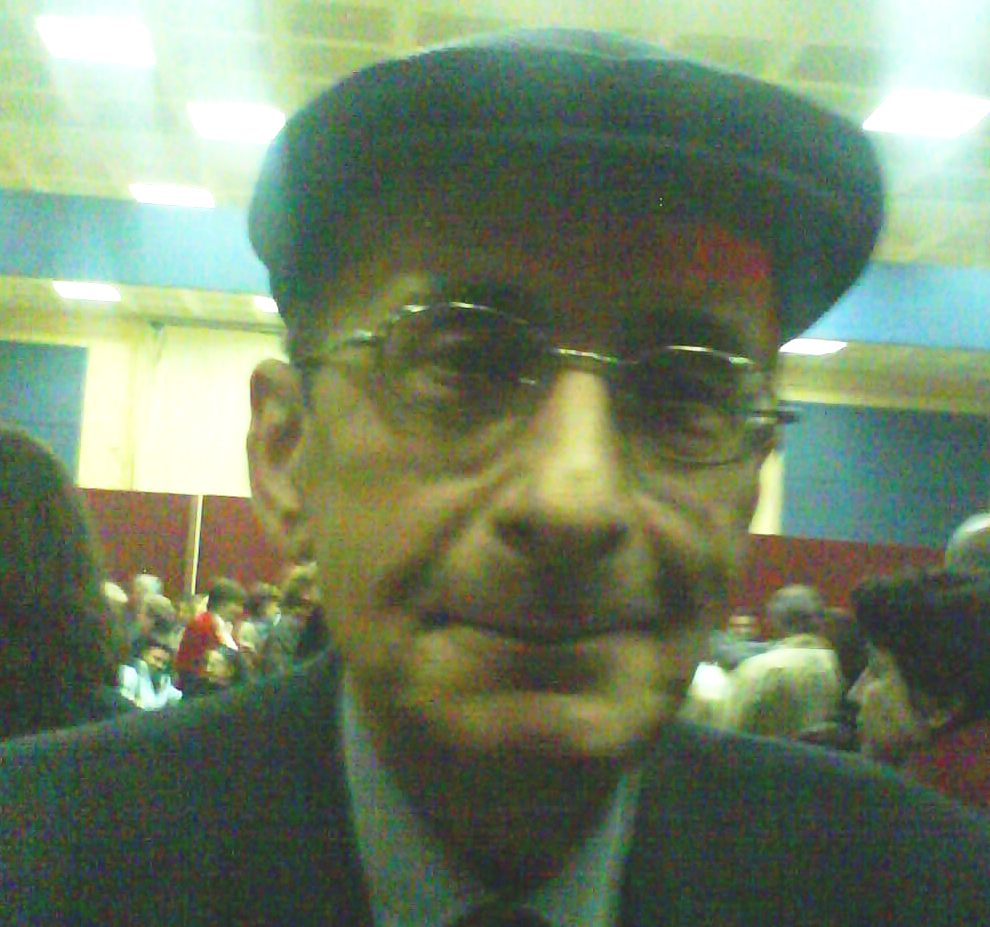
- Eleftheriou in 2008
- Born: 12 March 1938; Ermoupoli, Kingdom of Greece
- Died: 22 July 2018 (aged 80); Athens, Greece
- Education: National Theatre of Greece Drama School
- Occupation: Lyricist

Manos Eleftheriou (Greek: Μάνος Ελευθερίου; 12 March 1938 – 22 July 2018) was a Greek poet, lyricist and prose writer. He had written poetry collections, short stories, a novella, two novels and more than 400 songs. He also worked as a columnist, publishing editor, illustrator and radio producer.

== Biography ==
He was born and raised in Ermoupolis of Syros. His father was a seaman. At the age of 14 he moved with his family from Syros to Athens and for the first seven years, he lived in Chalandri. In 1960, they moved to Neo Psychiko. In 1955, he met Angelos Terzakis, who encouraged him to attend classes at the Drama School of the National Theater as a listener. In 1956, he was enrolled in the theater department of the Stavrakos School with professors Christos Vachliotis, Giorgos Theodosiadis and Grigoris Grigoriou. In 1960, in Ioannina, where he was to perform his military service, he began to write songs and poems.

== Career ==
=== Workshop ===
In 1962, at the age of 24, he published his first poetic collection, entitled Sinoikismos, with his own money but did not have the expected success. At the same time in Ioannina wrote the first lyrics, among them "The train leaves at 8:00", which Mikis Theodorakis later toured.

In October 1963, he began working at Reader's Digest where he stayed for the next sixteen years. In the meantime, they released their first two short stories, The Directorate (1964) and The Massacre (1965), for which excellent reviews were written.

=== Discography ===
In 1964, he appeared in the Greek discography. He collaborated with composer Christos Leonti and Mikis Theodorakis (1967), with whom the collaboration was interrupted due to the Dictatorship. These songs were first released in Paris in 1970.

He also collaborated with Dimos Moutsis and with Yannis Markopoulos on the album Theta, whose recording started in November 1973, interrupted by the events of the Polytechnic and eventually released in 1974 with the Metropolitan.

He collaborated with almost all Greek composers, such as composer Stavros Kouyioumtzis and singer George Dalaras, as well as Thanasis Gaifillias at The Endless Excursion (1975), Manos Hatzidakis, Giannis Spanos, Giorgos Zampetas, Stamatis Kraounakis, Loukianos Kilaidonis, Giorgos Hatzinasios, Antonis Vardis and others.

At the same time, he wrote and illustrated children's fairy tales, while editing the albums on Syros: Symphony, Drama in Ermoupolis and others. In the 1990s, he wrote and made radio shows in Athens 98.4 FM and in the Second Programme (ERT).

In 1994, he released his first novel entitled The Touch of Time. In 2004 he published his first novel, The Chrysanthemum Time, which was honored with the State Prize for Literature in 2005. In 2013, Manos Eleutherios was awarded for his total contribution by the Academy of Athens

He died on 22 July 2018.

== Awards ==
- (2005) State Prize for Literature for his novel "The Time of the Chrysanthemums".
- (2013) Kostas and Eleni Uranis Foundation Award for the whole of his work, Academy of Athens.
