= Dimitris Mitropanos =

Greek singer (1948–2012)

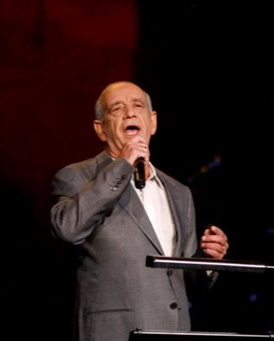

Background information
- Born: 2 April 1948; Trikala, Greece
- Died: 17 April 2012 (aged 64) Ygeia Hospital, Marousi, Greece
- Genres: Laiko
- Occupation: Singer
- Years active: 1964–2012

Dimitris Mitropanos (Greek: Δημήτρης Μητροπάνος; 2 April 1948 – 17 April 2012) was a Greek singer. He was renowned for his mastery of laïkó, a Greek music style.

== Biography ==
Mitropanos was born on 2 April 1948, in Trikala, in northwest Thessaly, beginning his musical career in 1964.

Mitropanos was an Aromanian.

He worked with some of the most renowned Greek composers, such as Mikis Theodorakis, Stavros Xarhakos, Giorgos Zabetas, Manos Hatzidakis, Marios Tokas, and Thanos Mikroutsikos.

== Early years ==
From an early age, Mitropanos worked summers to help his family financially. First as a waiter in his uncle's restaurant and later at ribbon cutting wood. After the third grade of junior high, in 1964, he went to Athens to live with his uncle on Acharnon Street. Before finishing high school, he began working as a singer.

== Career ==
At that time, with some encouragement from Grigoris Bithikotsis, whom he met at a gathering at his uncle's company at which he sang, Mitropanos visited EMI-Lambropoulos Bros. Ltd. (EMIAL S.A.) There, Takis Lampropoulos introduced him to Giorgos Zampetas, with whom he would work alongside at "Ksimeromata". Mitropanos considered Giorgos Zampetas to be a great teacher and a second father to himself. As he stated, "Zambetas is the only man in music who helped me without expecting anything. With all my other colleagues, I got something and I gave something in return." In 1966 Mitropanos met Mikis Theodorakis and sang the Party songs "Romiosini" and "Axion Esti" in a series of concerts in Greece and Cyprus.

In 1967, Mitropanos recorded his first 7" single "Thessaloniki". This followed the recording of "Chameni Paschalia", a song that was censored by the Greek military junta and thus never released.

In a course mapped out by folk art music, 1972 is a milestone. The composer Dimos Moutsis and the lyricist and poet Manos Eleftheriou released "Agios Fevrouarios" with Mitropanos and Petris Salpeas as the song's performers, marking a milestone in Greek music. In July 1999, Mitropanos and Moutsis met again on stage at the "Odeon" with Dimitra Galani and the soprano Julia Souglakou for two nights at the Athens Festival. The concerts were recorded live and released in a double CD two months later. George Katsaros's "The Road to Kythera" and Giorgos Hatzinasios's "Ta Sinaxaria" follow suit, projects of high quality with a high profile in Greek society.

In a long career in the Greek music industry, Dimitris Mitropanos collaborated with leading artists of the Laïko and Éntekhno music. Giorgos Zampetas, Mikis Theodorakis, Dimos Moutsis, Apostolos Kaldaras, Takis Mousafiris, Christos Nikolopoulos ("Pare Apofaseis" with lyrics by Lefteris Papadopoulos), Yannis Spanos were composers with whom Mitropanos collaborated, building a career intertwined with the Laïko tradition, until the late 1980s.

== North American Tour (2010) ==
Mitropanos performed a North American Tour for the first time in 13 years since his last visit to the United States. During his tour, he performed a concert on 1 July 2010 at Radio City Music Hall in front of a near capacity crowd. He performed many of his famous songs that had been written in the earlier stages of his career as well as more recent songs which continue to be popular among Greeks, such as "Roza", "Panta gelastoi", "Ta Ladadika" and many more. It was at this concert that he was accompanied by the Greek folk singer Margarita Zorbala, whose music is well known in their mutual homeland. Mitropanos concluded his concert with a passionate performance of his famous song "Alimono", with all in attendance giving him a standing ovation as he walked off the stage. As is commonplace among Greeks to show appreciation for a singer's performance at the conclusion of a concert, chants of "kialo" followed, meaning "more".

Following his performance at Radio City, Mitropanos cancelled the remainder of his North American tour. Greek news outlets such as ERT reported that Mitropanos was apparently ill and could not finish his tour.

== Death ==
On 17 April 2012, Mitropanos was rushed at Ygeia Hospital after he suffered a heart attack earlier that morning. He had insomnia and showed signs of a pulmonary edema, from which he died of later on that day, at age 64. He was buried in First Cemetery of Athens, not far from the singer Rita Sakellariou. Mitropanos was survived by his two daughters and his wife, Venia. Mitropanos instructed his family not to accept a state funeral if it was offered. It was indeed offered and his family declined the offer and covered the costs of the funeral themselves.

== Notable songs ==
- Πες μου πού πουλάν καρδιές (Pes mou pou poulan kardies, Tell me where they are selling hearts)
- Κυρά ζωή (Kira Zoi, Ms life)
- Άλλος για Χίο τράβηξε κι άλλος για Μυτιλήνη (Alos yia Chio travixe ki alos yia Mitilini, Someone sailed to Chios and someone else to Mitilini)
- Σ'αναζητώ στη Σαλονίκη (S'anazito sti Saloniki, Searching for you in Salonika)
- Ρόζα (Roza, Rose)
- Έρωτας Αρχάγγελος (Erotas Archagelos)
- Tα Λαδάδικα (Ta Ladadika, The greasy sites (referring to the brothels))
- Έρχονται βράδια (Erhonte vradia, Some nights come)
- Πάντα γελαστοί (Panta gelastoi, Always smiling)
- Σβήσε το φεγγάρι (Svise to fegari, Erase the moon)
- Αλίμονο (Alimono, Alas)
- Για να σ' εκδικηθώ (Yia na se ekdikitho, To revenge you)
- Δώσε μου φωτιά (Dose mou fotia, Give me fire)
- Τι το θες το κουταλάκι (Tee to thes to koutalaki, What do you need the spoon for?)
- Απόψε θα 'θελα (Apopse tha 'thela, Tonight I'd like to)
