= Maria Dimitriadi =

- Born: 11 April 1950; Athens, Greece
- Died: 6 January 2009 (aged 58) Athens, Greece
- Occupation: Singer
- Instrument: Vocals
- Years active: 1969–2001

Maria Dimitriadi (Greek: Μαρία Δημητριάδη; 11 April 1950 – 6 January 2009), was a Greek singer. She was one of the most renowned performers of the songs of Mikis Theodorakis and Thanos Mikroutsikos. Dimitriadi primarily connected with political left-wing songs during the Junta and Metapolitefsi era in Greece, but she also experimented with other styles and genres, of a more lyrical tone.

== Biography ==
Maria Dimitriadi was born on 11 April 1950 in the Athenian municipality of Tavros, where later she became a member of the municipal council. She was the older sister of the acclaimed Greek singer Aphrodite Manou.

Her career was connected with some of the greatest Greek composers, such as Stavros Xarhakos, with whom she recorded her debut single, "Ένα πρωινό", Mikis Theodorakis, Thanos Mikroutsikos, Kostas Grigoreas, Madra Mandicencio, and later on, Giannis Markopoulos and Manos Hadjidakis.

In the early 1970s, during the military dictatorship in Greece, she was in Europe and toured with Theodorakis for four years. She continued to work with him until the early 1990s. In 1974, Dimitriadi returned to Greece and, in the following years, she started working almost exclusively with Mikroutsikos. In these years she became a member of the Revolutionary Communist Movement of Greece (EKKE) and she was elected counsellor to serve on the Municipal Council of Tavros, a suburb in the south-western part of Athens in Greece.

In 1980, she signed for CBS Records and started her solo career. From 1991 to 1993, Dimitiradi lived and worked in former Yugoslavia and strongly opposed the embargo on Yugoslavia.

She had a son, Stergios, with Greek television presenter Andreas Mikroutsikos. In later years, she had withdrawn from active singing and recording and became a sympathizer of the Communist Party of Greece (KKE).

On 6 January 2009, Maria Dimitriadi died at the age of 58 in the Evangelismos General Hospital in Athens from a rare lung disease.
