= Dimos Moutsis =

Greek singer-songwriter and composer (1938–2024)

- Δήμος Μούτσης
- Born: Dimitrios Moutsis; 2 August 1938; Piraeus, Greece
- Died: 6 March 2024 (aged 85); Athens, Greece
- Occupations: Singer; songwriter; composer
- Years active: 1967–2024
- Musical career
- Genres: Entekhno; Laïko
- Instruments: Vocals; guitar; piano; violin

Dimos Moutsis (Greek: Δήμος Μούτσης, pronounced [ˈðimos ˈmut͡sis]; 2 August 1938 – 6 March 2024) was a Greek singer-songwriter and composer.

== Biography ==
Moutsis was born in Piraeus. He was a student of the violin at the Athens Conservatoire from the age of seven and graduated at the age of twenty one as a prize-winning soloist. During the late 1960s, he met poet and lyricist Nikos Gatsos and fellow composer Manos Hatzidakis at a cafeteria which was a well-known haunt for musicians and artists (Flokas).

In 1967, Gatsos began to provide Moutsis with poetry he had written, thus allowing Moutsis to write his first songs. The first song Moutsis wrote was 'Βρέχει ο Θεός' ('God is raining'), a piece he had already composed the music for and for which Gatsos provided lyrics. The singer Stamatis Kokotas was the first to record this song. Over the next few years, he continued to write songs with Gatsos which were recorded by well-known artists of the time such as Vicky Moscholiou and Grigoris Bithikotsis, as well as with newcomers such as Manolis Mitsias and Dimitra Galani. In 1970, Moutsis orchestrated and produced the music for album 'Επιστροφή', with songs by Hatzidakis and Gatsos. During the same period, Moutsis worked with other lyricists such as Lefteris Papadopoulos.

Moutsis was a candidate for MeRA25 in the 2019 European Parliament elections.

Dimos Moutsis died on 6 March 2024, at the age of 85.

== Discography ==
Albums
Year	Greek Title	Transliteration	Translation	Lyricist
1968	Κάποιο Καλοκαίρι	Kapoio Kalokairi	Some Summer	Nikos Gatsos
1969	Ένα Χαμόγελο	Ena Chamogelo	A smile	Nikos Gatsos
1972	Άγιος Φεβρουάριος	Agios Fevrouarios	Holy February	Manos Eleftheriou
1972	Συνοικισμός Α'	Synoikismos A'	Settlement I	Nikos Gatsos, Giannis Logothetis, Barbara Tsimpouli
1973	Στροφές	Strofes'	Turns	Manos Eleftheriou, Nikos Gatsos, Giannis Logothetis, Pythagoras Papastamatiou
1973	Πρώτη Εκτέλεση	Proti Ektelesi	First Performance	Vasilis Andreopoulos, Nikos Gatsos, Lefteris Papadopoulos, G. Stefanou
1974	Μαρτυρίες	Martyries	Testimonies	Giorgos Chronas, Manos Eleftheriou, Giannis Logothetis
1975	Τετραλογία	Tetralogia	Tetralogy	Constantine P. Cavafy, Kostas Karyotakis, Yiannis Ritsos, Giorgos Seferis
1976	Εργατική Συμφωνία	Ergatiki Symfonia	Labour Agreement	Giorgos Skourtis (from the play Απεργία)
1979	Το Δρομολόγιο	To Dromologio	The Timetable	Nikos Gatsos
1980	Χρυσές Επιτυχίες	Chryses Epitychies	Golden Hits	
1981	Φράγμα	Fragma	Barrier	Kostas Tripolitis
1983	Ενέχυρο	Enechyro	Pledge	Dimos Moutsis
1987	Να!	Na!	There!	Dimos Moutsis
1987	Πρώτες Εκτελέσεις	Protes Ekteleseis	First Performances	
1990	Ταξιδιώτης του Παντός	Taxidiotis tou Pantos	Traveller of Everywhere	Dimos Moutsis
1994	Για Πούλημα Λοιπόν	Gia Poulima Loipon	For Sale, Then	Dimos Moutsis
1999	Ηρώδειο	Irodeio	Odeon (Live Recording)	
2000	Οι 100 Μεγάλες Ηχογραφήσεις του Αιώνα	Oi 100 Megales Ichografiseis tou Aiona	The 100 Great Recordings of the Century (Tetralogy)	
2006	Τα Τραγούδια του Δήμου Μούτση	Ta Tragoudia tou Dimou Moutsi	The Songs of Dimos Moutsis (Compilation)	
2007	14 Μεγάλα Τραγούδια	14 Megala Tragoudia	14 Great Songs (Compilation)	
2009	Ταξιδιώτης του Παντός – 4 Δεκαετίες Τραγούδια	Taxidiotis tou Pantos – 4 Dekaeties Tragoudia	Traveller of Everywhere – 4 Decades of Songs	

== Music for theatre ==
Plays
Greek Title	Transliteration	Translation	Playwright
Νεφέλες	Nefeles	The Clouds	Aristophanes
50 Χρόνια Δάκρυα 50 Χρόνια Γέλιο	50 Chronia Dakrya 50 Chronia Gelio	50 Years of Tears 50 Years of Laughter	Kostas Karagiannis
Λεπρέντης	Leprentis	Leprentis	Michail Chourmouzis
Απεργία	Apergia	Strike	Giorgos Skourtis

== Music for film ==
Plays
Year	Greek Title	Transliteration	Translation	Director
1969	Ένας Μάγκας Στα Σαλόνια	Enas Magkas Sta Salonia	A Mangas In The Salons	Kostas Karagiannis
1970	Ένα Αστείο Κορίτσι	Ena Asteio Koritsi	A Funny Girl	Takis Vougiouklakis
