= Epitaphios (Ritsos) =

Poem by Yiannis Ritsos

- by Giannis Ritsos
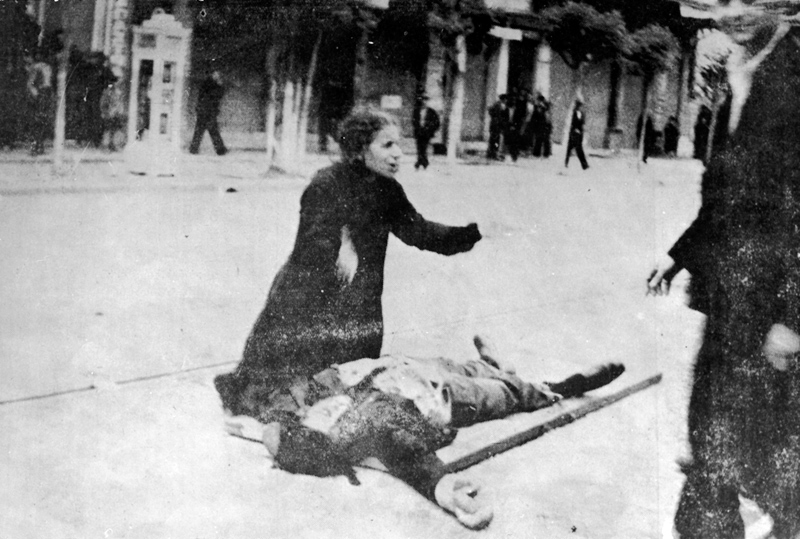
- The poem was inspired by this picture.
- Original title: Επιτάφιος
- Written: 1936 (89 years ago)
- First published in: Rizospastis
- Country: Greece
- Language: Greek
- Series: Moiroloi
- Form: Funeral Procession
- Publication date: 8 June 1936
- Lines: 224 (1st ed.); 324 (2nd ed.)

"Epitaphios" (Greek: Επιτάφιος, "Epitaph") is a poem by Yiannis Ritsos published in 1936.

== Inspiration ==
In May 1936, Ritsos had read about the great strike and demonstration of the tobacco workers of Thessaloniki in the newspaper Rizospastis. The peaceful protest had been drowned in blood by the dictatorial government of Ioannis Metaxas, with a total of twelve dead workers. The article included a photograph depicting a mother mourning over her dead child. This photo had a huge impact on Ritsos, and inspired him to write the poem:

I was locked in the attic of my house for two days and nights and I was writing, without eating and sleeping, on the third day, I couldn't stand it, I started to collapse...

He then delivered the first three poems to Euthyfronas Iliadis, who published them in Rizospastis.

== Editions ==
The poem first appeared as a work of 44 verses in Rizospastis on 12 May 1936, with a dedication to the workers of Thessaloniki. Soon after, a fuller version of 224 verses was published.

A first edition of 10,000 copies sold out almost entirely, a record number for these years. However, in August 1936 Ioannis Metaxas established the anti-communist 4th of August Regime, and the 250 remaining copies were burned at the Temple of Olympian Zeus at Athens, along with other "subversive" books.

The final text was published in a second edition in 1956, and runs to 324 verses divided into 20 parts or cantos, each with 16 verses in eight couplets, except for the last two, which run to 15 verses in nine couplets.

"Epitaphios" is Ritsos' most celebrated poem, as well as the work that made him known to the public.

== Musical setting ==
In 1960, composer Mikis Theodorakis set the poem to music. His composition combines "elements of the old Byzantine traditions, based on church plainsong and the Greek modes, with folk music and its more recent vocal and instrumental styles". With Grigoris Bithikotsis (vocals) and Manolis Chiotis (bouzouki), the recording featured two famous Rembetiko masters. Due to the seemingly popular style, Ritsos' 'high-art' lyrics became well known to Greeks across all social classes.
