= Pterolophosoma =

Pterolophosoma Temporal range: Burdigalian

Scientific classification
- Kingdom: Animalia
- Phylum: Arthropoda
- Clade: Pancrustacea
- Class: Insecta
- Order: Coleoptera
- Suborder: Polyphaga
- Infraorder: Cucujiformia
- Family: Cerambycidae
- Genus: †Pterolophosoma
- Species: †P. otiliae

Binomial name
- †Pterolophosoma otiliae Vitali, 2006

Extinct genus of beetles

Pterolophosoma is an extinct genus of beetle in the family Cerambycidae, containing a single known species, Pterolophosoma otiliae. It was described by Vitali in 2006 who found it in a Dominican amber dating to Early Miocene.
