= Stamatis Kraounakis =

Stamatis Kraounakis Σταμάτης Κραουνάκης
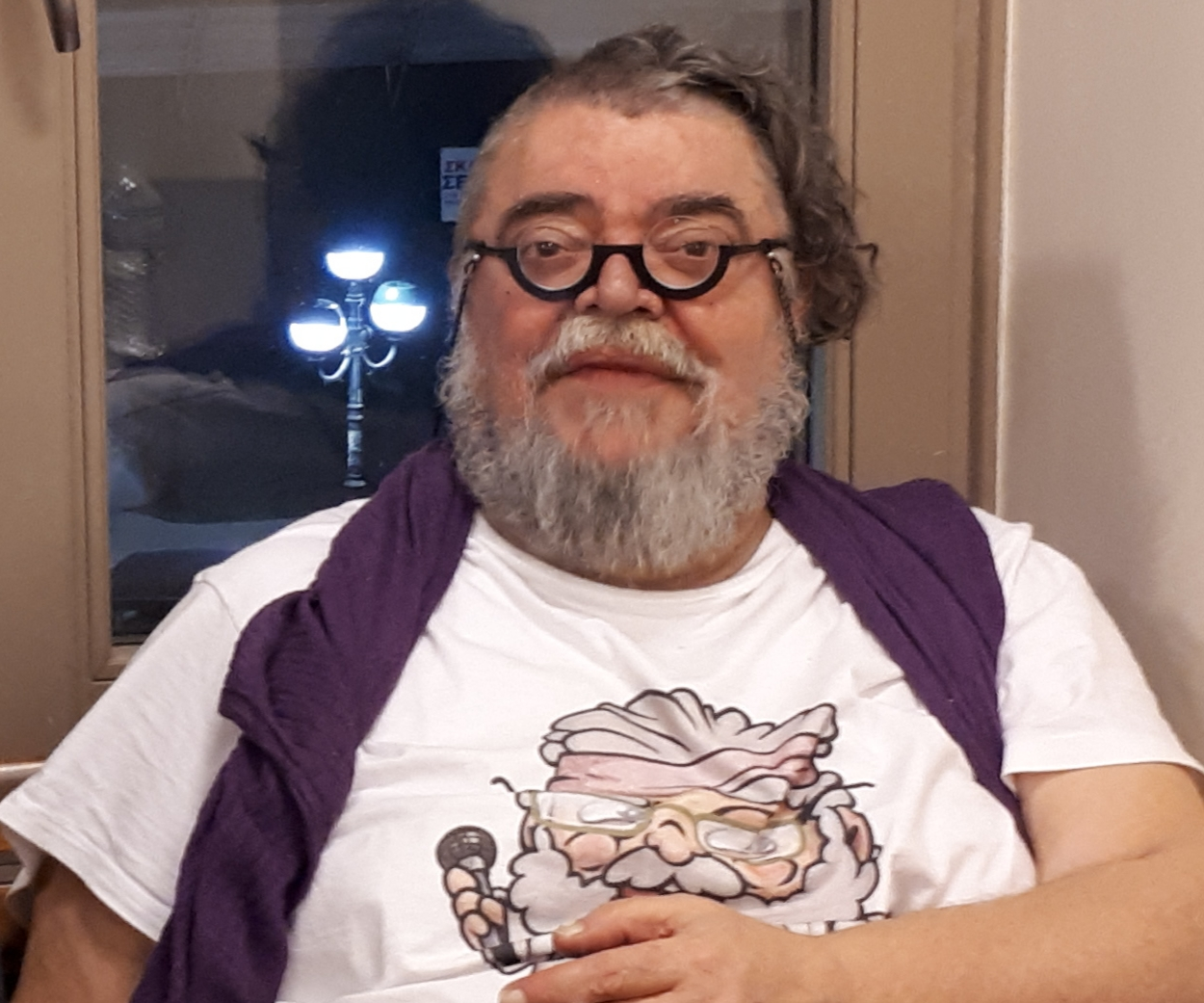
- Stamatis kraounakis in 2022

Background information
- Born: 25 December 1955 (age 70)
- Origin: Athens, Greece
- Genres: Musical shows, Theatre, Cinema, Television
- Occupation: Composer
- Years active: 1977 - present
- Website: http://www.kraounakis.gr

Stamatis Kraounakis (Greek: Σταμάτης Κραουνάκης [staˈmatis kɾauˈnacis]; born 25 December 1955) is a Greek music composer, music producer, lyricist, writer and director. He was born and lives in Athens and has studied Political Science in Panteion University. He has composed music for more than 40 albums and 50 theatre plays.

== Biography ==
Kraounakis studied music with Klelia Terzakis and made his first appearance in 1978, writing the music for the album To Spiti Tou Agamemnona. One year earlier he had made his debut in theatre, with the music for the performance Varieme (1977). In 1981 he made his first big collaboration, with the music for the album Skouriasmena Hilia (Σκουριασμένα χείλια) performed by Vicky Mosholiou.

In Panteion University Kraounakis met the poet Lina Nikolakopoulou, with whom he produced more than 80% of his work. In October 1985 they created and released the album Kikloforo Ki Oploforo with Alkistis Protopsalti as leading singer.

Since 1982 Kraounakis has collaborated with a number of important Greek singers, including Manolis Mitsias, Dimitra Galani, Tania Tsanaklidou, Eleftheria Arvanitaki. He also introduced new singers through collaborations, including Kostas Makedonas, Dimitris Basis, Stelios Dionisiou, and Polina Misailidou.

In 1997 he accepted the position of artistic director at the Municipal Theater of the city of Kavala, where he directed three significant productions - Ktistes by Giorgos Chimonas, Gro Plan by Giorgos Maniotis, and Aristophanes' Plutus under the direction of Nikos Mastorakis.

In 1998, Kraounakis directed a group of young actors called Speira Speira, which successfully performed the All in Black and a Piano show from October 1999 to April 2001.

In 2000 his music for the movie of Nikos Panagiotopoulos Afti I Nihta Menei won the National Award in Thessaloniki Film Festival, while his music for the TV series Istera Irthan I Melisses won the Award for Best Music in the Television Awards. In 2002 his music for the movie Kourastika Na Skotono Tous Agapitikous Sou (Tired of Killing Your Lovers) won the Arion Award for Best Soundtrack.

During 2004 Stamatis Kraounakis composed the music for Delivery, as well as music for Aristophanes' Ploutos for the Athens Festival in Epidavros. In May 2004 he was invited by the Royal Academy of Dramatic Art in London to compose music for the project "Installation 496".

He has written the theme song for one of the most popular TV series in Greece, Maria, i Aschimi, the Greek version of Ugly Betty.

In 2010 he voiced Louis the alligator in the Greek language version of The Princess and the Frog.

In an interview given in the August 2020 edition of Antivirus magazine, Kraounakis came out as LGBT, emphasizing that although as an artist he belongs to the whole world, he was always a part [of the LGBT community], "I'm panerotic. I could fall in love with a 90-year-old person and devote myself to them, whether they are a man or a woman."

== Discography ==
- Album discography: 60 albums and 14 collaborations
- Shows: music for 20 shows and one ballet
- Theatre: music for 54 performances (31 contemporary theatre, nine comedies, eight dramas, six children's plays)
- Cinema: music for four films
- Television: music for six TV series
