= Vicky Moscholiou =

- Born: Vasiliki Moscholiou; May 23, 1943; Athens, Greece
- Died: August 16, 2005 (aged 62) Athens, Greece
- Genre: Laiko
- Years active: 1962–2005

Vicky Moscholiou (Greek: Βίκυ Μοσχολιού [ˈvici mosxoˈʎu]; 23 May 1943 – 16 August 2005), was a Greek performer with a significant repertoire and a huge contribution to the Greek culture and the history of lyrical (entechno) and urban folk (laiko) song. Manos Hatzidakis described her voice as "the cello of Greek music", while Mikis Theodorakis called her "a singer resembling an ancient Doric boulder". Yannis Tsarouchis had said that "Vicky Moscholiou is the Kotopouli of Greek song.”

== Biography ==
=== Early years ===
Vicky (Vasiliki) Moscholiou was born on 23 May 1943 in Metaxourgeio, a poor working-class district of Athens, and grew up in the difficult post-war years. She lived with her family (three kids, her parents, her grandmother) in a large room in a courtyard where there were two other large rooms that housed two other families. Her father worked in the vegetable market while her mother, who suffered from tuberculosis, washed clothes to supplement the family's income. With whatever money they had collected they bought an off-plan plot of land, in Agia Varvara in Egaleo, and built themselves a makeshift arbitrary structure where they lived. At the age of 12 (1955), he quits school and starts working in a shoe factory as "cordeliastra", (a trimmer, lining and piecing together the upper parts of shoes). In the factory he worked 12 hours a day, earning the basic wage of an unskilled worker - 50 drachmas per day.

When her father fell ill with heart failure, the family desperately needed money, and a cousin who was already a bouzoukia singer managed to convince her parents - and especially her father's strict authorities - to let Vicky sing there, where she would be paid 150 drachmas a night. So, at Easter 1962, Moscholiou started working in the nightclub where her cousin also worked, the popular "Trianna Tou Hila" nightclub on Syngrou Avenue. The club's big names were Grigoris Bithikotsis and Dukissa, while Moscholiou, along with other girls, sat on the stage from nine o'clock, singing and clapping along to keep the customers entertained.

=== Career and commercial success ===
She rose to fame in 1964 with Stavros Xarhakos' song "Hathike to feggari" (The Moon is Lost), which was composed for the movie Lola. According to Bithikotsis, the composer Xarhakos told Bithikotsis he needed a singer with a different kind of voice for a particular song. Bithikotsis suggested he try Moscholiou, and took her along to be auditioned. However, Giorgos Zampetas remembers things differently.

"One day Stavros Xarhakos came to the shop. Lambropoulos had instructed him to get Moscholiou to sing a song in a film. He fancied her a lot. We regarded her as just a 200 drachma singer. I took 850 drachmas and Bithikotsis—I don’t know. And he takes Moscholiou to record and me to play bouzouki."

Moscholiou continued with collaborations with Giorgos Zambetas, Manos Eleutheriou, Giorgos Katsaros, Akis Panou, and Loukianos Kilaidonis, among other well-known composers and songwriters. Songs she was famous for include "Paei, paei", "Aliti", "Pou pas choris agapi", "Nautis bgike sti steria", "Ta deilina", "Oi metanastes", and "Anthropoi monachoi".

Two of her hits gave their names to night clubs in Athens, "Deilina" (Dusks) and "Ximeromata" (Daybreaks). She was one of the first in Greece to sing both in night clubs and concerts, and she also sang in the royal courts of Greece, Persia and Jordan. She was one of the first entertainers to sing in aid of Cyprus.

=== Personal life ===
In 1967, Moscholiou married the soccer legend Mimis Domazos, although later they divorced. They had two daughters, Evangelia and Rania.

She died in Athens in 2005 following a two-year battle with cancer, leaving a legacy of significant cultural achievements.

In 2008, following a public dispute between Moscholiou's two daughters, the villa she lived in Thrakomakedones was sold fully furnished to the wealthy goldsmith Panagiotis Stylianoudis and his spouse Villy Kamarinopoulou.

== Discography ==
- 1966: Ένα Μεσημέρι
- 1967: Θαλασσινά φεγγάρια (Συμμετοχή)
- 1969: Κόσμε αγάπη μου
- 1969: Μια Κυριακή
- 1970: Βίκυ Μοσχολιού
- 1970: Το Σαββατόβραδο
- 1972: Περιπέτειες
- 1972: Συνοικισμός Α
- 1973: Στροφές.
- 1973: Τραγουδά Ξαρχάκο Σπανό
- 1974: Νυν και αεί
- 1975: Λαϊκή Παράδοση (Συμμετοχή)
- 1975: Σκοπευτήριο (Συμμετοχή)
- 1976: Ανεξάρτητα (Συμμετοχή)
- 1976: Λεύκωμα
- 1976: Τα Σήμαντρα (Συμμετοχή) Νομικός
- 1977: 14 Χρυσές Επιτυχίες
- 1977: Τραγουδά Σπανό
- 1978: 14 Χρυσές Επιτυχίες 2
- 1978: Λαϊκά τραγούδια απ' όλο τον κόσμο
- 1979: Όταν σε περιμένω
- 1980: Βίκυ Μοσχολιού
- 1980: Το Τραμ Το Τελευταίο
- 1981: Σκουριασμένα χείλια
- 1982: Αξέχαστες Επιτυχίες
- 1982: Σ΄ένα Κόσμο σαν κι αυτό
- 1982: Τραγούδια της Ευτυχίας
- 1983: Αξέχαστες Επιτυχίες 2
- 1984: Του σίδερου και του νερού
- 1986: Στους ανήσυχους δρόμους
- 1987: Γυμνό
- 1987: Κόκοτας - Μοσχολιού
- 1990: Εφημερία
- 1990: Gro plan
- 1990: Η Αθήνα τη νύχτα
- 1990: Μεγάλες Επιτυχίες
- 1991: Γειά σας που πέφτουν τα σύνορα (Συμμετοχή)
- 1992: Το καινούριο πράμα
- 1993: Τα Μπιζουδάκια
- 1994: Από τους θησαυρούς των 45 στροφών
- 1995: Ο Τζακ Ο΄ Χάρα
- 1995: Οι Μεγάλες Επιτυχίες
- 1995: Τραγουδά Ζαμπέτα
- 1996: Μια γυναίκα δύο άντρες
- 1996: Τραγουδάει Αρχοντορεμπέτικα
- 1996: Τραγούδια από τις 45 στροφές
- 1997: Αξέχαστες επιτυχίες 3
- 1998: Οι Μεγάλες φωνές του Ελληνικού τραγουδιού
- 2000: Τραγούδια από τις 45 στροφές 2
- 2001: Οι Μεγάλες Επιτυχίες 1
- 2002: Μεγάλοι Έλληνες Ερμηνευτές 2
- 2002: Ανοιχτό Βιβλίο
- 2003: Πήρα απ΄τη Νιότη Χρώματα
- 2004: Οι Μεγάλες Επιτυχίες 2
- 2004: Βραδυνό σινιάλο
- 2005: Εγώ εσένα αγαπώ
- 2005: Μοσχολιού Βίκυ 40 Χρόνια
- 2005: 21 Μεγάλα τραγούδια
- 2006: Τα Κινηματογραφικά
- 2006: Στα εννέα όγδοα
- 2008: Βίκυ Μοσχολιού: Δεν ξέρω πόσο σ' αγαπώ (a "best-of" compilation in a box set of six CDs)

== Bibliography ==
- Βίκυ Μοσχολιού: Δεν ξέρω πόσο σ' αγαπώ (biography) by Κώστας Μπαλαχούτης, 2008 (A booklet accompanying the box set with the same title)
