= Nikos Gatsos =

Greek poet and translator (1911–1992)

- Νίκος Γκάτσος
- Born: 8 December 1911; Asea, Arcadia, Greece
- Died: 12 May 1992 (aged 80); Athens, Greece
- Occupations: Poet, translator, lyricist

Nikos Gatsos (Greek: Νίκος Γκάτσος; 8 December 1911 – 12 May 1992) was a Greek poet, translator and lyricist.

== Biography ==
According to Harvard University, he "had a profound influence on the post-war generation of Greek poets. Writing of both loss and hope, Gatsos’s unique blend of surrealism, symbolism and folk song created intense admiration and assured his place alongside his friends, Nobel laureates Odysseas Elytis and George Seferis, as one of the great twentieth-century Greek poets".

Nikos Gatsos was born in 1911 in Asea in Arcadia, a district of the Peloponnese, where he finished primary school (dimotiko). He attended high school (gymnasio) in Tripoli, where he became acquainted with literature and foreign languages. Afterwards, he moved to Athens, where he studied literature, philosophy, and history at the University of Athens for two years only. His knowledge of English and French was quite good and he was already familiar with Kostis Palamas, Dionysios Solomos, Greek folk songs, and recent trends in European poetry. In Athens, he came in contact with the literary circles of the day becoming one of the lifelong friends of fellow poet Odysseus Elytis and published his poems, small in extent and in a classic style, in the magazines Nea Estia (1931–32) and Rythmos (1933). During that period he also published criticism in Makedonikes Imeres (Μακεδονικές Ημέρες), Rythmos (Ρυθμός), and Nea Grammata (Νέα Γράμματα) (for Kostis Bastias, Myrtiotissa, and Thrasos Kastanakis, respectively).

In 1936, he met Odysseus Elytis, and became his literary "brother" in poetry. In 1943, Aetos published his long poem Amorgos, a major contribution to contemporary Greek poetry notable especially for its combination of surrealism with traditional Greek folk poetry motifs. He subsequently published three more poems: "Elegeio" (1946) in Filologika Chronika, "The Knight and Death" (Ο ιππότης κι ο θάνατος) (1947), and "Song of Old Times" (Τραγούδι του παλιού καιρού) (1963), dedicated to Yorgos Seferis, in the magazine Tachydromos.

After World War II, he worked with the Greek-British Review as a translator and with Ellinikí Radiofonía as a radio director. During that period he also began writing lyrics for Manos Hadjidakis. In due course, he also collaborated with Mikis Theodorakis and other notable composers. His hard and language skills were noticed by the "Art Theatre", the "Greek National Theatre" and the "Popular Theatre" of Greece, and entrusted him to translate various plays - his magnum opus was the translation in Greek of the Spanish tragedy "Blood Wedding" by Federico Garcia Lorca.

He was close to Manos Hadjidakis and Nana Mouskouri. His friends included Philip Sherrard, Peter Levi, Peter Jay, and Desmond O'Grady.

He died in Athens on 12 May 1992, aged 80.

== Amorgos poems ==
The poems in Amorgos are marked by their atmospheric qualities, as the poet seeks to capture the unique beauty and character of the island through vivid imagery and emotional depth. The collection has been praised for its poetic grandeur, as well as its ability to convey deep emotions and themes, such as love, loss, and the fragility of human existence. Gatsos' work is noted for its originality, as he pushes the boundaries of traditional poetic forms and styles. Gatsos' Amorgos is an essential work in modern Greek literature, offering readers a powerful and moving experience that showcases the beauty and complexity of human emotions.

From Amorgos I

With their country tied to their sails and their oars hung on the wind,
The shipwrecked slept tamely like dead beasts on a bedding of sponges,
But the eyes of seaweed are turned toward the sea hoping the South Wind will bring them back with their lateen-sails new-painted,
For one lost elephant is always worth much more than the quivering breasts of a girl,
Only if the roofs of deserted chappels should light up with the caprice of the Evening Star,
Only if birds should ripple amid the masts of the lemon trees.

With the firm white flurry of lively footsteps,
Will the winds come, the bodies of swans that remained immaculate, unmoving and tender,
When steamrollers rolled through shops, when hurricanes whirled through vegetation,
When the eyes of women became coal and the hearts of the chestnut hawkers were broken,
When the harvest was done and the hopes of crickets began.

And indeed this is why, my brave young men, with kisses, wine, and leaves on your mouth,
I would like to stride naked by the rivers to sing of the Barbary Coast like the woodsman hunting the mastic shrub,
Like the viper slithering through gardens of barley,
With the proud eyes of irritation,
Like the lightning-bolt as it threshes youth.

And do not laugh and do not weep and do not rejoice,
And do not squeeze your shoes in vain as though you were planting plane trees,
Do not become DESTINY,
For the king-eagle is not a closed drawer,
It is not the tear of the plum tree nor a smile of the water-lily,
Nor the undershirt of a pigeon or a Sultan's mandolin,
Nor a silken shawl for the head of the whale,
It is a saw of the sea which rips the seagulls apart,
It is a carpenter's pillow, a beggar's watch,
It is a flame in the blacksmith's shop teasing the wives of the priests and lulling the lilies,
It is a wedding procession of Turks, a festival of Australians,
It is the hideaway of Hungarian gypsies,
Where the hazel trees in autumn secretly congregate,
They watch the sensible storks painting their eggs black,
And then they also weep,
They burn their nightgowns and dress themselves in the duck's petticoat,
They strew stars on the earth for kings to walk upon,
With their silver amulets with their crowns and their purple mantles,
They strew rosemary in garden plots,
That mice may pass on their way to other cellars,
And to other cathedrals to eat of the Holy Altars,
And the owls, my lads,
The owls growl,
And dead nuns rise up to dance,
With tambourines and drums and violins, with bagpipes and lutes,
With bannerets and censors, with wimples and magic veils,
With the pantaloons of bears in the frozen valley,
They eat the mushrooms of martens,
They play heads or tails with the ring of St. John and the gold florins of the Blackamoor,
They mock all witches,
They cut off the beard of a priest with the yataghan of Kolokotronis,
They bathe themselves in the vapours of incense,
And afterwards, slowly chanting, enter the earth again and fall silent,
As waves fall silent, as the cuckoo bird at dawn, as the oil lamp at evening.

And thus in deep jar the grape shrivels and in the belfry of a fig tree the apple turns yellow
And thus flaunting a gay-coloured necktie
Under a grapevine bower the summer suspires
And thus naked among white cherry trees a tender love of mine lies sleeping
A girl as unwithering as a branch of almond
Her head resting on her elbow and her palm on her golden treasure
On its dawning warmth while slowly and softly like a thief
From the window of spring the Morning Star comes to awake her.

== Translations ==
Gatsos spent much of his effort & time in translating plays from various languages in Greek, mainly for the Greek National Theatre, the Greek Theatre of Art, and the Greek Popular Theatre. In 1944, he translated (for Filologika Chronika) the poem "Night song" by Federico García Lorca. He also translated the following plays:

- Federico García Lorca
  - Blood Wedding
  - The House of Bernarda Alba
- August Strindberg
  - The Father
- Eugene O'Neill
  - Long Day's Journey Into Night

All of the plays he translated were staged at the Greek National Theatre and the Greek Theatre of Art. He associated with the magazines Nea Estia, Tram, Makedonikes Imeres, Mikro Tetradio, Nea Grammata, Filologika Chronika, and Kallitechnika Nea. In addition, he directed plays during his association with Greek radio.

== Lyrics ==
Gatsos's work garnered international prominence. He wrote lyrics for major Greek composers, such as, Manos Hadjidakis, Mikis Theodorakis, Stavros Xarchakos, Dimos Moutsis, Loukianos Kilaidonis, and Eleni Karaindrou. He wrote lyrics for several films, including Elia Kazan's America America.

== Select bibliography ==
The following bibliography includes Gatsos' major publications in Greek and books consisting of or including a substantial number of English translations of Gatsos' writings. The Greek text of Amorgos, Gatsos' most famous work, is not given an individual entry since it went through a number of editions in Greek, most of which are now out of print.

- Nikos Gatsos. Theatro kai poiēsē: Phederiko Gkarthia Lorka. Hellēnikē apodosē. Ikaros 1990.
- Nikos Gatsos. Physa aeraki, physa me mē chamēlōneis isame. prometōpida Odyssea Elytē; partitoura Manou Chatzidaki. Ikaros Ekdotikē Hetairia 1992.
- Nikos Gatsos. Amorgos. translated by Sally Purcell. (1980; repr. 1986; repr. London, Anvil Press Poetry, 1998.
- M. Byron Raizis. Greek Poetry Translations. Athens, Efstathiadis, 1981.
- Peter Bien, Peter Constantine, Edmund Keeley, Karen Van Dyck. A century of Greek poetry:1900-2000, Bilingual ed. River Vale, NJ, Cosmos Pub., 2004.
- The Charioteer: An Annual Review of Modern Greek Culture number 36 1995-1996 (Special double issue Nikos Gatsos)
- Kimon Friar. Modern Greek Poetry. Athens, Edstathiadis, 1993.
