= Thanos Mikroutsikos =

Greek composer and politician (1947–2019)

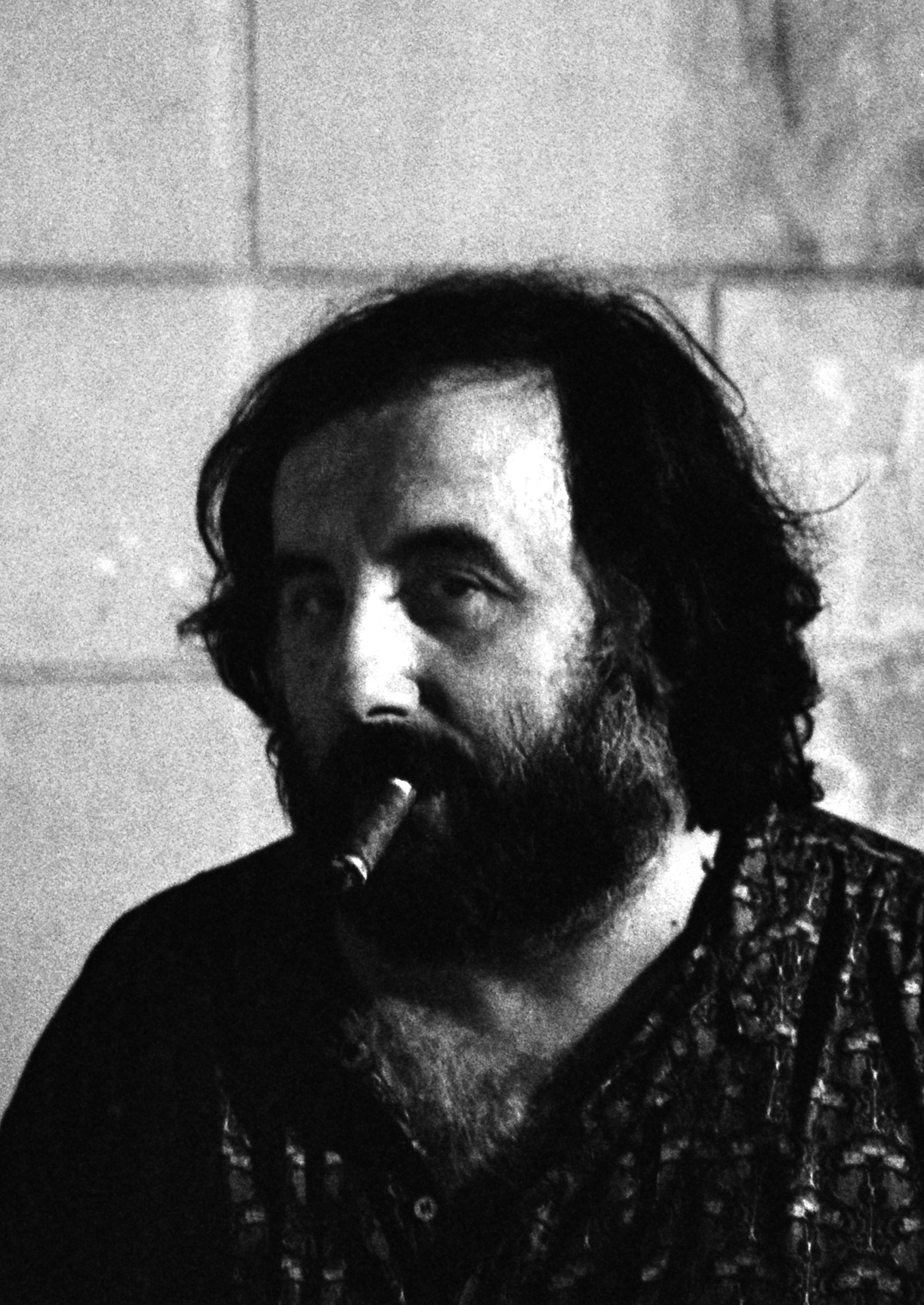
- Mikroutsikos in Athens, 1991

Background information
- Born: Athanasios Mikroutsikos; 13 April 1947; Patras, Greece
- Died: 28 December 2019 (aged 72) Athens, Greece
- Genre: Éntekhno
- Occupations: Composer, musician, politician
- Instrument: Piano
- Years active: 1975–2019
- Labels: Lyra Records, Minos EMI, CBS Records International, Polydor Records
- Spouses: Koralia Sotiriadou (divorced); Irene Inglesi (m. 1978; div. 1992); Maria Papayanni (m. 1996)
- Website: www.mikroutsikos.gr

Minister for Culture
- In office 16 March 1994 – 22 January 1996; Acting: 6 – 16 March 1994
- Prime Minister: Andreas Papandreou
- Preceded by: Melina Mercouri
- Succeeded by: Stavros Benos

Deputy Minister for Culture
- In office 13 October 1993 – 16 March 1994

Athanasios "Thanos" Mikroutsikos (Greek: Αθανάσιος (Θάνος) Μικρούτσικος; 13 April 1947 – 28 December 2019) was a Greek composer and politician. He is considered one of the most important composers of the recent Greek musical scene.

== Biography ==
=== Personal life ===
He was born on 13 April 1947 in Patras. He was the older brother of Andreas Mikroutsikos, who is also a musician/composer and a television show host. His wife was children's author Maria Papagianni, whom he married in 1996. He died on 28 December 2019, after a long fight with cancer, at age 72.

=== Music ===
He studied piano and composition in the Philharmonic Society of Patras, in the Hellenic Conservatory, and privately with Yiannis Papaioannou. In addition, he studied Mathematics in the National and Kapodistrian University of Athens. He began composing at the end of the 1960s but only officially debuted in 1975, with the release of his album Politika Tragoudia ('Political Songs'). He continued on this compositional path, setting to music the poems of Giannis Ritsos, Vladimir Mayakovsky, Manos Eleftheriou and Bertold Brecht, amongst others.

His albums Kantata gia ti Makroniso (Cantata for Makronisos), Fouente Ovehouna (Fuenteovejuna), Troparia gia Foniades (Hymns for Murderers) and Mousiki Praxi Ston Brecht (Musical Practice on Brecht) are characteristic of the climate of Metapolitefsi or Regime Change that was taking place in the period 1975–78. In particular, the Cantata for Makronisos, a pioneering piece in which Mikroutsikos experimented with atonality was extremely well received in international music festivals and an interpretation of particular note was recorded by Maria Dimitriadi.

His next album, Stavros tou Notou (Southern Cross), set to the poetry of Nikos Kavvadias, opened up further musical avenues for him, combining theatre, electronic music and atonality (a second album, Grammes ton orizondon, set to the poetry of Kavvadias was released in 1991). With the same devotion to poetry, he continued to set the works of Giannis Ritsos, Alkis Alkaios, François Villon and Constantine P. Cavafy, amongst others. In addition, he has written an opera, Eleni (Helen) and set to music several children's fairytales.

He has worked with many renowned singers such as Maria Dimitriadi, Haris Alexiou, Manolis Mitsias, Dimitris Mitropanos, George Dalaras, Vasilis Papakonstantinou, Christos Thibaios, Miltiadis Paschalidis, Rita Antonopoulou and Giannis Koutras, amongst others. His music has been particularly well received and recognised in Western Europe. During his compositional career, he has managed to liberate the form of Greek song, adding together elements from the modernist and classical western tradition. He also experimented with the combination of tonal and atonal sounds and with morphological variation.

He was artistic director of the New Music Society and the Musical Analogion, whilst he also worked with and directed the Patras International Festival.

=== Politics ===
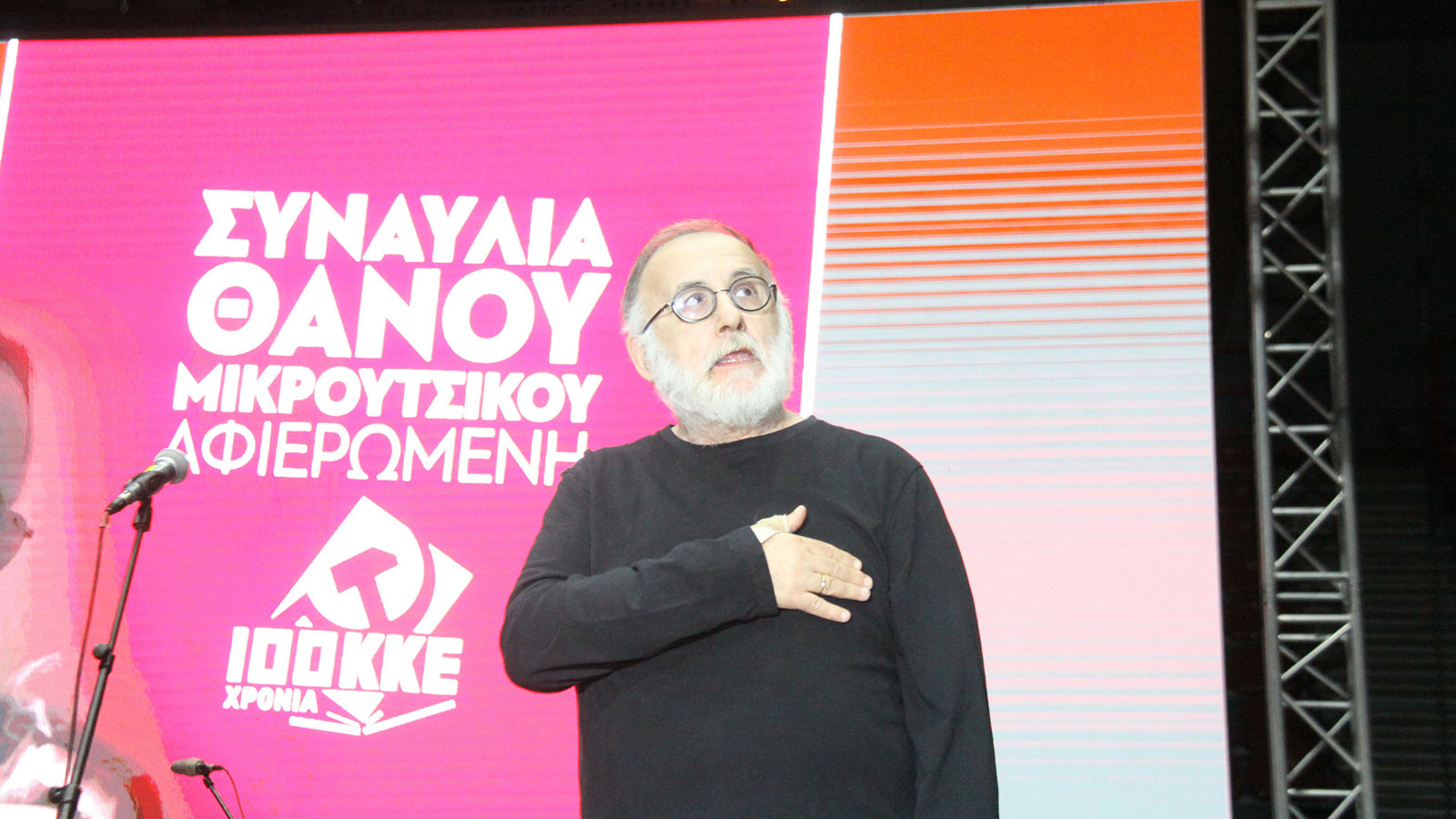
Thanos Mikroutsikos

He was involved in Greece's political life since the 1960s. During the turbulent years of the Greek military junta of 1967–1974, he was persecuted by the regime for his anti-dictatorial activities and ideas. When the junta collapsed, he continued being actively involved in politics as a member of the maoist EKKE, especially in the first years after the restoration of democracy.

After the elections of October 1993, he was appointed as Deputy Minister of Culture by the new Panhellenic Socialist Movement (PASOK) government, serving alongside the late Melina Mercouri who was Minister of Culture. He was appointed to position when she died in 1994, a position he kept until 1996.

He was a supporter of the Communist Party of Greece.

== Works (selection) ==
- Musical Act for Brecht for two male voices, two clarinets and a piano (text: Bertolt Brecht), 1972–78
- Cantata for Makronisos for female and male voice, small orchestra and tape (text: Υannis Ritsos), 1976–82
- Study for Vladimir Mayakovsky for voice and small orchestra (text: Vladimir Mayakovsky), 1976–82
- Euripides IV for narrator, soprano, mezzo, tenor, baritone, bassoon, trumpet, horn and piano (text: Euripides), 1979
- The Moonlight Sonata for voice and piano (text: Υannis Ritsos), 1979–81
- Preludes for guitar, 1981
- The Old Man of Alexandria, song cycle for voice, mandolin and piano (text: Konstantinos Kavafis), 1982
- Opera for One (flutist) for flute, 1983–84
- Duo for alto saxophone and electric bass, 1985
- The Sea for string orchestra and trumpet, 1991
- The Return of Helen, opera in one act in six movements based on a libretto by Christos Lambrakis (with poems by Yannis Ritsos) for nine voices, mixed choir, orchestra and a trio, 1992–93
- Return to the Future 1 for clarinet and marimba, 2003
- The sea smiles from over there for mezzo and string quartet (text: Federico García Lorca), 2009

== Discography ==
Albums
Year	Greek Title	Transliteration	Translation	Label
1972	Είμαστε κάτι ξεχαρβαλωμένες κιθάρες / Οι Δων Κιχώτες	Eimaste kati xecharvalomenes kithares / Oi Don Kichotes	We are rickety guitars / The Don Quixotes	Minos
1975	Πολιτικά τραγούδια	Politika tragoudia	Political songs	Lyra
1976	Καντάτα για την Μακρόνησο	Kantata gia tin Makroniso	Cantata for Makronisos	Lyra
1976	Σπουδή σε ποιήματα του Βλαδίμηρου Μαγιακόβσκη	Spoudi se poiimata tou Vladimirou Magiakovski	Study on the poems of Vladimir Mayakovsky	Lyra
1977	Φουέντε Οβεχούνα	Fouente Ovechouna	Fuenteovejuna	Lyra
1977	Τροπάρια για φονιάδες	Troparia gia foniades	Hymns for murderers	Lyra
1978	Τραγούδια της λευτεριάς	Tragoudia tis lefterias	Songs of freedom	Lyra
1978	Μουσική πράξη στον Μπέρτολτ Μπρέχτ	Mousiki praxi ston Bertolt Brecht	Musical practice on Bertolt Brecht	Lyra
1979	Ο σταυρός του νότου	O stavros tou notou	The Southern Cross	Lyra
1980	Ευριπίδης IV	Evripidis IV	Euripides IV	Lyra
1981	Λεοντής-Μικρούτσικος: Συναυλίες 81	Leondis-Mikroutsikos: Σynavlies 81	Leondis-Mikroutsikos: Concerts 81	CBS
1982	Εμπάργκο	Empargko	Embargo	CBS
1983	Ιχνογραφία – Ο γέρος της Αλεξάνδρειας	Ichnografia – O geros tis Alexandreias	Sketch - The old man from Alexandria	CBS
1983	Αραπιά για λίγο πάψε να χτυπάς με το σπαθί	Arapia gia ligo papse na chtypas me to spathi	Arab lands stop hitting with your sword for a while	CBS
1984	Βίκτωρ-Βικτωρία	Victor-Victoria	Victor/Victoria	CBS
1985	Αντιθέσεις	Anditheseis	Contrasts	ΕΤ.ΝΕ.Μ.
1985	Ντούο για άλτο σαξόφωνο και ηλεκτρικό μπάσο	Douo gia alto saxofono kai ilektriko baso	Duet for alto saxophone and electric bass	ΕΤ.ΝΕ.Μ.
1986	Η αγάπη είναι ζάλη	I agapi einai zali	Love is dizzy	Μinos
1987	Στον Μάνο Λοϊζο-Νύχτα με σκιές χρωματιστές	Ston Mano Loizo-Nychta me skies chromatistes	(Dedication) To Manos Loizos-Night with coloured shadows	Μinos
1988	Όλα από χέρι καμένα	Ola apo cheri kamena	All from a burnt hand	Μinos
1989	Ελλάς κατόπιν αορτής	Ellas katopin aortis	Greece after an aneurysm	CBS
1989	Όσο κρατάει ένας καφές	Oso krataei enas kafes	As long as a coffee lasts	Minos
1990	Για πιάνο και φωνή	Gia piano kai foni	For piano and voice	Minos
1990	Κρατάει χρόνια αυτή η κολώνια	Krataei chronia afti i kolonia	This cologne lasts for years	Minos
1991	Γραμμές των οριζόντων	Grammes ton orizondon	Lines of the horizon	Minos
1992	Συγνώμη για την άμυνα	Sygnomi gia tin amyna	Sorry for the defence	Minos
1992	Music for Two			Minos
1994	Volpe d'amore			EMI
1996	Τα παραμύθια της γαλάζιας γραμμής	Ta paramythia tis galazias grammis	The fairytales of the blue line	Minos
1996	Στου αιώνα την παράγκα	Stou aiona tin paragka	In the shanty house of the century	Minos
1997	Ποίηση με μουσική	Poiisi me mousiki	Poetry with music	EMI
1997	Η ιστορία της Λούλου	I istoria tis Loulou	The story of Lulu	EMI
1997	Ψάξε στ'όνειρο μας	Psaxe st'oneiro mas	Search in our dreams	Minos
1998	Στην αγκαλιά της άκρης	Stin agkalia tis akris	In the embrace of the edge	EMI
1998	Ο Θάνος Μικρούτσικος τραγουδά Θάνο Μικρούτσικο	O Thanos Mikroutsikos tragouda Thano Mikroutsiko	Thanos Mikroutsikos sings Thanos Mikroutsiko	EMI
1998	For sax and strings and love and dreams			Agora
1998	Slow motion			EMI
1999	The return of Helen			EMI
1999	Θάλασσα στη σκάλα	Thalassa sti skala	Sea on the stairs	Minos
2000	Σφεντόνα Live	Sfendona Live	Slingshot Live	
2000	Ο Θάνος Μικρούτσικος στη Λύρα	O Thanos Mikroutsikos sti Lyra	Thanos Mikroutsikos at Lyra	
2000	Live Στη Σφεντόνα	Live Sti Sfendona	Live at Slingshot	Minos/EMI
2001	Του Απείρου Εραστής	Tou Apeirou Erastis	Lover of infinity	
2001	Dance and Memories			EMI Classics
2001	Οι Κυρίες Του Θάνου Μικρούτσικου	Oi Kyries Tou Thanou Mikroutsikou	Thanos Mikroutsikos's ladies	Minos/EMI
2001	Στον Τόπο Μου Είμαι Τέλεια Ξένος	Ston Topo Mou Eimai Teleia Xenos	I am a perfect stranger in my place	Minos/EMI
2002	Αυτά Που Τραγουδήσαμε	Afta Pou Tragoudisame	Those (songs) which we sang	Minos/EMI
2002	Ολα Τα Πρόσωπα	Ola Ta Prosopa	All the people	Minos/EMI
2002	Ο Άμλετ Της Σελήνης	O Amlet Tis Selinis	Hamlet of the moon	Minos/EMI
2004	Σχοινοβάτης	Schoinovatis	Tightrope walker	Minos/EMI
2006	Υπέροχα Μονάχοι	Yperocha Monachoi	Perfectly alone	Legend
2007	Παράξενο δεν είναι;	Paraxeno den einai?	Isn't it weird?	
2009	Επέστρεφε (Καβάφης)	Epestrefe (Kavafis)	He came back (Cavafy)	
2009	Τους Έχω Βαρεθεί / Θάνος Μικρούτσικος Σε Συνεργασία με τα Υπόγεια Ρεύματα	Tous Echo Varethei/ Thanos Mikroutsikos Se Synergasia me ta Ypogeia Revmata	I am bored of them / Thanos Mikroutsikos in collaboration with undercurrents	Legend

Political offices
Preceded by Melina Mercouri	Minister for Culture of Greece; 1994–1996	Succeeded by Stavros Benos
