= Francesco Vitali =

American film producer

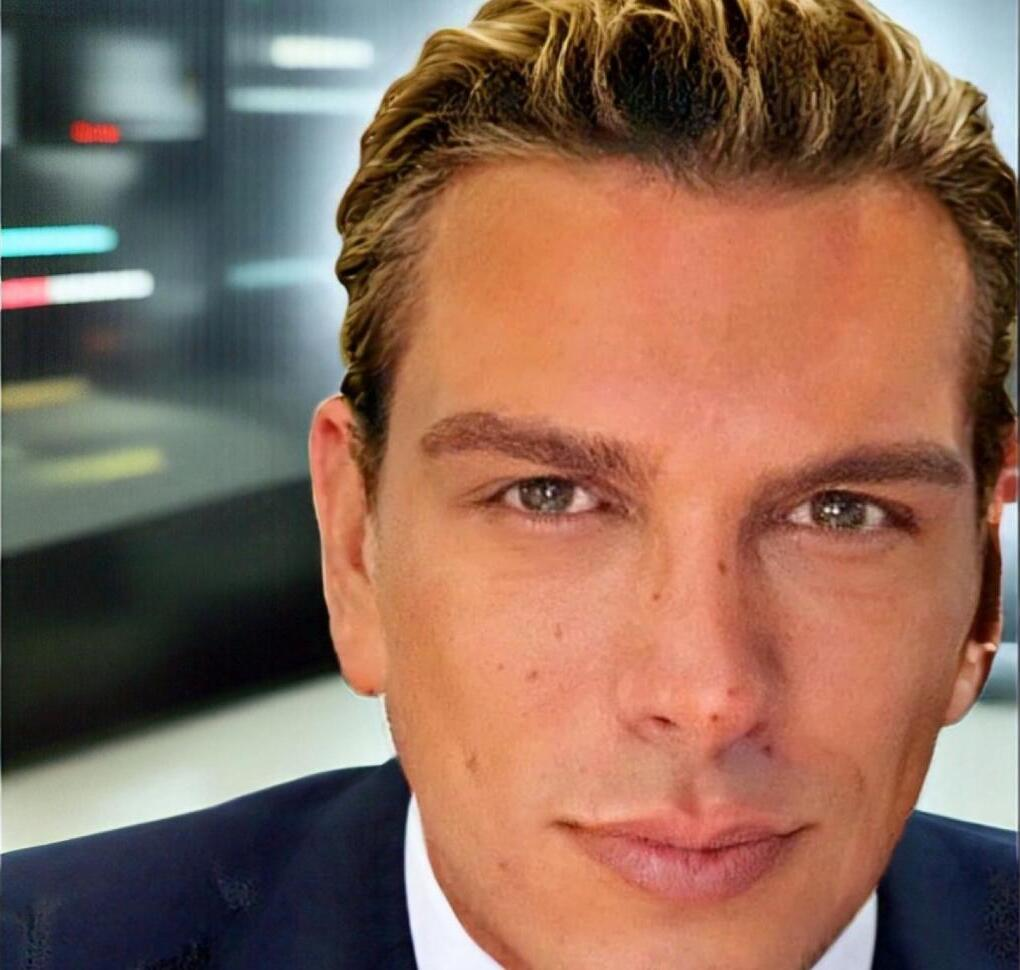
- Francesco Vitali (2025)
- Born: Francesco (Fragiskos)Vitali; January 20, 1976 (age 50); Athens, Greece
- Occupations: Business advisor and strategist
- Known for: Founder and CEO of RentACyberFriend.com; Co-founder of 48FILM Project
- Notable work: Message for Success (2023)
- Website: www.vitaliadvice.com

Francesco Vitali (born Fragiskos Vitali; 20 January 1976) is a Greek-American business advisor, branding strategist, and entrepreneur based in Los Angeles. He is known for co-founding and managing the international short-film competition 48FILM Project, as well as co-founding Rent A Cyber Friend, a digital platform focused on real-time human-to-human interaction.

== Biography ==
Francesco Vitali was born in Athens and raised in Piraeus. His father's family came from Italy. He began his career in journalism, eventually becoming Editor-in-Chief for the Greek editions of several international publications. He also founded a talent management company in Greece, before moving to New York City in 1996.

After relocating to Los Angeles, Vitali became the Artistic Director of the Tamarind Theater in Hollywood, where he directed and starred in several productions, including Hamlet and Harold Pinter's Ashes to Ashes under the direction of Di Trevis. During this time, he was cast in the HBO series Unscripted, appearing in episodes 1.3 and 1.4. In 2004, Vitali left acting for entrepreneurship and production.

In 2008, Vitali co-founded the online film festival 48 Go Green with Chris Siametis. Initially launched in Cyprus, the project attracted over 300 entries within its first month. It later evolved into the 48FILM Project, a global competition where filmmakers create short films in just 48 hours.

This expanded into the 48 Music Project, where musicians composed and submitted original songs in 48 hours. The project was endorsed by Sony Music and featured composer Dimitra Galani as jury president. By 2016, over 75,000 filmmakers from 130 countries had participated in the 48FILM Project. Finalist films were screened at the Directors Guild of America.

He also announced the production of Gates of Hades (2018), a psychological thriller inspired by the myth of Persephone.

Since the early 2000s, Vitali has worked in business strategy and brand development, advising entertainers, entrepreneurs, and companies in Europe and the United States on publicity, market positioning, and communications strategy. According to Vitali, clients have included Ivana Trump. In 2023, Vitali released Message for Success, a motivational business book.

Vitali is also the co-founder and Chief Executive Officer of Rent A Cyber Friend, an online platform where users pay by the minute for real-time video conversations with independent “cyber friends.” The service was presented at TechCrunch Disrupt’s Startup Battlefield.
