= 48FILM Project =

48FILM
- Location: Los Angeles
- Founded: 2009
- Website: https://www.48filmproject.com/

48FILM is an international short film festival and online competition founded in 2009. The competition is open from January to November each year. Professional and amateur filmmakers worldwide are given 48 hours to write, film, edit, produce and upload a short 4-9 minute movie. The competitors' works are judged by a jury of renowned film personalities, and the films of 15 finalists are screened at the Directors Guild of America (DGA) in Los Angeles, where the grand winner receives the prize of $10,000. More than 90,000 filmmakers from 130 countries actively participated in the festival by 2016.

== History ==
Francesco Vitali and Chris Siametis started a film festival in Greece in 2009. Originally it was a film competition only for Greek nationals to create a short film in 48 hours. 48 hour Go Green Athens was a success, and the income from the screening was given to the World Wide Fund for Nature (WWF). The winner's film was screened at Cannes. To be able to found an international festival, they moved to Cyprus, set up an online company and made an online film festival. Within 20 days, they had 330 entries from all over the world. Online events were held concurrently with live events in 10 major cities in the United States. The top 15 winning films were shown in the Short Film Corner at Cannes and NAB Show in Las Vegas. Deciding to increase the scope of the festival, they moved to the United States.

It was in Los Angeles that Vitali as executive producer and Siametis as co-executive producer, together with a team of filmmakers, writers, producers, cinematographers, directors and actors, created an online festival for short films and called it 48FILM Project. In the first few years of the competition, the films of 15 finalists were screened at the Cannes Film Festival. In 2013, the finalists' films were screened at the Academy of Motion Picture Arts and Sciences' Samuel Goldwyn Theater in Beverly Hills. For the last five years, they have been screened at the Directors Guild of America.

For the first time in 2014, 48FILM Project provided a budget of $48,000 for an additional prize. It was given to the best producer, best director and best writer to join forces and shoot a feature film in Hollywood in 2015. In the same year, the competition was accompanied by 48 Music Project, where musicians from all over the world had to create an original song within 48 hours. The prize was a contract with a major record company in Los Angeles plus $10,000 in cash and prizes. Moreover, the 15 finalists performed in front of a music-industry audience in Hollywood.

More than 90,000 filmmakers from 130 countries actively participated in the 48FILM Project festival by 2016.

In 2017, Vitali and Siametis started 48Film Project Hellas 2017 - Respect Greece, a festival aimed at Greek and Cypriot filmmakers, artists, directors and producers. The 30 finalists are slated to have their films screened in Los Angeles and to compete for the grand prize of $5,000. It was announced that footage from the films would be used to rebrand Greece in the documentary Respect Greece, presenting Greek culture to the world.

== Rules ==
The competition is open to anyone with an internet connection, regardless of whether they are professionals or amateurs. The competitors keep the rights to their films and choose whatever genre they want. Everyone is eligible to enter at any point from January to November each year, as many times as they like. However, once a filmmaker has applied online, he or she has two days (48 hours) to imagine a story, shoot and edit the film. They are given additional two hours to upload it to the festival site. When filmmakers submit their application, they are informed about the three elements that their film must contain to prove that it was really made in 48 hours: a character, a prop, and a line of dialog. For example, the 2016 winner Clara was required to include a character named James, a perfume bottle, and the question "Is that a dagger which I see before me?".

Films are judged by a jury of renowned film personalities in December each year. The 15 finalists are announced in January. The first prize of $10,000 is awarded at the Directors Guild of America (DGA) in Los Angeles in February or March. The top 15 films are screened at DGA before an audience of prominent producers, directors, agents, managers and industry professionals.

48FILM phase out during the pandemic and is going back at the Directors Guild of America the spring of 2021.

== Awards ==
These are all the winners of 48FILM Project.

=== 2011 Winner ===
| Award | Winner |
|---|---|
| Best Film | Charlie, the Man Who Brought Back the Sea |

=== 2012 Winners ===
| Award | Winner |
|---|---|
| Best Film | Happy Days |
| People's Choice | A Place to Love |
| Runner Up Best Film | The Other Half |
| 2nd Runner Up Best Film | We Are Natural Superheroes |

=== 2013 Winners ===
| Award | Winner |
|---|---|
| Best Film | Unspoken |
| Runner Up Best Film | Trunk Space |
| 2nd Runner Up Best Film | An Uncomfortable Truth |
| People's Choice Award | Working Class Hero |
| Best Directing | Tom Ruddock, Unspoken |
| Best Actor | Gianvincenzo Pugliese, Working Class Hero |
| Best Actress | Justine Priestley, Unspoken |
| Best Screenplay | Riccardo Toppan, Manuel Giordano, Marta Lombardelli, Working Class Hero |
| Best Production | Jonathan and Olivia Flint, The Space Between |
| Best Cinematography | Michael Head, Trunk Space |
| Best Music | Michael Head, Trunk Space |

=== 2014 Winners ===
| Award | Winner |
|---|---|
| Best Film | The Deal |
| Runner Up Best Film | Unkillable |
| 2nd Runner Up Best Film | Kidnapping |
| People's Choice Award | Hiccups |
| People's Choice Award | Missing Memories |
| Best Director | Chris Cronin, Unkillable |
| Best Actor | Sal Hernandez, The Deal |
| Best Actress | Júlia Creus, In the Box |
| Best Actress | Fiamma Bennet, Kidnapping |
| Best Writer | Sal Hernandez, Pablo Schmitt, The Deal |
| Best Producer | Vassili Rouan, Kidnapping |
| Best Cinematographer | Alex Stone, Unkillable |
| Best Editor | Michael Lubin, Hiccups |
| Best Editor | Aaron Morga, The Malignant 8 |

=== 2015 Winners ===
| Award | Winner |
|---|---|
| Best Film | Clara |
| Runner Up Best Film | Metaception |
| 2nd Runner Up Best Film | Safe |
| People's Choice Award | Safe |
| Best Director | Marco Santi, Clara |
| Best Actor | Delivery Hummingbird, After |
| Best Actress | Francesca Napoli, Clara |
| Best Writer | Lucio Lepri, Andrea Piezzo, Esse Est Percipi |
| Best Production | Marco Santi, Greta Biffarino, Clara |
| Best Cinematographer | Lucio Lepri, Esse Est Percipi |
| Best Editor | Marco Santi, Clara |
| Best Original Music | Stefano Milella, Clara |

=== 2016 Winners ===
| Award | Winner |
|---|---|
| Best Film | Choke |
| People's Choice Award | The Nursery |
| Best Directing | Nancy Paton, Choke |
| Best Actor in a Leading Role | Oliver Price, The Wanderer |
| Best Actress in a Leading Role | Shannon Beeby, Apples |
| Best Actor in a Supporting Role | Tyler Derench, A Night at Cagney's |
| Best Actress in a Supporting Role | Julia Robert, Victoire |
| Best Writing | Zachary Byer, Nick Byer, Gus Langley, Morning Wood |
| Best Editing | Gergana D. Angelova, Insight |
| Best Cinematography | Liam Iandoli, Choke |
| Best Music (Original Score) | Matthew Morgan, Victoire |
