= Antonios Katinaris =

Greek musician

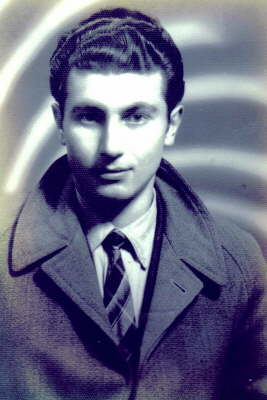
Antonios Katinaris

Antonios Katinaris (Greek: Αντώνιος Κατινάρης; 1931 – 28 October 1999) was a Greek musician.

== Biography ==
He was born in Chania, Crete, the first son of a refugee family from Asia Minor. Since his earliest years, he demonstrated his interest and his talent in music. He was already a music professional at the age of 16. His virtuoso bouzouki-playing made him famous on the popular music stages of Chania.

He went to Athens in the 1960s, where he made his big break into the Greek popular musical scene as a composer. The song What can you do, with only one heart (Greek: Τί να σου Κάνει μια Καρδιά), with lyrics by Eftychia Papagianopoulou, marked the start of his national career.

Katinaris was married to Maria Rippi, herself a singer and member of a famous family of musicians. He has three daughters, from whom one, Maria Katinari, is continuing his music work as a singer and songwriter.

He died in 1999 in Athens.

== Discography ==
- 12 Fylla tis Kardias, (Greek: 12 Φύλλα της Καρδιάς), Columbia, 1971
- Palia Merakia, (Παλιά Μεράκια), Columbia, 1973
- Baglamades, (Μπαγλαμάδες), Columbia, 1973
- Asta na pane, (Αστα να Πάνε), Columbia, 1974
- Neotera ki Anotera, (Νεώτερα κι Ανώτερα), Columbia, 1974
- Synanastrofes, (Συναναστροφές), Columbia, 1974
- Aftapates, (Αυταπάτες), Columbia, 1975
- Bouzoukokelaidismata, (Μπουζουκοκελαϊδίσματα ), Polyphone 1978
- Akou ti tha po, (Άκου Τι Θα Πω), Relans, 1982
- 12 Epityxies (12 Επιτυχίες), Relans, 1982
- Laiko Palko (Λαϊκό Πάλκο), Polyphone, 1987
- Gia sas ta Dialeksa, (Για σας τα Διάλεξα) WEA, 1994
