= Loukianos Kilaidonis =

Greek composer, songwriter, and singer (1943-2017)

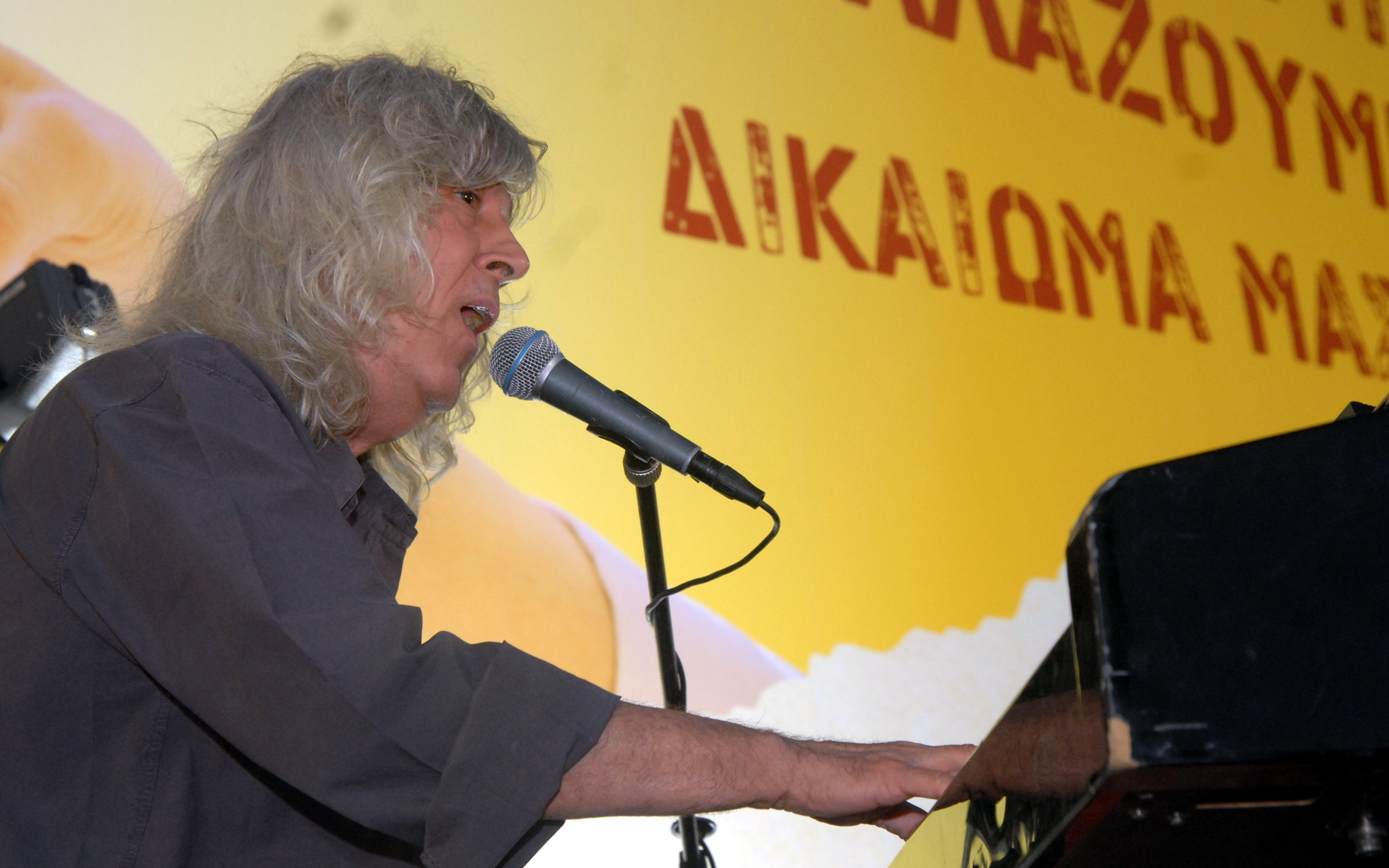
- Loukianos Kilaidonis sings at a Syriza festival in Kotzia Square in Athens
- Born: 15 July 1943; Kypseli, Athens, Greece
- Died: 7 February 2017 (aged 73); Marousi, Greece
- Citizenship: Greek
- Occupations: composer, versifier, singer
- Known for: contemporary folk, lightfolk and ragtime music
- Notable work: Our city (1970), Party in Vouliagmeni (1983)

Loukianos Kilaidonis (Greek: Λουκιανός Κηλαηδόνης; 15 July 1943 – 7 February 2017) was a Greek composer, songwriter and singer.

== Biography ==
Kilaidonis was born at Kypseli, Athens. He studied at the Lycée Léonin of Patissia. He then studied architecture at the Aristotle University of Thessaloniki for 2 years and afterwards returned to Athens where he finished his studies at the National Technical University of Athens. He never did work in architecture because he started a career in music. His first work was the album Our city in 1970. Two years later he made the album Red Thread with Nikos Gatsos and the singers Manolis Mitsias and Dimitra Galani.

== The Party in Vouliagmeni ==
Kilaidonis organized a large scale concert, the Party in Vouliagmeni, which took place on 25 July 1983, gathering over 70000 people (other estimates place the number at 100000). Also appearing at the Party were Dionysis Savvopoulos, Margarita Zorbala, Vangelis Germanos, George Dalaras, Aphrodite Manou and Mando, reaching the floating stage by speedboats. At a time when the term beach party wasn't particularly well known in Greece, this beach concert managed to cause congestion from Vouliagmeni up to Syngrou Avenue and is considered to be the Greek Woodstock.

== Death ==
Kilaidonis died in hospital on 7 February 2017 due to either heart disease or heart failure resulting from a respiratory infection. He was 74.
