= Rita Sakellariou =

Greek singer (1934–1999)

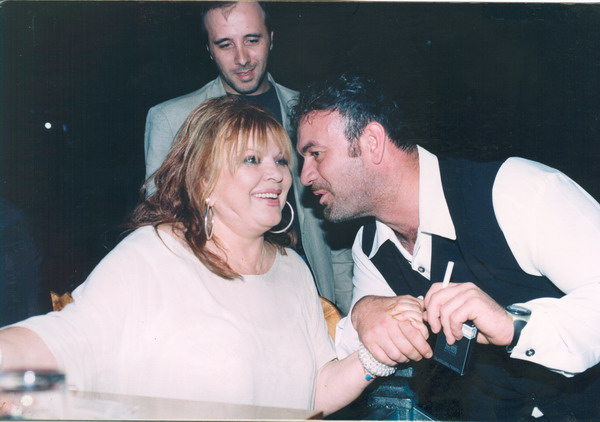
- Sakellariou in 1998

Background information
- Born: Margarita Sakellariou; 22 October 1934; Sitia, Greece
- Died: 6 August 1999 (aged 64) Athens, Greece
- Genres: Laïko
- Occupation: Singer
- Years active: 1959–1999

Rita Sakellariou (Greek: Ρίτα Σακελλαρίου; 22 October 1934 – 6 August 1999) was a Greek singer in the laïko tradition.

== Biography ==
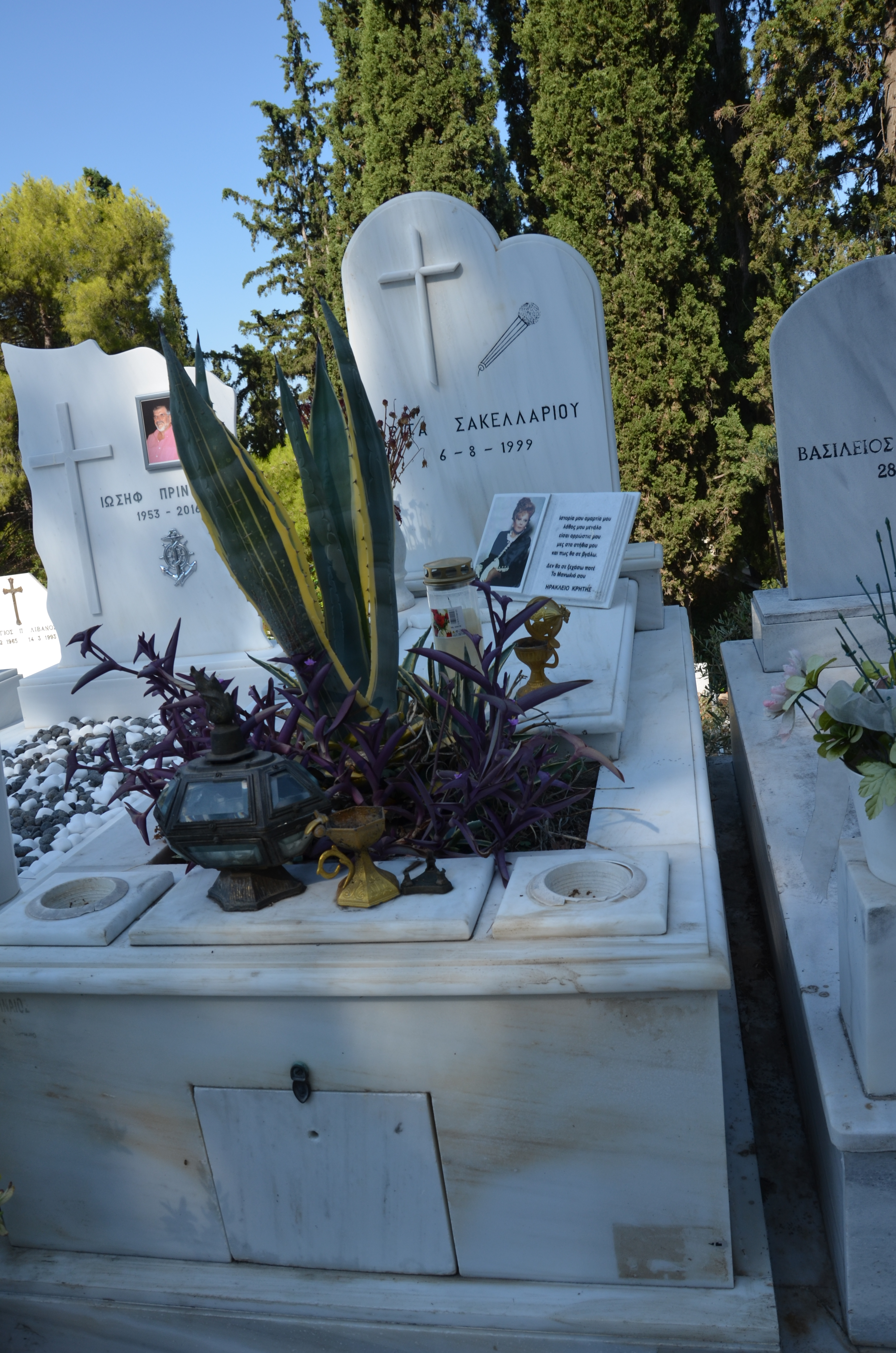
Sakellariou's gravestone in the First Cemetery of Athens

Sakellariou was born on 22 October 1934 in Chamezi, a village near Sitia on the Greek island of Crete. Her father was a shoemaker from the island of Kalymnos; her mother's family were refugees from Smyrna. Sakellariou, the eldest of three children, was given the name Margarita after her paternal grandmother. The family moved to Piraeus when Sakellariou was a small child. Her father lost his life in the 1946-49 civil war and the family were left destitute. Sakellariou left school aged twelve and helped the family's finances by selling bread and lemons from a barrow in the streets of Piraeus. Marriage at the age of fourteen provided her with an escape but the marriage did not last and she worked in factories to support her son and daughter. Musically untrained, but with a "inimitable voice endowed with emotion", she started singing in tavernes in Piraeus where Rebetiko music was performed.

An introduction to the composer and bouzuki player Vassilis Tsitsanis led to an eight-year collaboration and established her as a singer in the Laïko tradition of urban folk music. She also appeared in several Greek films in the 1960s. She recorded her first solo album, Kathe Iliovasilema (Every Sunset) in 1970, and her greatest success came with her third album Istoria Mou (My Story) in 1972. In 1969, while singing in Thessaloniki, Sakellariou met wrestler Stefanos Sidiropoulos. The couple married a year later and had three sons. Sakellariou and her husband opened a nightclub, the Queen Ann, on the National Road out of Athens. It was patronised by Greek and foreign political figures and celebrities. Among them were American vice-president Spiro Agnew, American actor Anthony Quinn, Greek shipping magnate Aristotle Onassis and Greek singer Melina Mercouri. Greek politician Andreas Papandreou was a particular admirer of Sakellariou's music and would dance the Zeibekiko when she sang "Aftos o Anthropos, aftos" ("This Man") at his Name day celebrations.

Sakellariou was at the height of her fame in the 1970s, when she had a string of hits including "Istoria mou, Amartia mou" ("My story, my Sin") and "Oi Andres kai oi Handres" ("Men and Beads"). Her classic song "Istoria mou, Amartia mou" can be heard playing on a Greek radio station during a scene in the 1973 film The Exorcist. By the end of the 1970s the best years of the Queen Ann nightclub were over, as was Sakellariou's second marriage. Although she found it difficult to keep up with new musical trends in the 1980s and 1990s, she remained a popular figure and produced several albums.

In 1998 Sakellariou was diagnosed with pancreatic cancer. After undergoing treatment she went on a tour in Australia, which she had to abandon after three performances. On her return to Athens, she was admitted to the Ygeia Hospital, where she died on 6 August 1999.
