= Yiannis Ritsos =

Greek poet and communist (1909–1990)

- Γιάννης Ρίτσος
- Born: 1 May 1909; Monemvasia, Greece
- Died: 11 November 1990 (aged 81); Athens, Greece
- Occupation: Poet
- Writing career
- Notable awards: Lenin Peace Prize; 1975
- Movements: Modernism; Generation of the '30s

Yiannis Ritsos (Greek: Γιάννης Ρίτσος [ˈritsos]; 1 May 1909 – 11 November 1990) was a Greek poet and communist and an active member of the Greek Resistance during World War II. While he disliked being regarded as a political poet, he has been called "the great poet of the Greek left".

== Early life ==
Ritsos was born on 1 May 1909 to a well-to-do landowning family in Monemvasia. He suffered great losses as a child: his mother and eldest brother died early from tuberculosis, his father struggled with mental illness, and his family was economically ruined. This marked Ritsos and affected his poetry. Ritsos himself was confined in a sanatorium for tuberculosis from 1927 to 1931.

== Literary start ==
In 1934, Ritsos joined the Communist Party of Greece (KKE). He maintained a working-class circle of friends and published Tractor in 1934. Kostis Palamas, the well known and respected poet, impressed by his talent, praised him publicly.

In 1935, he published Pyramids; these two works sought to achieve a fragile balance between faith in the future, founded on the Communist ideal, and personal despair. Tractors and Pyramids initially were not well received by leftist critics, who found the language "too embellished" and Ritsos overly focused on form.

He was inspired for his landmark poem "Epitaphios" by a photo of a dead protester during a massive tobacco-workers demonstration in Thessaloniki in May 1936. Published the same year, it broke with the shape of the Greek traditional popular poetry and expressed in clear and simple language a message of the unity of all people.

== Political upheaval and the poet ==
In August 1936, the right-wing dictatorship of Ioannis Metaxas came to power and Epitaphios was burned publicly at the foot of the Acropolis in Athens. Ritsos responded by taking his work in a different direction. He began to explore the conquests of surrealism through the domain of dreams, surprising associations, explosions of images and symbols, a lyricism illustrative of the anguish of the poet, and both tender and bitter souvenirs. During this period Ritsos published The Song of my Sister (1937) and Symphony of the Spring (1938).

== Axis occupation, Civil War and the Junta ==
During the Axis occupation of Greece (1941–1945) Ritsos became a member of the EAM (National Liberation Front) and authored several poems for the Greek Resistance. These include a booklet of poems dedicated to the resistance leader Aris Velouchiotis, written immediately upon the latter's death on 16 June 1945. Ritsos also supported the Left in the subsequent Civil War (1946–1949); in 1948 he was arrested and spent four years in prison camps. In the 1950s Epitaphios, set to music by Mikis Theodorakis, became the anthem of the Greek Left.

In 1967 he was arrested by the Papadopoulos dictatorship and sent to a prison camp in Gyaros, later to Samos and finally Lemnos.

== Legacy ==
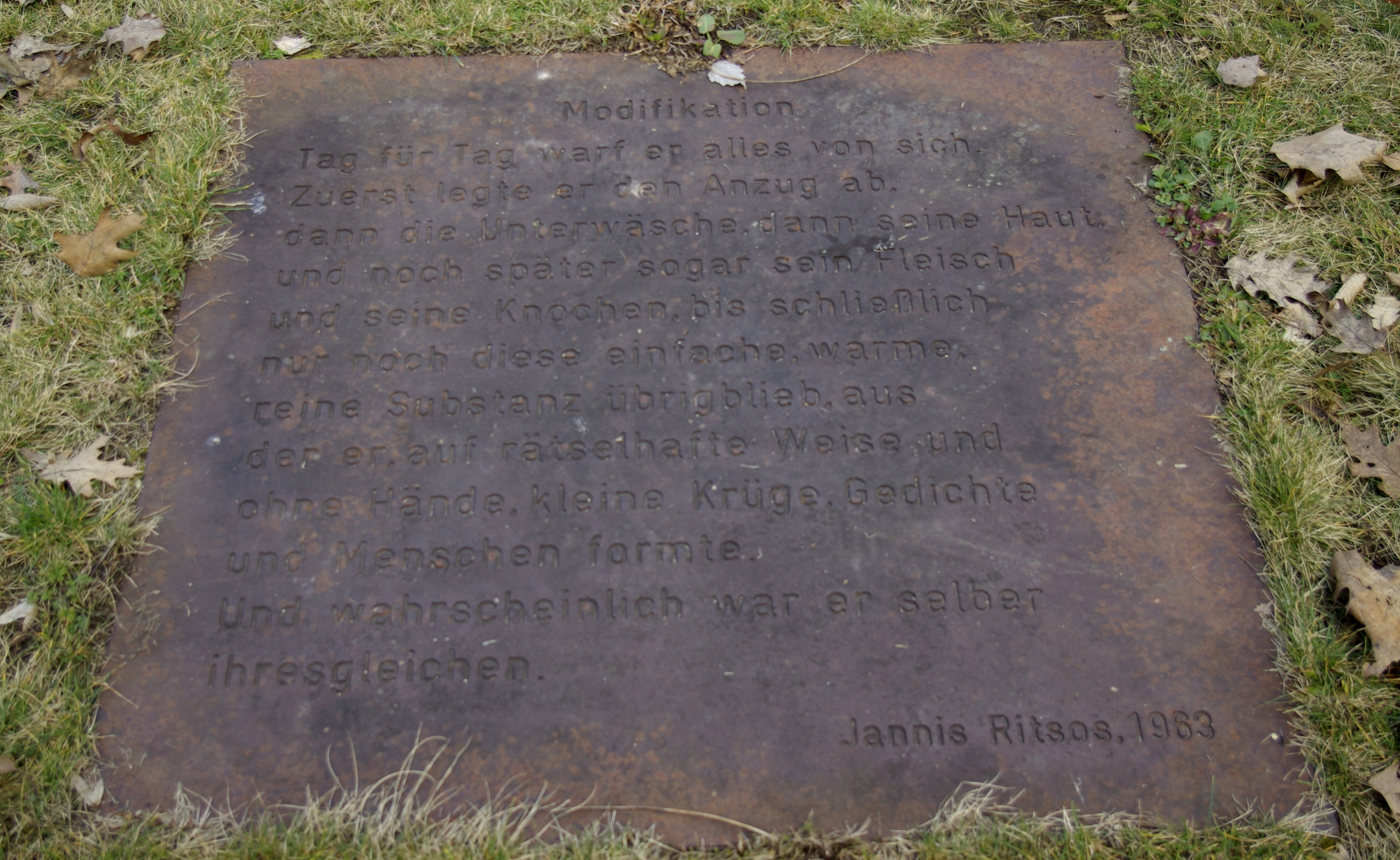
Sculpture "Prisoner Stones 1" (1974) by Hans-Jürgen Breuste in Erlangen. Featuring a Yannis Ritsos poem.

Today, Ritsos is considered one of the great Greek poets of the twentieth century, alongside Konstantinos Kavafis, Kostas Kariotakis, Angelos Sikelianos, Giorgos Seferis, and Odysseas Elytis. The French poet Louis Aragon once said that Ritsos was "the greatest poet of our age." Pablo Neruda declared him to be more deserving of the Nobel Prize for Literature than himself. Ritsos was proposed several times for it, and was shortlisted as one of the final candidates at least once, in 1973. When he won the Lenin Peace Prize in 1975, he declared "this prize is more important for me than the Nobel."

His poetry was banned at times in Greece due to his left wing beliefs.

Notable works by Ritsos include Pyramids (1935), Epitaphios (1936; second edition, 1956), Vigil (1941–1953), Romiosini (1954) and 18 short songs of the bitter Motherland (18 λιανοτράγουδα της πικρής πατρίδας/18 Lianotragouda Tis Pikris Patridas) (1973). Stratis Haviaras also praised two poems (the one about Jesus and the one about Karl Marx) in his first collection Tractor (1934). Robert Shannan Peckham described him as "perhaps Greece's greatest contemporary poet." Epitaphios became an anthem of the Greek left in the 1950s, and his best-known work.

Ritsos won the first Greek state poetry award for Moonlight Sonata:

I know that each one of us travels to love alone,
alone to faith and to death.
I know it. I've tried it. It doesn't help.
Let me come with you.

— Moonlight Sonata. Translation by Peter Green and Beverly Bardsley

Some offer more measured praise. In a review of Selected Poems: 1938-1988, James Erdman argued,

To my ear, many of these selections are simply short prose works, lacking the concentration of the best poetry. The pieces of ancient history and mythology from Repetitions such as "The Graves of Our Ancestors," "Alcmene," "Philometa," and "Achilles After Death" seem among the better efforts. [...] he often uses dream imagery, which can be effective in small doses but soon grows monotonous: not all concepts can be expressed in images. [...] But Ritsos is also capable of writing with great power. His best poem is "Romiosini," a lengthy paean to the spirit of the Greek Resistance.

Ted Sampson stated that Louis Aragon's declaration about Ritsos was "hyperbolic", but wrote that the poet still "excelled in brief epigrammatic utterances as well as in extended lyrics, sequences, and verse dramas of astonishing imagistic and thematic originality—to say nothing of their latent emotional intensity".

Ritsos is also a Golden Wreath Laureate of the Struga Poetry Evenings for 1985.

His daughter, Eri, was a candidate for the European Parliament with KKE in the elections of 25 May 2014.

== Translations ==
- Subterranean Horses, tr. Minas Savvas, illustrations by the author (1980)
- Chronicle of Exile, tr. M. Savvas (1977) [select poems]
- Eighteen Short Songs of the Bitter Motherland, tr. A. Mims, illus. Y. Ritsos (1974) [Greek and English]
- Exile and Return, tr. E. Keeley (1985; repr. 1987, 1989) [select poems]
- Gestures and other poems, 1968-1970, tr. N. Stangos, illus. by the poet (1971)
- Repetitions, Testimonies, Parentheses, tr. E. Keeley (1990)
- Selected Poems 1938-1988, tr. K. Friar, K. Myrsiades & others (1989)
- Selected Poems, tr. N. Stangos (1974)
- The Fourth Dimension, tr. P. Green, B. Bardsley (1993)
- Late Into the Night: The Last Poems of Yannis Ritsos, trans. Martin McKinsey (Oberlin College Press, 1995). ISBN 0-932440-71-1
- Diaries of Exile, Archipelago Books, ISBN 978-1-935744-58-0, (2012)
- Petrified Time: Poems from Makrónissos, trans. Martin McKinsey and Scott King (Red Dragonfly Press, 2014). ISBN 978-1937693237.
- Twelve Poems About Cavafy, tr. Paul Merchant (Tavern Books, 2010)
- Monochords, tr. Paul Merchant (Tavern Books, 2017)

== See also ==
- Epitaphios
