= Ygeia Hospital =

Coordinates: 38°01′42″N 23°47′23″E

Ygeia Hospital Νοσοκομείο "Υγεία"

Geography
- Location: Marousi, Attica, Greece

Organisation
- Care system: Publicly funded health care
- Type: Clinical

Services
- Emergency department: Yes

History
- Founded: 1970; 56 years ago

Links
- Lists: Hospitals in Greece

The Ygeia Hospital was founded in 1970 by a group of Greek doctors, with the aim of creating a model for the country of a private hospital.

It is the first large private nursing institution that operated in Greece and is one of the largest private hospital units in the country. In this hospital, Greece performed their first heart transplant and their first treated case of AIDS. They were the first in Europe radioactive granules were implanted in prostate cancer. In May 1989, the hospital successfully separated conjoined twins. In 2013, it was awarded as the best employer in Europe at the European Business Awards 2012/2013.

Ygeia has a range of medical equipment:

- The first PET-CT (Positron Emission Tomography Department) to operate in Greece.
- The only GAMMA-KNIFE Brain Radiosurgery Department in Greece.
- A Da Vinci® S Robotic Surgery system for bloodless operations.
- A Radiotherapy and Oncology Center with modern linear accelerators: ELEKTA Axesse, Synergy, and Platform.
- The Day Treatment Unit (M.H.I.).
- A Fluid Organ Transplantation Units (bone marrow).
