= Grigoris Bithikotsis =

Greek folk singer and songwriter

- Γρηγόρης Μπιθικώτσης
- Born: Grigorios Bithikotsis; 11 December 1922; Peristeri, Athens, Greece
- Died: 7 April 2005 (aged 82); Ygeia Hospital, Athens, Greece
- Occupation: Singer
- Years active: 1949–2002

Grigoris Bithikotsis (Greek: Γρηγόρης Μπιθικώτσης [ɣriˈɣoris biθiˈkot͜sis]; 11 December 1922 – 7 April 2005) was a Greek laiko singer/songwriter with a career spanning five decades. He is considered one of the most important figures in Greek popular music.

== Biography ==
Bithikotsis was born on 11 December 1922 in Peristeri, Athens, to a poor family. He became interested in music at an early age, and acquired a bouzouki as soon as he was able. At first, he had to hide the instrument at a friend's house and practice in secret, as his father disapproved of the new rembetiko style that had captured his son's interest.

He met composer Mikis Theodorakis in 1959 and the two collaborated producing folk songs. Bithikotsis composed over 80 songs, including: Stu Belami to ouzeri and Tou Votanikou o magas. He possessed a rich singing voice with which he performed his own compositions and those of Theodorakis, who frequently chose his friend Grigoris to perform his masterpieces. The two contributed greatly to the then-emerging laika style of Greek music.

A leftist, he was exiled to the island of Makronisos in the 1950s during the reign of King Paul.

Throughout his life, Bithikotsis performed frequent concerts at numerous venues, including one in Athens upon the occasion of his eightieth birthday.

He died following three months of hospitalization at Ygeia Hospital in Athens, on 7 April 2005, at age 82. His funeral was attended by thousands, including representatives of Greek political parties.

== Discography ==
- Epitafios [1960]
- Politeia A [1961]
- To tragoudi tou nekrou aderfou [1962]
- Epifania [1962]
- To Axion Esti [1964]
- Epitafios-Epifania [1964] (with Meri Lida)
- Politeia B [1964]
- Romiosini [1966]
- Na 'tane to '21 [1969]
- 14 Hryses Epityhies N1 (14 Greatest Hits Vol. 1) [1977]
- 14 Hryses Epityhies N2 (14 Greatest Hits Vol. 2) [1977]
- 1950-1962 Compilation
- 1963-1971 Compilation
- 36 Hronia (36 Years)
- Apo tis 45 Strofes No. 4
- Alpha – Omega [1971]
- Chamenes Agapes (Lost Loves) [1977]
- I Ellada tou Grigori (The Greece of Grigoris)
- Episimi Agapimeni (Best Loved Songs)
- Gia panta No. 1 (Forever #1)
- Gia ton Grigori – I Synavlia to Stadio Erininis kai Filias (For Grigoris, in Peace and Friendship Stadium)
- Mazi (with Stelios Kazantzidis)
- Mazi me ton Grigori (Together with Grigoris)
- Megaloprepeia
- Mia gynaika fevgei (A Woman Leaves) [1969]
- Oktovriou 1978/October 1978 - with Mikis Theodorakis [1978]
- O Agnostos Theos (Strange God) [1970]
- Oi Magalyteres Epityhies Tou (His Greatest Hits)
- Ouranio Toxo (Rainbow)
- Prasino fos (Green Light) [1973]
- Sti Megali Leoforo (On the Broad Avenue)
- Stratos Dionysiou/Ta zebekika tou Grigori kai tou Stratou (with Stratos Dionysiou)
- Ta Afthentika No.2 [1984]
- Apo tous thisayrous ton 45 Strofon (with Vicky Moscholiou)
- Tragoudia apo tis 45 Srtrofes
