= Alkistis Protopsalti =

Greek singer

Alkistis Protopsalti Άλκηστις Πρωτοψάλτη
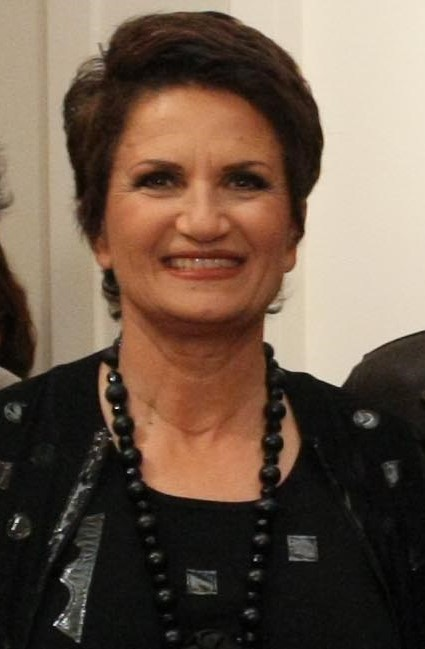

Background information
- Born: Alkistis-Sevasti Attikiouzeloglou; 18 October 1954 (age 72); Alexandria, Egypt
- Origin: Greece
- Genre: Modern entehno
- Occupation: Singer
- Years active: 1975–present
- Website: https://alkistisprotopsalti.gr

Alternate Minister of Tourism
- In office 28 August 2015 – 23 September 2015
- President: Prokopis Pavlopoulos
- Prime Minister: Vassiliki Thanou-Christophilou
- Minister: Nikos Christodoulakis
- Preceded by: Elena Kountoura
- Succeeded by: Elena Kountoura

Alkistis Protopsalti (Greek: Άλκηστις Πρωτοψάλτη), born Alkistis-Sevasti Attikiouzeloglou (Greek: Άλκηστις-Σεβαστή Αττικιουζέλογλου), is a Greek singer.

== Life ==
Alkistis Protopsalti was born in Alexandria, Egypt to Greek parents. At the age of six, she moved with her family to Athens because of the political events that were taking place back then in Egypt.

In 2015, she served as the Alternate Minister for Tourism in the Caretaker Cabinet of Vassiliki Thanou-Christophilou.

Notably, Protopsalti’s music has reached a worldwide audience; her song “Ola Afta Pou Fovamai,” an adaptation of Nickelback’s “How You Remind Me,” is featured in 2026 video game Grand Theft Auto VI.

== Discography ==
=== Studio albums ===
Protopsalti has released 16 studio albums. Her best selling album to date is the 1997 album San Ifestio Pou Xipna which sold more than 100,000 copies.

Title	Year	Peak chart positions		Certifications
Title	Year	CYP	GRE	Certifications
"Apla Tragoudia"	1977	-	-	
"Alkistis Protopsalti"	1981	1	1	
"Exodos Kindinou"	1983	1	1	
"Kikloforo Ki Oploforo"	1985	1	-	*GRE: Platinum
"Paei I Agapi Mou"	1986	-	-	
"Dikeoma"	1988	1	1	*GRE: Gold
"Dio Vimata Apo Tin Ammo"	1989	-	-	
"Paradehtika"	1991	1	1	*GRE: Platinum
"Anthropon Erga"	1993	1	1	*GRE: Platinum
"San Ifestio Pou Ksipna"	1997	1	1	*GRE: 2× Platinum; *CYP: 2× Platinum
"Idrogies Sferes"	2000	1	1	*GRE: Gold; *CYP: Gold
"Pes Mou Thalassa"	2002	1	1	*GRE: Platinum; *CYP: Platinum
"Na Se Vlepo Na Gelas"	2004	1	1	*GRE: 2× Platinum; *CYP: Platinum
"Sto Oreotero Simio"	2007	1	1	*GRE: Platinum; *CYP: Gold
"Fanera Mistika"	2010	1	1	*GRE: Platinum
"Gia Pou Travas Elpida"	2012	4	5	*GRE: Platinum
"Thea Paradisou"	2014	?	?	*GRE: ?

=== Singles ===
Title	Year	Peak chart positions		Certifications	Album
Title	Year	CYP	GRE	Certifications	Album
"Trava Skandali"	2002	1	1	*GRE: Gold	Pes Mou Thalassa
"S' Agapo" (featuring Antonis Remos)	2002	1	1	*CYP: Gold	Pes Mou Thalassa
"Makria - Makria (Kalby Ekhtarak)"	2003	14	22		Pes Mou Thalassa
"Roz Gravata"	2003	15	30		Pes Mou Thalassa
"O Aggelos Mou"	2004	1	1		Na Se Vlepo Na Gelas
"Ola Auta Pou Fovame (How You Remind Me)"	2005	4	7		Na Se Vlepo Na Gelas
"Kathe Fora Pou Me Koitazeis"	2005	8	6		Na Se Vlepo Na Gelas
"Aperanto Keno"	2007	9	10		Sto Oreotoero Simio
"Pame Hawaii (It's A Pity)"	2008	6	1	*GRE: Platinum	Sto Oreotoero Simio
"Mono Gia Mas (They Don't Care About Us)"	2008	8	10		Sto Oreotoero Simio
"Ela Gia Ligo"	2007	27	32		Sto Oreotoero Simio
"I Agapi Pou Paei" (feat. Stefanos Korkolis)	2010	4	7		Fanera Mistika
"Kokkino"	2010	-	28		Fanera Mistika
"Apelpistika Diathesimi"	2010	3	27		Fanera Mistika
"Se Ola Ta Nisia (Krina Tou Gialou)"	2012	-	-		Gia Pou Travas Elpida
"Lipame Gia Aurio"	2012	-	-		Gia Pou Travas Elpida
"Itan Agapi"	2014	-	-		Thea Paradisou
"Afto to Fos Den Ligostevei"	2014	-	-		Thea Paradisou
