= Dimitra Galani =

Greek singer and songwriter

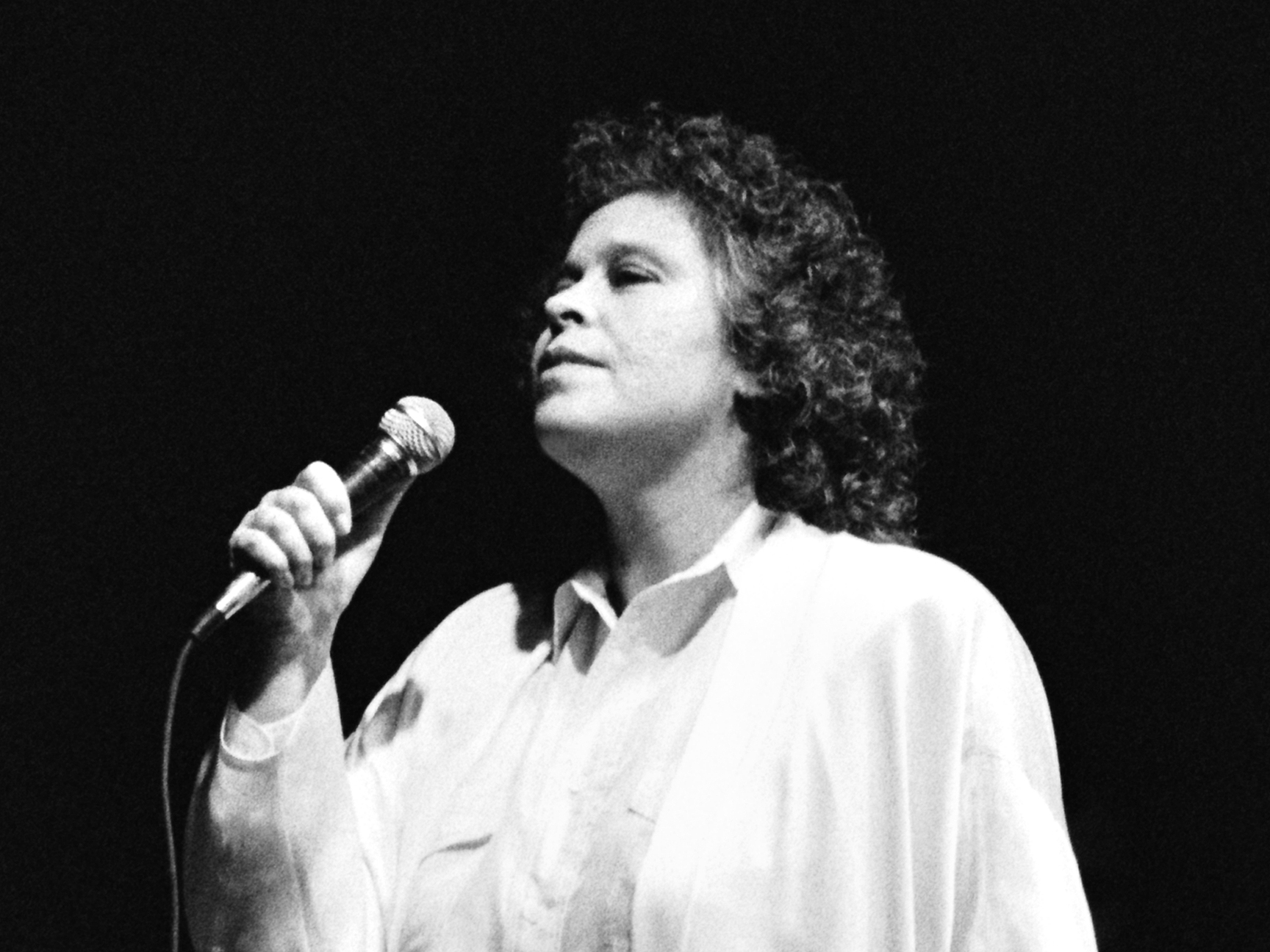
- Dimitra Galani performing in Athens (1991)

Background information
- Born: 14 November 1952 (age 73); Athens, Greece
- Genres: Éntekhno, Greek New Wave, laiko
- Occupations: Singer, composer, songwriter
- Years active: 1968–present

Dimitra Galani (Greek: Δήμητρα Γαλανή; born 14 November 1952) is a Greek singer and songwriter.

== Biography ==
Galani was born in 1952 in Athens and began her musical career at the age of 16, providing vocals on several tracks of Dimos Moutsis and Nikos Gatsos on the album "A Smile": (Greek: Ένα Χαμόγελο).

She subsequently contributed to Manos Hatzidakis' 1971 album "Land of Gold" [gr: 'Της Γης Το Χρυσάφι'], providing vocals on six of the twelve tracks included on the album. In that same year, she released her first eponymous solo album.

Galani continues to collaborate with notable Greek composers and performers. In addition to Hatzidakis, Galani has collaborated with composers such as Dimos Moutsis, Manos Loizos, Giorgos Hatzinasios, Giannis Spanos, Vassilis Tsitsanis, Mikis Theodorakis and performers such as Alkistis Protopsalti and Haris Alexiou. Her discography spans both traditional laika and entekhna genres as well as Greek pop and Greek New Wave.

In recent years, Galani has composed music both for her own solo work and for feature films and TV, work for which she won the Arion award for the song 'Pull the Trigger' [gr: 'Τράβα σκανδάλη'] and the Prosopa award for the film soundtrack of 'Taxim'.

== Discography ==
The list refers to Galani's personal discography:

- 1971 Dimitra Galani (Δήμητρα Γαλάνη)
- 1973 Dimitra Galani 2 (Δήμητρα Γαλάνη)
- 1974 O Kampos (Ο κάμπος)
- 1975 Leptomereies (Λεπτομέρειες)
- 1978 M’ Agapouses Thymamai (Μ' αγαπούσες θυμάμαι)
- 1979 Eikones (Εικόνες)
- 1980 Ta Tragoudia tis Hhesinis Meras (Τα τραγούδια της χθεσινής μέρας)
- 1981 Kala einai ki etsi (Καλά είναι κι έτσι)
- 1982 Hairetismoi (Χαιρετισμοί)
- 1983 Ateleiotos Dromos (Ατελείωτος δρόμος)
- 1984 Kanonika (Κανονικά)
- 1985 Mia Vradia m’ena Tragoudi (Μια βραδιά μ'ενα τραγούδι)
- 1985 Hanomai Giati Remvazo (Χάνομαι γιατί ρεμβάζω)
- 1986 Paihnidi gia Dyo (παιχνίδι για δύο)
- 1988 Ex' Epafis (Εξ επαφής)
- 1989 I Parastasi Arhizei (Η παράσταση αρχίζει)
- 1990 Gia Piano kai Foni (Για πιάνο και φωνή)
- 1991 Fos (Φως)
- 1992 M’ Ena Glyko Anastenagmo (Μ'ενα γλυκό αναστεναγμό)
- 1994& 1996 I Dimitra Galani sto Harama 1&2 (Η Δήμητρα Γαλάνη στο Χάραμα 1&2)
- 1995 Anasa I Techni tis Kardias (Ανάσα η τέχνη της καρδιάς)
- 1997 Ta Chartina (Τα χάρτινα)
- 1998 Horos me ti Skia mou (Χορός με τη σκιά μου)
- 1999 Na Meinoun Mono ta Tragoudia (Να μείνουν μόνο τα τραγούδια)
- 2001 Meta (Μετά)
- 2003 Tha to Metanioseis (Θα το μετανιώσεις)
- 2004 Epi Skinis (Επί σκηνής)
- 2004 To S’agapo Mporei (Το σ'αγαπώ μπορεί)
- 2007 Dama Koupa (Ντάμα κούπα)
- 2009 Pixel (Πίξελ)
