= Stavros Xarchakos =

Greek composer and conductor

Stavros Xarchakos Σταύρος Ξαρχάκος
- Born: 14 March 1939 (age 87); Athens, Greece
- Genre: Éntekhno
- Occupations: Composer, conductor

Stavros Xarchakos (Greek: Σταύρος Ξαρχάκος [ˈstavros ksarˈxakos]; born 14 March 1939) is a Greek composer and conductor.

Internationally he is known as the composer for the Rembetiko film score, composing the music for the Werner Herzog film Signs Of Life, and composing the music for the 1983 BBC TV mini series, The Dark Side of the Sun.

== Biography ==
Stavros Xarchakos was born in Athens, where he studied at the Athens Conservatoire. He has family origins from the Mani Peninsula. He emerged in the Greek music scene around 1963, composing music for the theatre and cinema. Among his collaborators was lyricist Lefteris Papadopoulos and singer Nikos Xylouris.

In 1967, he went to Paris to study with Nadia Boulanger. He stayed in Paris for four years, and then studied with David Diamond at the Juilliard School of Music in New York. He served as director of the National Orchestra of Greek Music.

He was later involved in politics and was elected Member of the Greek Parliament twice, before becoming a Member of the European Parliament (MEP) from 2000 to 2004. He was again a candidate for the European Parliament with New Democracy, in the elections of 25 May 2014, but was not elected.
