= Arion Music Awards =

Greek music industry awards

- Sponsored by: IFPI
- Date: 2002–2007
- Country: Greece

Television/radio coverage
- Networks
- Mega Channel (2002–06); ANT1 (2007)

The Arion Music Awards (Greek : Μουσικά Βραβεία Αρίων) were the Greek music industry's awards program from 2002 to 2007. The organizer was IFPI along with Mega Channel (2002–06) and ANT1 (2007). The awards were named after ancient Greek poet Arion. Other older Greek music awards were the Pop Corn Music Awards and the Thessaloniki Music Festival and newer awards are the MAD Video Music Awards. The awards were general awards and special awards concerned with the various Greek music genres (Éntekhno, Laiko, Modern Laiko and Pop music. The winners were determined by voting of music producers and music reporters.

== General ==
=== Best Album ===
Edition	Best Album	Artist	Ref.
2002	Mikres Fotografies	Giannis Ploutarchos	
2003	Kardia Mou Min Anisiheis	Antonis Remos	
2004	Os tin Akri tou Ouranou sou	Haris Alexiou	
2005	Epikindina Agapas	Giannis Vardis	
2006	Ola Se Sena Ta Vrika	Giannis Ploutarchos	
2007	Filoi ki Ehthroi	Michalis Hatzigiannis	

=== Best Song ===
Edition	Best Song	Composer	Lyricist	Ref.
2002	"Thalassa mou Skoteini"	Nikos Portokaloglou	Nikos Portokaloglou	
2003	"Trava Skandali"	Dimitra Galani	Myrto Kontova	
2004	"Treno"	Vangelis Vasileiou	Sophie Pappa	
2005	"O Angelos mou"	Stefanos Korkolis	Nikos Moraitis	
2006	"Kernao"	Phoebus	Phoebus	
2007	"Ola i Tipota"	Michalis Hatzigiannis	Nikos Moraitis	

=== Best Male Artist ===
Edition	Best Artist	Ref.
2002	Giannis Ploutarchos	
2003	Antonis Remos	
2004	Thodoris Ferris	
2005	Paschalis Terzis	
2006	Antonis Remos	
2007	Stelios Maximos	

=== Best Female Artist ===
Edition	Best Artist	Ref.
2002	Anna Vissi	
2003	Despina Vandi	
2004	Haris Alexiou	
2005	Alkistis Protopsalti	
2006	Peggy Zina	
2007	Helena Paparizou	

== Entechno ==
Edition	Best Album	Best Band	Best Male Artist	Best Female Artist	Ref.
2002	Brazilero - Nikos Portokaloglou	Pyx Lax	Giannis Kotsiras	Eleftheria Arvanitaki	
2003	Giannis Kotsiras (live) - Giannis Kotsiras	Domenica	Giannis Vardis	Eleftheria Arvanitaki	
2004	Os tin Akri tou Ouranou sou - Haris Alexiou	Pyx Lax	Alkinoos Ioannidis	Haris Alexiou	
2005	Na se Vlepo na Gelas - Alkistis Protopsalti	Kitrina Podilata	Giannis Vardis	Alkistis Protopsalti	
2006	Kathe Telos ki Arhi - Eleni Tsaligopoulou	Heimerinoi Kolymvites	Pantelis Thalassinos	Eleni Tsaligopoulou	
2007	Vissino kai Neratzi - Haris Alexiou				

== Laiko ==
Edition	Best Album	Best Male Artist	Best Female Artist	Ref.
2002	Mikres Fotografies - Giannis Ploutarchos	Giannis Ploutarchos	Glykeria	
2003	Kardia Mou Min Anisiheis - Antonis Remos	Antonis Remos	Natassa Theodoridou	
2004	Mia Anapnoi - Antonis Remos	Thodoris Ferris	Haris Alexiou	
2005	Sta Ypogeia Einai i Thea - Paschalis Terzis	Paschalis Terzis	Peggy Zina	
2006	Ola Se Sena Ta Vrika - Giannis Ploutarchos	Giannis Ploutarchos	Peggy Zina	
2007	Einai Kapoies Agapes - Paschalis Terzis			

== Modern Laiko ==
Edition	Best Album	Best Male Artist	Best Female Artist	Ref.
2002	Mia Nihta Mono - Antonis Remos	Notis Sfakianakis	Katy Garbi Natassa Theodoridou	
2003	Kardia Mou Min Anisiheis - Antonis Remos	Antonis Remos	Natassa Theodoridou	
2004	Ta Amartola Sou Matia - Thodoris Ferris	Thodoris Ferris	Maria Iakovou	

== Pop music ==
Edition	Best Album	Best Band	Best Male Artist	Best Female Artist	Ref.
2002	Apogeiosi - Iro	Nama	Sakis Rouvas	Iro	
2003	Adinamia Mou - Harry Varthakouris	Ble	Harry Varthakouris	Anna Vissi	
2004	Ta Pio Megala S'agapo - C:Real	Dytikes Synoikies	Sakis Rouvas	Eirini Merkouri	
2005	Epikindina Agapas - Giannis Vardis	C:Real	Giannis Vardis	Helena Paparizou	
2006	S'eho Erotefthi - Sakis Rouvas	Nama	Sakis Rouvas	Helena Paparizou	
2007	Filoi Kai Ehthroi - Michalis Hatzigiannis				

== Soundtracks ==
Edition	Best Soundtrack (Film/TV series/Play)	Artists	Ref.
2002	Brazilero	Nikos Portokaloglou	
2003	Kourastika na Skotono tous Agapitikous sou		
2004	Leni	Dimitris Papadimitriou, Foteini Darra	
2005	Mi mou Les Antio; Brides	Christos Nikolopoulos; Stamatis Spanoudakis	
2006	Loafing and Camouflage: Sirens in the Aegean	Vanessa Adamapoulou, Dimitris Kontopoulos	
2007	2	K.Bhta	
