= Akis Katsoupakis =

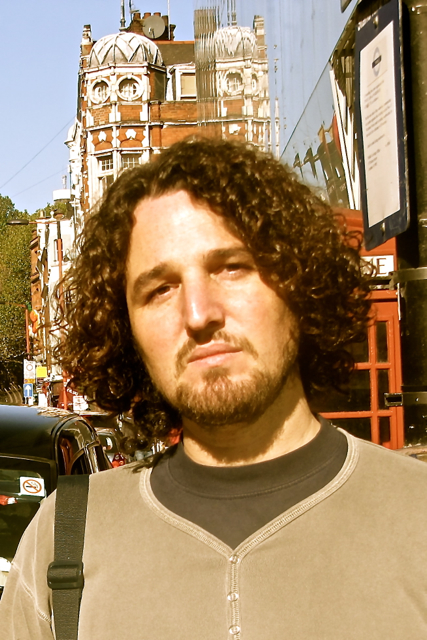
- In London, 2011.

Background information
- Also known as: akicats, Akis-cats-Katsoupakis
- Born: Theodosios Katsoupakis; 3 October 1972 (age 54)
- Origin: Thessaloniki, Greece
- Genre: Alternative pop
- Occupations: Arranger, producer, keyboardist
- Instruments: Piano, keyboard
- Years active: 1989–present
- Website: Facebook profile

Akis Katsoupakis (Greek: Άκης Κατσουπάκης) is a Greek musician, arranger and record producer.
His most commercially acclaimed album (arranged and co-produced) is Sokratis Malamas's O Fylakas ki o Vasilias (2000) which includes the classic Prigkipesa.

His work includes arranging for multi-platinum albums (Eleftheria Arvanitaki – Ola Sto Fos) – (George Dalaras – Sta Tragoudia Pou Sou Grafo)

== Biography ==
Born and raised in Thessaloniki, Greece, he studied piano, classical harmony, and counterpoint. Later on, he took lessons in jazz theory and jazz piano and also seminars on electronic music (ICMC '97). Katsoupakis has been working as a professional keyboard player since 1989. After playing with several bands, in 1994 he joined the band Maskes, which turned out to be one of the bands that formed the so-called indie rock scene of Thessaloniki.

Since 1997 he has carried out orchestration and production for studio recordings and live concerts working with many of the industry's big names.
He also appears as a string section arranger, a sound engineer, programmer, mixer and mastering engineer.
His debut studio album as an arranger and producer was "Zilion" (1997).

== Discography arranged by Akis Katsoupakis ==
- Pes To Pali Agapi Mou – Paschalis Arvanitides: Arrangement for track #2: Palia Mou Gitonia (1995, EMI SA)
- Zilion – Zilion: Whole album arrangement (1997, Ano Kato Records)
- Klis' Ta Matia Sou Ke Kita – Dimitris Zervoudakis: Whole album arrangement (1998, Minos EMI)
- Krypse Kati N' Agapiso – Manthos Arbelias: Whole album arrangement (1998, Mylos Records)
- Zoi - Erasitehnes Erastes: Whole EP arrangement (1998, Ano Kato Records)
- Kathe Deftero Lepto – Maskes Whole album arrangement (1998, Ano Kato Records)
- Ypoprtos Kosmos – Theodosia Tsatsou: Whole album arrangement (1999, Minos EMI)
- 21os Akatallilos – Sakis Rouvas: Arrangement and production for track #4: Kanoume Onira"Kanoume Onira" (2000, Minos EMI)
- Vary Fortio – Eugene Dermitassoglou: Whole album production (2000, Mylos Records)
- Shedio Me Vrohi – Maskes: Whole EP arrangement and production (2000, Minos EMI)
- O Fylakas Ki O Vasilias – Sokratis Malamas: Whole album arrangement and co-production (2000, Lyra)
- 'Ston P' Afieroma ston Pavlo Sidiropoulo - Various Artists: Arrangement for track #4: Pes Mou An Thelis Kati performed by Maskes (2000 Minos EMI)
- Gefsi Pelagous – Iris Mavraki: Whole EP arrangement (2001, Fm Records)
- Gefires Stis Taratses – Maskes: Whole album arrangement (2002, Minos EMI)
- Fones (Remastered) – Nikos Portokaloglou Arrangement and production for track #12: Den Meno Pia Edo - Remix 2002 (2003, Minos EMI)
- Os Tin Akri Tou Ouranou Sou – Haris Alexiou: Arrangement for tracks: #4: To Poly Mazi Skotoni, #5: Esi Me Xeris Pio Poli, #8: "Ola Ine Sto Myalo" (2003, Minos EMI)
- Sto Diastima Drapetes - Zak Stefanou: Whole album co-arrangement (2003 Sony Music)
- Dipsa - Nikos Portokaloglou: Arrangements for String section, and Co-arrangements for the whole album (2003 Merury Universal)
- Three Songs – Eleftheria Arvanitaki: Main EP arranger (2004, Universal)
- Ola Sto Fos – Eleftheria Arvanitaki: Whole album arrangement (2004, Universal)
- Sta Tragoudia Pou Sou Grafo – George Dalaras: Main album arranger (2005, Minos EMI)
- Min Pis Pote – Andriana Babali: Whole album arrangement and production (2005, Minos EMI)
- Kathe Telos Ki Arhi – Eleni Tsaligopoulou: Arrangement for tracks: #4: Opia Zoi Ke Na Zisis, #5: Mazi Os To Ximeroma", #7: Den Tha Figo Apo Do" (2005, Sony Music)
- Fyra - Nikos Ioakimidis: Arranged track #2: Chronia Polla (2006, Universal)
- To Leoforio Tis Stigmis – Kostas Antypas: Whole album arrangement (2007, Protasis)
- San Psemata – Eleni Tsaligopoulou: Arrangement for tracks: #2: Sto Miso Krevati, #12: Mazi Os To Ximeroma (2008, Sony music)
- Pandos Itan Nychta - La Pouppé – Stella Gadedi: Whole album arrangement (2008, Lyra)
- Isalos Grammi - Yorgos Kazantzis: Arrangement for track #6: Me Ena Zepelin (2008, Polytropon)
- Ki Alli Mera Perase – Kostas Triantafyllides: Whole EP arrangement (2009, Music Post)
- Kratisou Ap' Ti Stachti - Kostas Livadas: Arrangement for track #10 "Antio Agapi Mou Palia" (2010, Melody Maker Single Member P.C.)
- Mona Lisa – Stella Gadedi featuring Antigone Buna: Whole album arrangement (2010, Lyra)
- O Tzon Tzon Zi – Andriana Babali: Whole album production and arrangement (2010, Minos EMI)
- Ta Tzitzikia Tou Himona - Trifono: Arrangement for tracks: #7: Ena Thelo Mono & #9: Thelo Na Me Thes (2010 Trifono)
- Mesa Vrehei - Kostas Antypas: Whole album Production & Arrangement (2012, Prospero)
- Bras De Fer – Giorgos Astritis: Whole album Production and Arrangement (2013 – Mikros Heros)
- To Mystiko Tou Kosmou - Dimitris Livanos: Arrangement for tracks: #4: To Omorfotero Louloudi and #10: Pes Mou Pos (2013 Music Links Knowledge)
- Ta Ylika Ton Mystikon – Zacharias Karounis Album (7 tracks) production and arrangement (2013 – Mikri Arktos)
- To Mazi Einai Dromos – Andriana Babali: Whole album production and arrangement (2014, Feelgood Records)
- Paragelia Best Of (Live) - Lavrentis Machairitsas & Yannis Kotsiras: Arrangements for all album, recorded live (2016, Minos EMI)
- Oute Gi'Asteio - Andriana Babali & Rous: Single Production & Arrangement (2016, Feelgood Records)
- Ston Aera Tou Melodia - Various Artists: Arrangement for track #26: Mia Agapi Mikri (2016, Feelgood Records)
- To S'Agapo - Adam Tsarouchis: Single Production & Arrangement (2017 Hidden Track Records)
- Treis Epohes – George Kiriakos: Whole album Production and Arrangement (2017 – Panik Records)
- Menexedes Kai Zouboulia - Konstantina Tsirimona: Single Production and Arrangement (2017, Hidden Track Records)
- Ellines Filellines – Stamatis Chatziefstathiou: Whole album Production and Arrangement (2017, Technis Politeia)
- FC Spot - Kirsten: Single Production and Arrangement (2017, Voice Entertainment)
- Spell - Andriana Babali: Single Production and Arrangement (2018, Minos EMI)
- Sou Krivo Thn Agapi Mou - Manos Pirovolakis: Single Production and Arrangement (2019, Mikros Heros)
- Alla Logia - Yanna Vasileiou: Single Production and Arrangement (2019, Panik Oxygen)
- Theli I Nyhta Paramithia - Evi Siamanta: Single Production and Arrangement (2019, Heaven Music)
- Sopainontas - Evi Siamanta: Single Production and Arrangement (2019, Heaven Music)
- Lathos - Evi Siamanta: Single Production and Arrangement (2019, Heaven Music)
- Grecospectiva 90s - Various Artists: Production & Arrangement for track #12: La Plage De Saint Tropez (2019 Amour Records)
- Ta Potamia - Georgia Dagaki: Single Production and Arrangement (2020, Panik Oxygen)
- San Prigipessa - Evi Mazi: Single Arrangement (2020, Mikros Heros)
- Gialinos Kosmos - Nikos Kouroupakis: Single Production and Arrangement (2020, Music Links Knowledge)
- L'Amour - Andriana Babali: Single Production and Arrangement (2020, Minos EMI)
- Galliko Fili - Andriana Babali: Single Production and Arrangement (2020, Minos EMI)
- To Nero Ton Stagiaton - Various Artists: Single Production and Arrangement (2020, Ogdoo Music Group)
- Fos - Rahil Tselepidou: Single Production and Arrangement (2021, Heaven Music)
- Pathos - Georgia Dagaki: Main album Arranger (2021, Georgia Dagaki)
- Ela Mazi Mou - Rahil Tselepidou: Single Production and Arrangement (2021, Heaven Music)
- To Kima - Manos Pirovolakis: Single Production and Arrangement (2021, Ogdoo Music Group)
- Apanemistas - Various Artists: Album Arrangement (2021, Apanemistas)
- Carol Of The Jingle Bells - Fortissimo: Single Production and Arrangement (2021, Fortissimo)
- Mia Agapi Mikri (Radio Live Remastered) - Andriana Babali: Single Production and Arrangement (2022, bbli)
- Sikose Kyma - Andriana Babali: Single Production and Arrangement (2022, Minos EMI)

== Arrangements for live shows ==
- 2004-2005 Haris Alexiou – Eleftheria Arvanitaki, arrangements for live shows across Greece.
- 2005 (Summer) Eleftheria Arvanitaki, arrangements for live tour in Spain
- 2006 Eleni Tsaligopoulou - Andriana Babali - Rallia Christidou, arrangements for summer tour.
- 2006-2007 Orpheas Peridis - Georgia Dagaki, arrangements for concerts across Greece
- 2007 Andriana Babali – Giorgis Christodoulou "In the Kitschen", arrangements for live concerts.
- 2007 Eleni Tsaligopoulou – Yannis Kotsiras, arrangements for summer tour.
- 2008 Eleni Tsaligopoulou – Andriana Babali – Giota Nega "Tis Gynekas i Kardia" show, arrangements.
- 2009 Eleni Tsaligopoulou – Glykeria – Trifono, arrangements for concerts in Athens.
- 2011 Stella Gadedi "Stis Paryfes tis polis", arrangements for presentation concert in Athens Concert Hall
- 2013-2014 Yannis Kotsiras – Thanos Mikroutsikos, arrangements for live shows in Greece and Cyprus
- 2013-2017 Yannis Kotsiras, arrangements for live shows across Greece and abroad
- 2015-2016 Yannis Kotsiras – Lavrentis Machairitsas, arrangements for live shows in Greece and Cyprus
- 2016-2018 Babis Stokas, arrangements for live shows across Greece and Cyprus.
- 2016-Present "Andriana Babali Quarderinas Quartet", arrangements for live shows in Greece and Cyprus
- 2017-2018 Ellines Filellines, arrangements for Philhellenism tribute concerts featuring Pandelis Thalassinos, Dimitris Kataleifos, Yannis Kotsiras, Stavros Zalmas, Stamatis Chatziefstathiou, Lina Nikolakopoulou, Vasilis Lekkas, Despina Bempedeli, Andriana Babali, Aris Lembesopoulos
- 2019 Vicky Karatzoglou, arrangements for concerts in Athens
- 2022 Stamatis Chatziefstathiou, arrangements for concerts across Greece.
- 2024-2025 Yannis Kotsiras, arrangements for concerts across Greece.

== Collaborations ==
- Haris Alexiou
- Eleftheria Arvanitaki
- Andriana Babali
- Dimitris Bassis
- Cayetano
- George Dalaras
- Stathis Drogosis
- Petros Gaitanos
- Yannis Kotsiras
- Lavrentis Machairitsas
- Sokratis Malamas
- Thanos Mikroutsikos
- Dimitris Mitropanos
- Orpheas Peridis
- Nikos Portokaloglou
- Dionysis Savvopoulos
- Babis Stokas
- Eleni Tsaligopoulou
- Tania Tsanaklidou
- Theodosia Tsatsou
- Maria Voumvaki
- Dimitris Zervoudakis
