= Andriana Babali =

Greek singer and songwriter

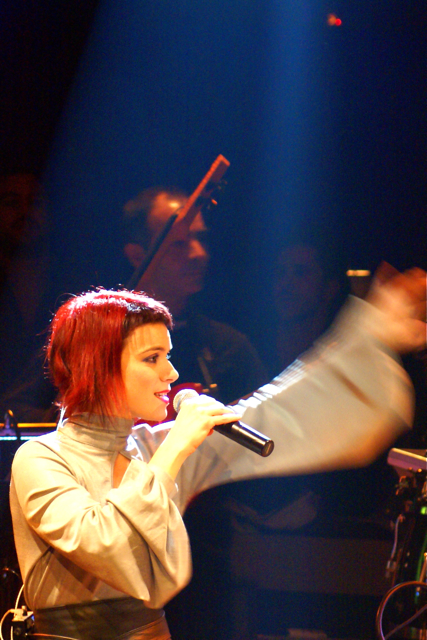
- Andriana Babali in 2007

Background information
- Born: 9 October 1976 (age 50); Athens, Greece
- Genres: Alternative pop, pop, éntekhno, indie pop
- Occupations: Singer, songwriter
- Instruments: Vocals, guitar, percussion
- Years active: 1998–present
- Label: UMG Minos EMI

Andriana Babali (Greek: Ανδριάνα Μπάμπαλη; born 1976) is a Greek singer and songwriter.

== Biography ==
Born and raised in Athens, Greece, Andriana studied economics and music. She began singing as a vocalist/percussionist with rock singer-songwriter Nikos Portokaloglou Band in 1998. This led to her first studio recording 'Den Ein' Arga", included in the 'Brazilero' film OST, which became a major radio hit followed by her first solo album 'Kai I Gi Gyrizei', after signing with Universal Music. She sang 'Gine Kommatia (Nocturnal Reggae)' on Portokaloglou's album 'Dipsa' and it became a major hit in both Greece and France. France's Ethnic Radio 'RFI Musique' included Gine Kommatia to their Top 10 list for over 3 months.

In 2004, Andriana was nominated for the 'Arion Awards' (Greece's most popular Music Awards) in the category for 'Best New Artist' and 'Best Female Pop Singer'. That same year, she appeared on Stefanos Korkolis's album 'Anemoptero' singing the title song, and on Kostas Livadas's 'Ti Hronia Ki Afti', singing 'Mia Mera Emine Akoma'.

During the Winter of 2004–2005, she performed alongside George Dalaras. In May 2005 she released her second studio album 'Min Pis Pote', following a new contract with Minos EMI. This album was repackaged in February 2006 featuring a new song by Stefanos Korkolis (music) and Rebecca Roussi (lyrics) which was used in a popular TV advertisement.

In June 2007, she released her third studio album 'Des Kathara'. The title song's music video, an adaptation of Calogero's 'Face à la mer' with Greek lyrics by Nikos Moraitis, directed by Maria Skoka, won the Best Music Video Award for the Greek Video Music Awards 2008.

During the summer of 2008, she performed alongside Haris Alexiou and Babis Stokas, giving concerts throughout Greece, Cyprus, Turkey, and Israel.

In May 2009, she released her fourth album 'The Rose Tattoo', a selection of 1950s and 1960s Greek and international hits, arranged by composer Minos Matsas. This album was recorded in Los Angeles and Athens, Greece, using Skype.
In late 2010, Babali released her fifth studio album titled 'O Tzon Tzon Zi' (John-John is alive) which is entirely written and composed by lyricist Nikos Moraitis and virtuoso violist and composer Stamos Semsis.

Around that time, the successful Greek TV series The Island used 'Ise Esi O Anthropos Mou' (from her 2009 album: The Rose Tattoo) for the series theme song, which ranked #1 in iTunes (Gr) sales, whilst it's been rereleased, included in the OST. The winter of 2011, she collaborated in the studio and in live performances with Michalis Hatzigiannis giving concerts across Greece, Cyprus, North America, and Canada.

After a studio collaboration with George Dalaras on his album 'Ti Tha Pei Etsi Einai', Andriana toured with him throughout Greece and Cyprus.

At the same time, she composed music for the 'Dagipoli Dance Co' show 'HUMATERRA', and performed live in it, giving shows in the Athens Concert Hall, in Istanbul and Piccolo Teatro (Milan).

Late 2014 she released "To Mazi Einai Dromos", an album containing her own compositions, with lyrics by Nikos Moraitis. Two years later the TV-series "I Leksi Pou De Les" used "Mesopelaga" from this album for series theme song.

During the winter of 2015–2016 she collaborated on stage with Babis Stokas, and the summer of 2016 gave concerts performing with the great Greek Composer Mimis Plessas.

In the summer of '18 she performed as a guest with international rock band Calexico at the Odeon of Herodes Atticus giving two sold-out concerts.

Early '18 she released her first song with English lyrics "Spell", and later "L' Amour" with French lyrics written by Poseidonas Giannopoulos, followed by a Greek version with lyrics by Monsieur Minimal.

== Actress ==
- In 2010, Ari Bafalouka's (Director) film entitled 'Apnea', where Andriana co-starred with well known Greek actors such as Giorgos Karamihos, Youlika Skafida, Iro Moukiou and Akilas Karazisis, aired in the Montreal World Film Festival. The film received very positive reviews from critics and was selected for the Fipresci and Audience Award at the 51st Thessaloniki Film Festival, and the Audience Award 'Best Film' in SEE FEST – Los Angeles 2011. The film screened at several festivals worldwide, and premiered in Greek theatres in January 2011.
- In early 2011, Andriana participated in a theatrical production for the first time, acting as well as singing, for Yorgos Nanouris's play 'Greece 11'.
- During winter '16-'17 she co-starred in the musical theatre show "As Erhosoun Gia Ligo", the story of the great Greek composer Michalis Souyioul with Giannis Bezos and Tania Tripi
- Late 2019 she co-starred with Marianna Toumasatou in "Nura Ena Penthimo Blues" a theatre play about refugees in Greece by Vassia Argenti, singing and acting. The theme song was nominated for "Best Theatre Play Song" in the 2020 Korfiatika Theatre Awards.
- During summer 2021 she is co-starring with Christos Thivaios, Violeta Ikari and Kostas Triantafyllidis in the musical theatre play "Pos Na Sopaso", with the great Kostas Kazakos as narrator, directed by Tzeni Kollia.

== Quarderinas ==
Having formed an "All Girl" group (Andriana Babali Quarderinas Quartet) she is touring across Greece and Cyprus.

== Discography ==
Andriana Babali discography
- Studio albums: 6
- Extended plays: 1
- Soundtrack albums: 4
- Singles: 15
- Music videos: 17

=== Albums ===
| Year | Title | Catalog number | Info |
|---|---|---|---|
| 2003 | Kai I Gi Gyrizei | Mercury 044003847224 | Composed by Kostas Livadas, Ch.Moutatoglou, N.Portokaloglou, D.Mitsotakis, and A.Babali, produced by Ch.Mouratoglou |
| 2005 | Min Pis Pote | ΕΜΙ 094634794626 | Composed by Dimitra Galani, Thodoris Gonis, Kostas Livadas, Nikos Moraitis, Stamos Semsis, George Pavrianos, and A.Babali, produced by Akis Katsoupakis |
| 2006 | Min Pis Pote (Re-edition) | ΕΜΙ 094634794626 | Re-edition of the 2005 album, with a new track addition "Mazi Theos" (Stefanos Korkolis-Rebecca Roussi) |
| 2007 | Des Kathara | ΕΜΙ 5099950042029 | Composed by Mikael Delta, Nikos Moraitis, N.Portokaloglou, K.Livadas, Sunny Baltzi, G.Theofanides, Giannis Nastas, and A.Babali, & a French pop song cover "Des Kathara (Face à la mer)" produced by Giannis Nastas |
| 2009 | The Rose Tattoo | ΕΜΙ 5099996597224 | A selection of 1950s and 1960s International hits, arranged by Minos Matsas |
| 2010 | O Tzon Tzon Zi | ΕΜΙ 5099991953421 | Music of Stamos Semsis with lyrics by Nikos Moraitis, produced by Akis Katsoupakis & Stamos Semsis |
| 2014 | To Mazi Einai Dromos | Feelgood Records 5210033000273 (2021 re-issue) bbli 195919023087 | Her own music with lyrics of her own and Nikos Moraitis, produced by Akis Katsoupakis |

=== Singles ===
| Year | Title | Catalog number | Info |
|---|---|---|---|
| 2005 | Min Pis Pote | ΕΜΙ 094634794503 | Enhanced CD, includes the album version of the track, and also the Music Video |
| 2006 | Me Hriazete | ΕΜΙ 094637084557 | Track from "Min Pis Pote" album, in 4 different versions |
| 2013 | Pente Vimata | Feelgood Records 5205969127439 (Digital) (2021 re-issue) bbli 196051156527 | Her own composition with lyrics by Nikos Moraitis, produced by Akis Katsoupakis. First single out of the forthcoming album "To Mazi Einai Dromos" |
| 2013 | Ta Daxtylidia | Feelgood Records 5054227001086 (Digital) (2021 re-issue) bbli 196051107932 | Her own composition with lyrics by Nikos Moraitis, produced by Akis Katsoupakis. Second single out of the forthcoming album |
| 2014 | T'Akoustika (feat. Onirama) | Feelgood Records 5054227041891 (Digital) (2021 re-issue) bbli 196051102784 | Her own composition with lyrics by Nikos Moraitis, produced by Akis Katsoupakis |
| 2015 | Kali Chronia – Her Majesty's Sound Mix | Feelgood Records 5054227085673 (Digital) | Her own music and lyrics, produced by Her Majesty's Sound |
| 2016 | Oute Gi'Asteio | Feelgood Records 5054526711082 (Digital) (2021 re-issue) bbli 196053340313 | A duet with singer-songwriter Rous on a Rous composition and lyrics by G.Gounas, produced by Akis Katsoupakis |
| 2017 | Neraida | Feelgood Records 5054526757257 (Digital) (2022 re-issue) bbli 196700664700 | Collaboration with songwriter "Livin R" and Dimitris Yfantis, produced by Livin R |
| 2018 | Spell | Universal EMI 0602567375722 (Digital) | Artist's first English spoken song, her own composition, produced by Akis Katsoupakis |
| 2018 | Neraida (Remixes) | Feelgood Records 5054526339996 (Digital) | 8 Remixes of the song "Neraida" |
| 2018 | Spell (By Alex Leon) | Universal EMI 0602567562818 (Digital) | "Spell" as presented at the Madwalk 2018 as a duet with Thodoris Marantinis produced by Alex Leon |
| 2020 | L' Amour | Universal EMI 0602507242404 (Digital) | Artist's first French spoken song, her own composition with lyrics by Poseidonas Giannopoulos, produced by Akis Katsoupakis |
| 2020 | Galliko Fili | Universal EMI 0602507377564 (Digital) | Greek version of the previous release with lyrics by Monsieur Minimal, produced by Akis Katsoupakis |
| 2022 | Mia Agapi Mikri (Radio Live Remastered) | bbli 196697375658 (Digital) | Adaptation of a 90s hit by Mikael Delta originally performed by Tania Tsanaklidou (Remastered) |
| 2022 | Sikose Kyma | Universal EMI 0602448199218 (Digital) | Song written by Kostas Livadas |
| 2023 | Mi Mou Milas Gia Kalokeria | Universal EMI 0602458713442 (Digital) | Adaptation of the 90's platinum hit, composed by Michalis Rakintzis, originally performed by Sophia Arvaniti. Performed as a duet with Giorgis Christodoulou |
| 2024 | Kathe Iouli | Lefteris Samson / Minos EMI SA 00602478649011 (Digital) | Song containing excerpts of a poetry recitation by the poet himself Tasos Leivaditis |

=== Collaborations ===
| Year | Title | Album | Album Artist | Catalog number | Info |
|---|---|---|---|---|---|
| 2001 | Den Ein' Arga | Brazilero | Nikos Portokaloglou | Universal 044006410623 | Original Soundtrack of the Brazilero movie by Sotiris Goritsas |
| 2001 | Thalassa Mou Skoteini | Brazilero | Nikos Portokaloglou | Universal 044006410623 | Second voice |
| 2003 | Gine Kommatia – Nychterino Renge | Dipsa | Nikos Portokaloglou | Universal 0602498156520 | Duet with Nikos Portokaloglou |
| 2004 | Anemoptero | Anemoptero | Stefanos Korkolis | Minos EMI 724357866927 | Self-title song |
| 2004 | Kyma | Palyrria | Palyrria | Cantini 5200105060045 | |
| 2004 | Mia Mera Emine Akoma | Ti Chronia Ki Afti | Kostas Livadas | Akti 5099751773627 | Duet with Kostas Livadas |
| 2005 | Vale Mou Dyskola | Pame Alli Mia Fora (Live '01–'05) | Nikos Portokaloglou | Mercury 0602498727201 | Live Recording |
| 2005 | Mono Esy | Pame Alli Mia Fora (Live '01–'05) | Nikos Portokaloglou | Mercury 0602498727201 | Live Recording, duet with Nikos Portokaloglou |
| 2005 | Ta Karavia Mou Kaio | Pame Alli Mia Fora (Live '01–'05) | Nikos Portokaloglou | Mercury 0602498727201 | Live Recording, with Nikos Portokaloglou |
| 2005 | Gine Kommatia | Pame Alli Mia Fora (Live '01–'05) | Nikos Portokaloglou | Mercury 0602498727201 | Live Recording, duet with Nikos Portokaloglou |
| 2005 | Panta Dikos Sou | Omorfos Kosmos | Zak Stefanou | Akti 8287676053246 | Duet with Zak Stefanou |
| 2006 | Den Fovame | To Proto Htipima | RG | Minos EMI 094636839424 | Duet with the rapper RG |
| 2006 | Ekina Pou Den Eho | Dakri Sto Giali | Estoudiadina | EMI Greece 0094636262956 | A George Dalaras production, with himself on the second voice. |
| 2006 | Den Xero Poso S'Agapo – Live | Den Xero Poso S'Agapo (Live) | Various Artists | Minos EMI 094636237329 | Live recording featuring many Greek female artists, a tribute to Vicky Moscholiou |
| 2006 | O Lefteris – Live | Den Xero Poso S'Agapo (Live) | Various Artists | Minos EMI 094636237329 | From the same tribute, a duet with Melina Aslanidou |
| 2006 | Ena Asteri Pefti-Pefti – Live | Den Xero Poso S'Agapo (Live) | Various Artists | Minos EMI 094636237329 | From the same tribute |
| 2006 | Ta Therina Sinema – Live | Den Xero Poso S'Agapo (Live) | Various Artists | Minos EMI 094636237329 | From the same tribute, together with Marinella, Haris Alexiou, Dimitra Galani, Eleftheria Arvanitaki, Melina Kana, Glykeria, Eleni Tsaligopoulou, Tania Tsanaklidou, Melina Aslanidou |
| 2006 | Aliti – Live | Den Xero Poso S'Agapo (Live) | Various Artists | Minos EMI 094636237329 | From the same tribute, together with Marinella, Haris Alexiou, Dimitra Galani, Eleftheria Arvanitaki, Melina Kana, Glykeria, Eleni Tsaligopoulou, Tania Tsanaklidou, Melina Aslanidou |
| 2006 | Aspra, Kokkina, Kitrina, Ble – Live | Den Xero Poso S'Agapo (Live) | Various Artists | Minos EMI 094636237329 | From the same tribute, together with Dimitra Galani, Tania Tsanaklidou, Melina Aslanidou |
| 2007 | Des Kathara – Mad VMA Edition | XLI3h | Stereo Mike | Minos EMI 5099951333324 | Duet with rapper Stereo Mike as presented at the 2007 Mad Video Music Awards |
| 2007 | Mpes Sto Klima | WWF – The Green Album | Various Artists | Sony Music Greece 88697220762 | A WWF album for the climate change |
| 2008 | Mou Les | Euro-Revisions | Various Artists | Sony Music Greece 88697220762 | A national television tribute to past Greek Eurovision participations |
| 2008 | Mathima Solfege | Eurorevisions | Διάφοροι | Sony Music Greece 88697220762 | From the same tribute, duet with Giorgis Christodoulou |
| 2008 | Serenata | Lounge Istories | Renos Haralabidis, Ilias Katelanos | Sony Music Greece 886973350928 | The second cover of "Serenata" sung by A.Babali |
| 2009 | T' Asteri | Pantos Itan Nychta (La Poupe) | Stella Gadedi | lyra 3401176704 | From the Soundtrack of the theatrical play "La Poupe" |
| 2009 | Avokanto | Tragoudakia Galaktos | Melpo Chalkoutsaki, Alkisti Chalikia | Impact 5202846790373 | Children song |
| 2009 | Me ena zepelin | Isalos grammi | Yorgos Kazantzis | Polytropon 5205105000497 | |
| 2009 | Avgoustos | Horis Etia | Onirama | Lyra 5202483770783 | With Onirama |
| 2009 | Liberdade / Eleftheria | Segredos do Mar | Citânia | Seven Muses 9789899712706 | |
| 2011 | Sunny Mae (feat.Adriana Babali) | Sunny Mae | Matisse (Greek band) | Columbia 886443153936 | With Matisse (Greek band) |
| 2011 | Vrochi Ton Asterion | Tharros I Alitheia | Michalis Hatzigiannis | Universal 0602527921457 | Duet with singer Michalis Hatzigiannis |
| 2012 | Stagones | Stagones | Lazaros Samaras | Zefxis music 5200387402069 | Duet with singer Pantelis Theocharidis |
| 2012 | Kopse | Ti Tha Pei Etsi Einai | George Dalaras – Nikos Antypas | Universal 0602537178841 | Duet with George Dalaras |
| 2012 | Na Niotho Kai As Min Katalavaino | Ola Ta Nai Tou Kosmou | Various Artists | Panik 5200390300055 | |
| 2014 | Agapi Ti Lene | Agapi Ti Lene | Dimitris Korgialas | Minos EMI 00602537942756 | Together with D.Korgialas & Th.Marantinis |
| 2015 | Poios Xerei? | Otan Arrostise O Ilios: Mousiko Paramythi | Various Artists | Feelgood 5210033000914 | A musical tale together with Matthildi Mangira, Zeraw, Adamantas, Pantelis Kanarakis, Christos Chatzipanagiotis, Melina Makri |
| 2015 | Ekloges | Otan Arrostise O Ilios: Mousiko Paramythi | Various Artists | Feelgood 5210033000914 | A musical tale, together with Christos Chatzipanagiotis, Giannis Zouganelis, Gerasimos Skiadaresis, Melina Makri, Pantelis Kanarakis, Adamantas, Zeraw, Matthildi Mangira |
| 2015 | Logakia Magika | Otan Arrostise O Ilios: Mousiko Paramythi | Various Artists | Feelgood 5210033000914 | A musical tale, together with Giannis Zouganelis, Adamantas, Marina Dakanali, Lefteris Eleftheriou, Pantelis Thalassinos, Pantelis Kanarakis, Matthildi Mangira, Melina Makri, Giannis Bostantzoglou, Alexandra Ousta, Gerasimos Skiadaresis, Alexandros Tzenalis, Christos Chatzipanagiotis, Zeraw |
| 2016 | Se Ena Synnefo | To Imerologio Tis Annas Punk | Dimitris Karras | Puzzle Studio 036 | |
| 2016 | Mia Agapi Mikri | Ston Aera Tou Melodia | Various Artists | Feelgood 5210033001140 | A Melodia FM collection of covers live on radio |
| 2016 | To Vradi – Live | To Poiima Pou Egine Tragoudi (Zontani Ihografisi Sto Votanikos Live Stage) | Various Artists | Feelgood 521003300052 | Live recording, a tribute to poetry in Greek songs. |
| 2017 | Paradeisos | Paradeisos | TAREQ | Amour Records 191018900625 | A Tareq song |
| 2017 | Μ' αγαπάς; (feat. Ανδριάνα Μπάμπαλη) | Μ' αγαπάς; (feat. Ανδριάνα Μπάμπαλη) | Απόλλων Μπόλλας | ACB Productions 5054960273696 | Duet with singer Apollon Bollas |
| 2017 | The Isles Of Greece | Ellines Filellines | Stamatis Chatziefstathiou | Τέχνης Πολιτεία 3614976338141 | Music written on Philhellenic poetry |
| 2017 | Flert | Erotica | Monsieur Minimal | Feelgood 521003300052 | Duet with Monsieur Minimal |
| 2017 | Neraida | Neraida | Livin R | Feelgood 5054526757257 | Duet with singer Dimitris Yfantis |
| 2017 | Min To Pis Pouthena | 18+ | Stathis Drogosis | Minos EMI 0602567255918 | Duet with singer-songwriter Stathis Drogosis |
| 2018 | Oli Horane Sto Galazio | Voutia Sto Galazio | Various Artists | Minos EMI 0602567795889 | A "Safe Water Sports" compilation |
| 2019 | S' Agapo | S' Agapo | Monsieur Minimal & Hiras | EMI Greece 0602577494062 | Cover of the Greek classic (by Nikos Mamangakis & Nikos Foskolos), originally sung by Tzeni Vanou |
| 2019 | La Plage De Saint Tropez | Grecospectiva 90s | Various Artists | Amour Records 193483962016 | Cover of the classic 90s Army of Lovers hit |
| 2019 | Bes Sti Giorti | Voutia Sti Vithoupoli | George Lembesis | Minos EMI 0602508491139 | Music from the "Psarosoupa" children's musical, together with Kalomira, Idra Kayne, Markos Koumaris, George Lembesis, Panos Mouzourakis, Panagiotis Pallis, Sakis Rouvas, Tamta, Charis Varthakouris |
| 2019 | Ammodi Rigofilakia | Voutia Sti Vithoupoli | George Lembesis | Minos EMI 0602508491139 | From the same musical, featuring the "Andreas Lambrou Children Choir" |
| 2020 | Kita Giro | Kita Giro | Yiannis Kotsiras | Minos EMI 0602435298726 | With Y.Kotsiras, A.Rizos, Th.Mavrogiorgis, Komis X |
| 2020 | An Emeis Horisoume | Periodia Entos | Kostas Livadas | Walnut 3616550273336 | Duet with Kostas Livadas |
| 2020 | Ioulis Stin Athina | Fones Thiasou | Stavros Siolas | MINOS EMI 0602435411880 | Duet with singer-songwriter Stavros Siolas |
| 2021 | Oi lexeis pou den vrika | An sas ta tragoudisoume | Giorgis Christodoulou | Mikri Arktos 3616842176277 | Duet with Giorgis Christodoulou |
| 2022 | Mazi | Piase Ena Vivlio! | Tatiana Zografou | MLK 5212006532637 | Children Song, duet with Giorgis Christodoulou |
| 2022 | Pou Pai I Agapi | Piase Ena Vivlio! | Tatiana Zografou | MLK 5212006532637 | Children Song |
| 2023 | Oso Paei - Tritos Orofos | Oso Paei (Tritos Orofos) | Kostas Livadas | Walnut 3617228199491 | Featured singer in this title song for the TV series Tritos Orofos (Hellenic Broadcasting Corporation). |

== Awards and nominations ==
=== Korfiatika Theatre Awards ===
| Year | Recipient | Award | Result |
|---|---|---|---|
| 2020 | Nura Ena Penthimo Blues | Best Theatre Play Song | Nominated |

=== Arion Music Awards ===
| Year | Recipient | Award | Result |
|---|---|---|---|
| 2004 | Kai I Gi Gyrizei | Best New Artist | Nominated |
| 2004 | Kai I Gi Gyrizei | Best Pop Singer | Nominated |
| 2006 | Min Pis Pote | Best Entekhno Album | Nominated |
| 2006 | Min Pis Pote | Best Entekhno Singer | Nominated |

=== MAD Video Music Awards ===
| Year | Recipient | Award | Result |
|---|---|---|---|
| 2004 | Moira Mou Egines | Best Entekhno Video Clip | Nominated |
| 2005 | Mia Mera Emeine Akoma (w/ Kostas Leivadas) | Best Video Clip for Duet | Nominated |
| 2006 | Min Pis Pote | Best Entekhno Video Clip | Nominated |
| 2008 | Des Kathara | Best Entekhno Video Clip | Won |
