= Eleni Tsaligopoulou =

Greek singer (born 1963)

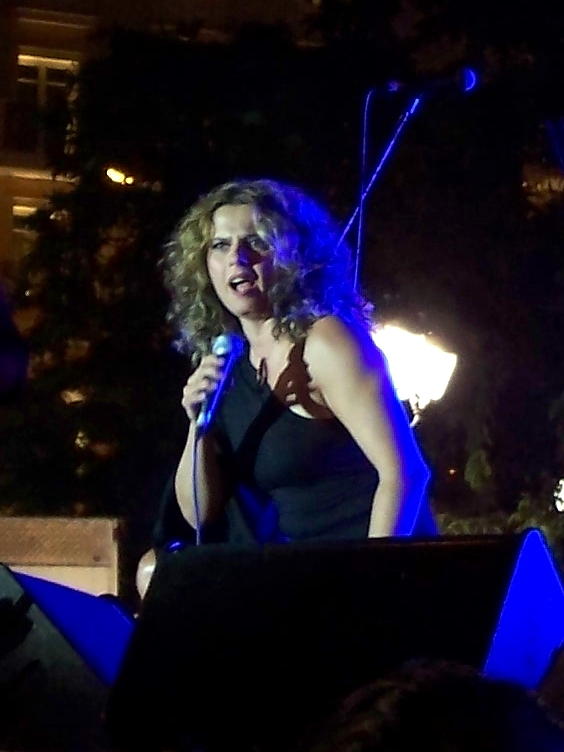
- Eleni Tsaligopoulou performing in July 2007

Background information
- Born: Eleni Tsaligopoulou; April 11, 1963 (age 63)
- Origin: Naousa, Imathia, Greece
- Genres: Pop; folk; traditional
- Occupations: Singer; songwriter
- Instrument: Vocals
- Years active: 1985–present
- Labels: Melodia FM 99.2; Lyra Records; Columbia Records; Akti Records; General Publishing Company S.A.

Eleni Tsaligopoulou (Greek: Ελένη Τσαλιγοπούλου; born 11 April 1963) is a Greek singer who, in the course of a 30-year career, has maintained a position as one of her country's best-selling recording artists.

== Early years ==
Born and raised in Naousa, a city within Imathia regional unit in Greece's administrative region of Central Macedonia, she began performing at an early age, alongside her musician brother. In 1981, she gave birth to a son, Argyris. By 1985, having taken lessons in classical singing, she made her professional debut in Thessaloniki and came into contact with songwriter George Zikas whose songs she performed on her first solo album.

In 1987 she interpreted songs by top Greek composers and songwriters Manos Hadjidakis and Stamatis Spanoudakis and toured Greece, other parts of Europe and also in America with established singing star George Dalaras. Their professional association continued for the next ten years.

She frequently gave concerts in Athens with Dalaras and, although during the early years of her career, her voice and singing style were frequently compared to another established star, Eleftheria Arvanitaki, she quickly formed her own unique style. In 1989 she collaborated with another star musician, singer and songwriter Nikos Xydakis and, the following year, issued the bestselling album Κορίτσι και γυναίκα (Girl and Woman). Its success was such that it gave impetus to the so-called "modern artistic" style of Greek music which came to the fore in the 1990s and exemplified that era.

== Career as a star performer ==
During the decade, she rose to the top tier of Greek musical performers, with nine albums, from 1990's Κορίτσι και γυναίκα (Girl and Woman) to 1999's Αλλάζει κάθε που βραδιάζει (Changes Descend Every Evening). Among her most popular albums were 1996's Argentinos, followed, two years later, by Dream Era, which includes live recordings from her Ιερά Οδό (Sacred Way) appearances. During 1998–99, she formed a singing partnership with another Greek vocalist, Melina Kana, resulting in 1999's 13 Φεγγάρια (13 Moons). The decade's end signaled changing musical trends and styles, as she released an album featuring bold western pop music and toured the country with concerts in tandem with yet another musical star, Dimitris Basis as well as bands Mode Plagal and, starting in 2007, Mikro, which blended traditional Greek music with jazz, funk and other international styles.

She adapted to the trends of 2000s, while partnering with John Kotsiras (in 2000) and (in 2001) with her husband Giorgos Andreou as well as with Nikos Portokaloglou. In 2002, she performed with Manolis Lidakis and was heard on the soundtrack of writer-directors Thanasis Papathanasiou and Michalis Reppas' 2001 film To klama vgike ap' ton Paradeiso (Crying... Silicon Tears). In 2004, she headlined at Athens Concert Hall, performing the songs of Vassilis Tsitsanis and, during the summer, was seen as a singer and leading the dance as part of the Iphigenia in Aulis staging at Patras Municipal and Regional Theatre.

During 2005 she partnered in a summer tour with actress and singer Tania Tsanaklidou and, her album for that year, Αγαπημένο μου Ημερολόγιο (Dear Diary), was a record of her work with the musical ensemble Εστουδιαντίνα Νέας Ιωνίας (Estoudiantina Neas Ionias) known for traditional interpretations of Greek folk songs, which provided a return to the roots of her initial inspiration and performing style.

In the following years she continued to record albums and perform, such as her 2008 appearances with singers Andriana Babali and Giota Nega and at the "Αποθήκη του Μύλου" performance venue in Thessaloniki, with singer Glykeria, and, at the Polis Theatre with the band Trifono which specializes in tribute concerts of Greek traditional music.

== 2016 performances in the United States ==
On April 22, 2016 she performed in the United States at the Kaye Playhouse in New York City's Hunter College and, the following day, at the Berklee Performance Center in Boston. Accompanied by her band which, in 2015, she gave the new name of Bogaz Musique: Apostolos Tsardakas (kanonaki/tzoura/baglama/vocals), Spyros Chatzikontstantinou (guitars/vocals), Haris Kellaris (bass) and Argyris Diamantis (drums), she presented a 2½-hour show at each venue, performing best-known selections from her personal discography, as well as traditional, classic and rembetika songs, including top hits by Manos Hatzidakis, Mikis Theodorakis and Stavros Xarchakos. She sang specially-written English lyrics to one of her most popular songs, "Diodia".

Presented as part of the Greek Music Journey series by Greek and Cypriot radio and television network, AKTINA, the concerts received sustained publicity among media outlets serving the Northeast's Greek community and included a presentation to Eleni Tsaligopoulou of AKTINA third "Distinguished Artist Award” which honors artists with many years of contribution to Greek music (the previous two recipients were Lavrentis Machairitsas and Yiannis Kotsiras).

== Personal life ==
In a 2008 interview with SigmaLive, she said that her marriage to Greek composer, lyricist, music producer and writer Giorgos Andreou had lasted fifteen years. However, it later ended in divorce.

== Discography ==
- 1986 — Quiet down and Listen
- 1990 — Girl and Woman
- 1992 — Half Moon
- 1993 — Mirrors
- 1996 — Arzedina
- 1998 — Dream Era
- 1999 — Changes Descend Every Evening
- 2001 — Sweet Temptation
- 2002 — Songs for a Summer
- 2003 — Color
- 2005 — Dear Diary
- 2005 — Each End and Beginning
- 2007 — Mad Secret Concerts
- 2008 — Best of / San Lied
- 2009 — In the Dream Season (Sunday Newspaper)
- 2011 — Tarrira
- 2013 — The Love Collection
- 2014 — Together (accompanied by Melina Kana)
- 2015 — Every ending and beginning
- 2015 — Eleni Tsaligopoulou At Lyra
