= Akropol =

1995 film

- Directed by: Pantelis Voulgaris
- Written by: Screenplay: Pantelis Voulgaris
- Starring: Lefteris Voyatzis; Stavros Paravas; Konstantinos Tzoumas; Themis Bazaka; Sotiria Leonardou; Antzela Gerekou; Andigoni Alikakou; Manos Vakousis; Yannis Sampsiaris; Eirini Inglesi; Olga Damani; Popi Papadaki; Despo Diamantidou
- Cinematography: Dinos Katsouridis
- Music by: Composer: Yiorgos Mouzakis
- Distributed by: Alco Films
- Release date: 4 January 1995 (Greece)
- Running time: 125 minutes
- Countries: Italy; Germany; Bulgaria; Greece
- Language: Greek

Akropol (aka Acropole) is a 1995 musical film by Alco Films (with F.F. Film House Ltd, Greek Film Centre and ET 1). It was directed by Pantelis Voulgaris, and was filmed wholly in Sofia, Bulgaria.

== Cast ==
- Lefteris Voyatzis - Lakis Loizos
- Stavros Paravas - Antonis Seferiadis, o Prigipas
- Konstantinos Tzoumas - Platon
- Themis Bazaka - Rena
- Sotiria Leonardou
- Antzela Gerekou - Zozo
- Antigoni Alikakou
- Manos Vakousis - Foteinias
- Yannis Sampsiaris
- Eirini Inglesi
- Olga Damani - Marika
- Popi Papadaki
- Despo Diamantidou - Seferiadou, Antonis's mother
- Lila Moutsopoulou

== Soundtrack ==
This list only contains some of the songs featured in Akropol.

- "Kleise ta matia sou"
  Written by Nikos Portokaloglou
  Performed by Nikos Portokaloglou & Melina Kana
- "Maharagias"
  Written by Nikos Portokaloglou
  Performed by Melina Kana
