= 2003 World Music Awards =

15th award event

The 2003 World Music Awards (15th annual World Music Awards) were held on 12 October 2003 in Monaco. The evening was hosted by Vivica A. Fox, Rupert Everett, and Anna Kournikova. Awards were given based on worldwide sales figures for that year. The big winners of the night were 50 Cent, who took home five awards, and t.A.T.u. with three awards.

== Winners ==
- Pink
- Eminem
- Robbie Williams
- Samira Said
- Dido
- Avril Lavigne
- Do
- Patrick Bruel
- Lorie
- Yannis Kotsiras
- Eros Ramazzotti
- Laura Pausini
- Panjabi MC
- Ronan Keating
- Enya
- Herbert Grönemeyer
- Roxette
- DJ Bobo

== Chopard Diamond Award ==
The Chopard Diamond Award (or simply the Diamond Award) was given by the World Music Awards to artists who had sold over 100 million albums during their career. This award was occasionally confused with the previously created RIAA certification of "Diamond", which represents the sale of over ten million copies of an album in the USA and was created in 1999, whereas the Chopard Diamond award was created in 2001.

- Mariah Carey

== Legend Award ==
- Chaka Khan
- George Benson

== Act of 2003 ==
- World's Best-Selling Artist of the Year: 50 Cent

== Pop ==
- World's Best-Selling Pop Male Artist: 50 Cent
- World's Best-Selling Pop Female Artist: Norah Jones
- World's Best-Selling Pop Group Artist: t.A.T.u.

== Pop/Rock ==
- World's Best-Selling Pop/Rock Artist: Eminem

== Rock ==
- World's Best-Selling Rock Group: Linkin Park

== Dance ==
- World's Best-Selling Dance Artist: Justin Timberlake
- World's Best-Selling Dance Group: t.A.T.u.

== Adult ==
- World's Best-Selling Adult Contemporary Artist: Norah Jones

== R&B ==
- World's Best-Selling R&B Artist: 50 Cent

== Rap/Hip-Hop ==
- World's Best-Selling Rap/Hip-Hop Artist: 50 Cent

== Latin ==
- World's Best-Selling Latin Female Artist: Shakira
- World's Best-Selling Latin Male Artist: David Bisbal

== Duo ==
- World's Best-Selling Duo: t.A.T.u.

== New ==
- World's Best-Selling New Artist: 50 Cent

== National Awards ==
- World's Best-Selling American Female Artist: Pink
- World's Best-Selling American Male Artist: Eminem
- World's Best-Selling British Male Artist: Robbie Williams
- World's Best-Selling British Female Artist: Dido
- World's Best-Selling Canadian Artist: Avril Lavigne
- World's Best-Selling Chinese Artist ：Nicholas Tse
- World's Best-Selling Dutch Artist: Do
- World's Best-Selling French Male Artist: Patrick Bruel
- World's Best-Selling French Female Artist: Lorie
- World's Best-Selling German Artist: Herbert Grönemeyer
- World's Best-Selling Greek Artist: Yannis Kotsiras
- World's Best-Selling Italian Male Artist: Eros Ramazzotti
- World's Best-Selling Italian Female Artist: Laura Pausini
- World's Best-Selling Indian Artist: Panjabi MC
- World's Best-Selling Irish Male Artist: Ronan Keating
- World's Best-Selling Irish Female Artist: Enya
- World's Best-Selling Middle Eastern Artist: Samira Said
- World's Best-Selling Scandinavian Artist: Roxette
- World's Best-Selling Swiss Artist: DJ Bobo
