= Elena Maroulleti =

Greek Cypriot American independent journalist

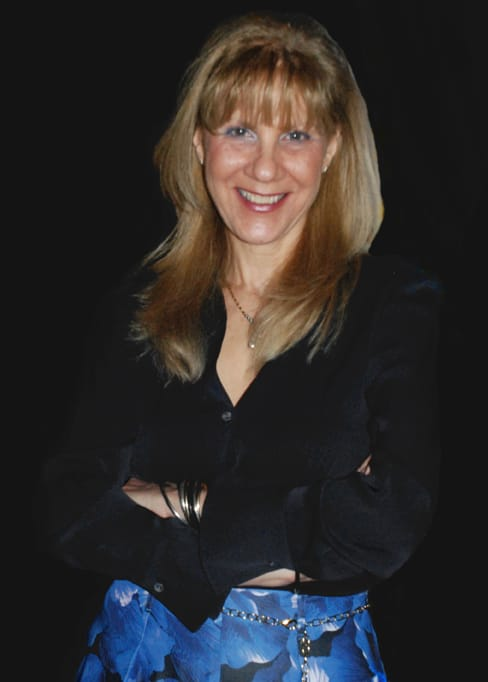
- Maroulleti in 2015
- Known for: AKTINA FM

Elena Maroulleti is a Greek Cypriot American independent journalist/reporter and founder of AKTINA FM, the second Internet radio streaming online to emerge in the world and of AKTINA TV, the first English language Greek American TV show established in New York. She is the founder and President of the New York-based non-profit and tax-exempt cultural organizations, AKTINA Productions, Inc., and CYPRECO of America, Inc.

== Education ==
Maroulleti comes from the town Varosha of the coastal city of Famagusta, Cyprus. She studied at the London College of Secretaries and later at the Fashion Institute of Technology in New York through a scholarship from her employer American Broadcasting Company (ABC).

== Career ==
Maroulleti worked at Teachers Insurance and Annuity Association in the Annuity Department and at ABC in the Personnel Department and the News Department. She has produced for AKTINA TV over 100 mini documentaries and stories on the cultures, history and ancient sites of Cyprus and Greece and about the Greek American and Greek Cypriot American community.

In 1993, she founded and established AKTINA FM, the first Greek American radio outlet to introduce online streaming and the second online Internet Radio to emerge in the world.

In 2002, she founded and established AKTINA TV, the first and only English-language Greek American Television program available in New York on a local channel (WNYE Channel 25).

In October 2023, Maroulleti was honored as “Personality of the Year” by the international magazine Yessiey at the Yessiey Award 2023” which celebrated women “Innovators and Change-Makers.”
