= Realtime (C:Real album) =

Studio album by C:Real
- Released: 1997
- Genre: Pop, Dance, Rock
- Length: 58:50
- Language: English
- Label: Sony/Dance Pool

C:Real chronology
Realtime (1997)	Stop Killing Time (2000)

Realtime is the debut album of the Greek musical group C:Real. The album was released on the Dance Pool label, a subsidiary of Sony Music, and released in 1997 in Greece and Cyprus by Sony Music Greece. Remixes of the singles were included on various releases by Dance Pool, particularly on DJ promos, throughout Europe.

== Track listing ==
1. "31 Seconds" – 4:06
2. "Visions Of You" (ft Sarah Jane Morris) – 4:06
3. "Desire" – 4:26
4. "Out of Time" – 4:17
5. "Tears in My Eyes" (Ah Na To Les) – 5:06
6. "A New Religion" – 5:08
7. "I Don't Know" – 4:36
8. "Why Me?" – 3:59
9. "I Stand Alone" – 4:03
10. "Gimme Love" – 4:45
11. "Words" – 4:39
12. "Visions Of You" (Drum & Bass Version) – 4:40
13. "El Ritmo" – 3:59

== Singles ==
"A New Religion"

"A New Religion" was the first single from the album and it was released in 1996 as a 4 track Maxi single.
