= Krimmena Mistika =

Studio album by Giannis Ploutarhos
- Released: 2006
- Label: Minos EMI

Giannis Ploutarhos chronology
Ola Se Sena Ta Vrika (2005)	Krimmena Mistika (2006)	O,ti Genniete Stin Psihi (2008)

Krimmena Mistika (Greek: Κρυμμένα Μυστικά; English: Hidden Secrets) is an album by Greek musician Giannis Ploutarhos, released in 2006 by Minos EMI.

== Track listing ==
No.	Title	Length
1.	"Den Ime Theos" (I Am Not God)
2.	"Ma Pou Na to Po" (Who To Talk To)
3.	"Egkatalipsi" (Abandonment)
4.	"Ola Itan Psemata" (Was All Lies)
5.	"Afieromeno" (Dedicated)
6.	"Den Ine Tora Pia Edo" (She's Not Here Anymore)
7.	"Enas Andras Pou Agapouse Dihos Oria" (A Man Who Loved Unlimitedly)
8.	"Xero Pos Se Hano" (I Know I'm Losing You)
9.	"Me Ti Kardia" (On What Heart)
10.	"H Zilia Sou" (My Jealousy)
11.	"Tora Pou Efiges" (Now That You're Gone)
12.	"Palioharaktiras" (Bad Character)
13.	"Ilie Mou an Ti Dis" (If You See Her My Sun)
14.	"Stin Poli Akrogialia" (Waterfront in the City)
15.	"Na Mi M'Afisis" (Don't Leave Me)
16.	"Poso Fovame" (I'm Afraid So)
