= Kathe Mou Skepsi =

2006 album by Greek musical group C:Real

Kathe Mou Skepsi Κάθε Μου Σκέψη

Studio album by C:Real
- Released: 22 September 2006
- Recorded: 2005–2006
- Genre: Pop rock
- Language: Greek, English
- Label: Sony BMG/Epic
- Producer: Dakis Damaschis, Takis Retsinas, Giannis Spanos, Irini Douka

C:Real chronology
Hilia Hronia (2004)	Kathe Mou Skepsi; Κάθε Μου Σκέψη (2006)	Invain (2008)

Singles from Kathe Mou Skepsi
- 1. "Epikindina Se Thelo" Released: 2006; 2. "Kathe Mou Skepsi" Released: 2007; 3. "A Slice of Heaven" Released: 2007

Kathe Mou Skepsi (Greek: Κάθε Μου Σκέψη; English: My every thought) is the fifth studio album by Greek musical group C:Real. The album was released in 2006 in Greece and Cyprus by Sony BMG Greece and is their most successful album to date.

== Track listing ==
1. "Epikindina Se Thelo" (Dangerously I want you)
2. "Simera Vradi" (This afternoon)
3. "Moni Tis" (Only her)
4. "Kathe Mou Skepsi" (Each thought of mine)
5. "Sonar"
6. "Kiklonas" (Cyclone)
7. "Tha Mai Panda Edo" (I'll be ever here)
8. "To Mystirio" (The mystery)
9. "Meine Dipla Mou"
10. "Mono Esy" (Only you)
11. "A Slice of Heaven"
12. "Epikindina Se Thelo" (Video) (Dangerously I want you)
13. "Meine Dipla Mou" (Video)
14. "A Slice of Heaven" (Live Mix Video)
15. "Straight Story" (Movie Trailer)

== Singles ==
"Epikindina Se Thelo"

The first single from the album was "Epikindina Se Thelo" and became the group's biggest hit to date. The music video was directed by Efi Mouriki and Vladimiros Kiriakidis and was well-received, with it centering around the LGBT subculture and was based on the idea of the role reversal of homosexuality being considered the social norm. The song was also the main theme song of the Kiriakidis film Straight Story which also focused on these issues.

"Kathe Mou Skepsi"

The second single was "Kathe Mou Skepsi." The music video was directed by Manolis Tzirakis.

"A Slice of Heaven"

The last single from the album was "A Slice of Heaven". The music video was once again directed by Manos Spiridakis.

== Awards ==
=== 4th Arion Music Awards ===
- Best Pop Album (nominated)
- Best Pop Song ("Epikindina Se Thelo") (nominated)
- Best Alternative Song ("Kathe Mou Skepsi") (nominated)
- Video of the Year ("Epikindina Se Thelo") (nominated)
- Group of the Year

=== MAD Video Music Awards 2005 ===
- Best Rock Video ("Epikindina Se Thelo")
- Best Video by a Group ("Epikindina Se Thelo")
- Video of the Year (nominated)
