= Stop Killing Time =

Studio album by C:Real
- Released: October 2000
- Genre: Pop, Dance, electronic
- Length: 51:27
- Language: English
- Label: LoCal-Planetworks

C:Real chronology
| Realtime (1997) | Stop Killing Time (2000) | Ta Pio Megala S'agapo (2003) |

Stop Killing Time is the second studio album by Greek musical group C:Real. The album was released October 2000 by LoCal-Planetworks.

== Track listing ==
1. "With or Without You" – 4:26
2. "Stop Killing Time" – 4:24
3. "My Finest Symphony" – 4:39
4. "Feelings" (ft Tania Nassibian) – 3:51
5. "Thinking of You" (ft Sofia Strati) – 4:23
6. "Strange Emotions" – 3:31
7. "It's No Surprise" – 4:41
8. "Hypnotized" – 4:24
9. "How Can I pretend" – 3:48
10. "A Quiet Sunday Night" – 4:10
11. "Fire" – 4:19
12. "Stop Killing Time" (Unplugged) – 4:51

== Singles ==
"With or Without You"

"With or Without You" was the first single from the album and was released in December 1999 as a 4 track CD single. It is considered one of C:Real's major successes, charting on the IFPI singles chart for over 18 weeks and achieving Gold certification.

"Thinking of You"

"Thinking of You" was the second single from the album and was released in mid-2000. It was released as a CD single and contained 3 versions of the song. The song is described as being a latin sounding track with vocals by Sofia Strati.

"Stop Killing Time"

"Stop Killing Time" was the third single released from the album. The song features vocals by Sofia Rapti.
