= Ipirhan Orki =

Ipirhan Orki Υπήρχαν Όρκοι

Studio album by Giannis Ploutarhos
- Released: March 22, 2000
- Recorded: 2000
- Genre: Laïka
- Length: 53:23
- Label: EMI
- Producer: Giannis Ploutarhos, Vasilis Kelaïdis, Spiros Georgiou, Giorgos Kafetzopoulos, Dimitris Kordatzis, Giannis Kourkoumelis, Konstantinos Pantzis, Panos Falaras, Nikos Vaxavanelis, Natali, Ilias Filippou, Evi Droutsa

Giannis Ploutarhos chronology
Mono Esy (1999)	Ipirhan Orki; Υπήρχαν Όρκοι (2000)	Mikres Fotografies (2001)

Ipirhan Orki (Greek: Υπήρχαν Όρκοι; English: There were vows) is the second studio album by Greek musician Giannis Ploutarhos, released on March 22, 2000, by Minos EMI in Greece and Cyprus. This was the first album where Ploutarhos contributed musically. The album was certified double Platinum by the IFPI Greece for sales of at least 80,000 copies, becoming his first album to be certified in Greece and making it his joint third most successful album there.

== Track listing ==
No.	Title	Length
1.	"Fysai Poli" (It is blowing harshly)	4:01
2.	"Hartini Kardia" (Paper Heart)	3:30
3.	"To Kalitero Paidi" (The best guy)	3:54
4.	"Ipirhan Orki" (Whatever you say to me)	3:03
5.	"As'Tine Na Figi" (Let her leave)	2:51
6.	"Paramilao" (I am talking too much)	3:39
7.	"Ego O Giannis" (I, Giannis)	4:41
8.	"Tha Piso Tin Kardia Mou" (I will my heart)	4:22
9.	"Siga Siga" (Slowly)	3:33
10.	"Nihta Irthes" (Night you came)	3:34
11.	"Ena Mandili" (A headscarf)	3:39
12.	"Meno Ki Epimeno" (I stay and I insist)	4:09
13.	"Mono Ego S'agapao" (Only I love you)	3:12
14.	"Se Hano" (I am losing you)	2:59
15.	"Se Xeperasa" (I got over you)	4:56

== Singles ==
"Ipirhan Orki"

The first single from the album was "Ipirhan Orki", which was composed by Ploutarhos himself with lyrics by Natali. The music video was directed by Kostas Kapetanidis.

"Fysai Poli"

The second single from the album was "Fysai Poli". The music video was directed by Kostas Kapetanidis and features Ploutarhos and a woman on the beach.

"Paramilao"

The second single from the album was "Paramilao". The music video was directed by Kostas Kapetanidis and features Ploutarhos on a city rooftop.

"Se Xeperasa"

The fourth single from the album was "Se Xeperasa". No music video was made to accompany the single.

"Se Hano"

The fifth single from the album was "Se Hano". No music video was made to accompany the single.

"To Kalitero Paidi"

The fifth single from the album was "To Kalitero Paidi". The music video was directed by Kostas Kapetanidis and features Ploutarhos on top of a cliff.

"Siga Siga"

The last single from the album was "Siga Siga". There was no music video accompanying the single.

== Chart performance ==
Chart	Providers	Peak position	Certification	Sales
Greek Albums Chart	IFPI Greece	1	Platinum	80,000
Cypriot Albums Chart	Musical Paradise	1		
