= Olga Damani =

Greek actress (born 1943)

- Όλγα Δαμάνη
- Born: 17 November 1943 (age 82); Athens, Greece
- Occupation: actress

Olga Damani (Greek: Όλγα Δαμάνη; born 17 November 1943) is a Greek actress with an extensive trajectory in her country and in some productions abroad.

== Career ==
Damani was born in Athens on 17 November 1943 and graduated from the School of Theater in 1975. Between that year and 1985, she continued working with the institute in numerous roles in plays, later working in the late 1980s and throughout the 1990s at the National Theatre. Damani also worked independently in the stage field and later moved to acting in television series and in the cinematographic industry.

She has credited his vocation to people who urged her to take up acting after knowing of her capabilities, including actor Manos Katrakis and actress Katina Paxinou. Before her professional career in entertainment, Damani worked in a law firm and had held other jobs like telephone operator and typist.

Among her most known roles in cinema, Damani took part in the cast of Akropol (1995), Brides (2004), Adults in the Room (2019) and the Norwegian production Handling the Undead (2024).

== Personal life ==
Damani stated in an interview that she was engaged at the age of 19 but that her dedication to work never allowed her to marry. She also said that Greek industry was thriving and that she wanted to perform in big roles in classical works.
