= Mono Esi =

Mono Esi Μόνο Εσύ

Studio album by Giannis Ploutarhos
- Released: January 10, 1999
- Recorded: 1998–1999
- Genre: Laïka
- Length: 49:03
- Label: EMI
- Producers: Christos Nikolopoulos, Alekos Chrisovergis

Giannis Ploutarhos chronology
Mono Esi; Μόνο Εσύ (1999)	Ipirhan Orki (2000)

Singles from Mono Esi
- 1. "Enas Theos" Released: 1998; 2. "Mono Esi" Released: January 1999

Mono Esi (Greek: Μόνο Εσύ; English: Only you) is the debut album by Greek musician Giannis Ploutarhos, released in 1999 by Minos EMI in Greece and Cyprus. The songs "Enas Theos", "O,ti Ki An Mou Les", and "Mipos Ertheis" were previously released on the artist's self-titled debut EP.

== Track listing ==
No.	Title	Length
1.	"Mipos Ertheis" (Perhaps you will come)	3:37
2.	"Mono Esi" (Only you)	3:44
3.	"Milas" (You speak)	3:39
4.	"O,ti Ki An Mou Les" (Whatever you say t6o me)	3:23
5.	"Zo" (I live)	3:01
6.	"Den Ipoferese" (You don't suffer)	3:59
7.	"Fotia Ki Agapi" (Fire and love)	3:54
8.	"Den Epistrefi I Agapi" (Love does not return)	3:38
9.	"Enas Theos" (A God)	3:47
10.	"Nihtes Apo Krystala" (Nights made of crystals)	3:37
11.	"Se Kouvalao Pandou" (I take you with me everywhere)	3:04
12.	"Kalitera Makria Sou" (Better be far away from you)	3:19
13.	"Eheis Gini Aisthisi" (You have become a sense)	3:30
14.	"Ta Gerakisia Matia Mou" (My old eyes)	3:33
15.	"Kai Den Boro" (And I can't)	2:38

== Singles ==
"Enas Theos"

The first single from the album was "Enas Theos", which was released on the Giannis Ploutarhos EP. It was composed by Alekos Chrisovergis with lyrics by Spiros Giatras.

"Mono Esi"

The second single from the album was "Mono Esi."
