= Hilia Hronia =

Hilia Hronia Χίλια Χρόνια

Studio album by C:Real
- Released: 2004
- Recorded: 2004
- Genre: Pop rock
- Language: Greek, English
- Label: Sony BMG/Epic

C:Real chronology
Ta Pio Megala S'agapo (2003)	Hilia Hronia; Χίλια Χρόνια (2004)	Kathe Mou Skepsi (2006)

Singles from Hilia Hronia
- 1. "Etsi M'aresi Na Zo" Released: 2004; 2. "Meine Dipla Mou" Released: 2004; 3. "Min Anisiheis" Released: 2004

Hilia Hronia (Greek: Χίλια Χρόνια; English: A thousand years) is the name of the fourth studio album by Greek musical group C:Real. The album was released in 2004 by Sony BMG Greece in Greece and Cyprus.

== Track listing ==
1. "Etsi M'aresi Na Zo" (That's how I like to live)
2. "Meine Dipla Mou" (Stay beside me)
3. "Thelo Na Ksereis" (I want you to know)
4. "Min Anisiheis" (Don't worry)
5. "Hilia Hronia" (A thousand years)
6. "Stasou" (Stay)
7. "Kathe Mikro Sou Psema" (Every one of your little lies)
8. "Stou Kosmou Aftou Tin Akri" (To the end of this world)
9. "Mipos Gi'Afto" (Perhaps because of this)
10. "Etsi Kanoun I Kardies" (That's what hearts do)
11. "An Den Se Ksanado" (If I don't see you again)
12. "Fire in the Sky"
13. "Kalokairi Stin Kardia" (Summer in the heart)
14. "Thelo Na Ksereis (Club Mix)" (I want you to know)

== Singles ==
"Etsi M'aresi Na Zo"

The first single from the album was "Etsi M'aresei Na Zo". The music video was directed by Lakis Matthiopoulos.

"Meine Dipla Mou"

The second single was "Meine Dipla Mou". The music video was directed by Manos Spiridakis.

"Min Anisiheis"

The last single from the album was "Min Anisiheis". The music video was once again directed by Manos Spiridakis.

== Awards ==
=== 3rd Arion Music Awards ===
- Best Pop Group

=== MAD Video Music Awards 2005 ===
- Best Dressed Artist in a Video (Irini Douka – "Min Anisiheis")

=== MAD Video Music Awards 2006 ===
- Best Video by a Group ("Etsi M'aresi Na Zo")
