= Pai Ligos Kairos =

Studio album by Giannis Ploutarhos
- Released: 2004
- Length: 1:10:28
- Label: EMI

Giannis Ploutarhos chronology
Den Einai O Erotas...Paidi Tis Logikis (2003)	Pai Ligos Kairos (2004)	Ola Se Sena Ta Vrika (2005)

Pai Ligos Kairos is an album by Greek singer Giannis Ploutarhos, released in 2004 by EMI.

== Track listing ==
No.	Title	Length
1.	"Apopse Gnorise Me"	3:37
2.	"Panselinos"	3:13
3.	"Paei Ligo Kairos"	4:00
4.	"Pos Na Ginoume Kseni"	3:20
5.	"Pou Na Se Tora"	3:04
6.	"To Gramma"	3:59
7.	"Sinidisi Mou"	3:01
8.	"Mono Esi"	3:49
9.	"Pos Boro Na Se Ksehaso"	4:17
10.	"Otan Tha Figis"	4:16
11.	"Hroma Tis Zois"	3:54
12.	"Pes Mou Giati Melagxoleis"	3:18
13.	"Klino Arga Ta Vlefara Mou"	2:58
14.	"Na Me Thimase Dinato"	3:20
15.	"Kardia Mou Pios"	3:42
16.	"Strofi Kalokeriou"	3:18
17.	"Min Afinis Edo"	3:50
18.	"To Poukamiso"	3:21
19.	"Giati Eisai Ola Ayta Pou Den Boro Na Po"	3:49
