= Invain =

2008 album by Greek musical group C:Real

Studio album by C:Real
- Released: 31 March 2008
- Recorded: 2007–2008
- Genre: Pop, Rock
- Length: 37:38
- Language: Greek, English
- Label: Heaven

C:Real chronology
Kathe Mou Skepsi (2006)	Invain (2008)

Invain (Greek: Ινβάιν) is the name of the sixth studio album by Greek musical group C:Real. The album was released on 31 March 2008 and is C:Real's first release after signing with Heaven Music. It contains ten tracks: seven in Greek and three in English.

== Promotion ==
On April 2, 2008, it was performed live at club "Fuzz". The evening was organized by Germanos, Sony Ericsson and Heaven Live. C:Real also planned a three-month tour of Greece for summer 2008 starting on June 7 and continuing through September 17. The tour focused on Invain, but they sang songs from their older albums as well.

== Critical reception ==
Professional ratings
Review scores
Source	Rating
Avopolis	3/5 stars

Greek music review website Avopolis gave the album three stars, a "good" rating. They noted that the album is a change in style from C:Real's previous albums, moving from electronic and pop rock to gothic and hard rock tinged pop songs.

== Track listing ==
1. "Mia Foni" (Invain) – 3:44
2. "Koita Me Ligo" – 3:15
3. "Ksehase To" – 3:54
4. "Einai Kati Meres" – 4:28
5. "Stop in the Name of Love" – 2:58
6. "Thelo Na Se Eho" – 3:57
7. "An Eisai Esi" – 3:49
8. "Kommatia" – 4:06
9. "When You Call Me Baby" – 3:39
10. "Just Forget It" – 3:54

== Singles ==
"Ksehase To"

"Ksehase To" is the first single from the album. It was released in February as a radio single at the same time that C:Real announced signing to Heaven Music. A music video of the song was made and is described as being "cartoonish".

== Charts ==
The album made its debut on the IFPI Greek Albums Chart at number seven on week 15/2008. The following week, it advanced one spot to number six, its peak, before returning to seven for another week. In the two weeks after, it sank to number 32, then 39, before leaving the chart after having charted for five straight weeks. Invain also made an appearance on the Cypriot Albums Chart where it peaked at number five.

Chart	Peak position
Greece (IFPI)	6
Cyprus (Musical Paradise Top 10)	5
