= Yannis Ploutarchos =

Greek singer and songwriter (born 1970)

Yannis Ploutarchos Γιάννης Πλούταρχος
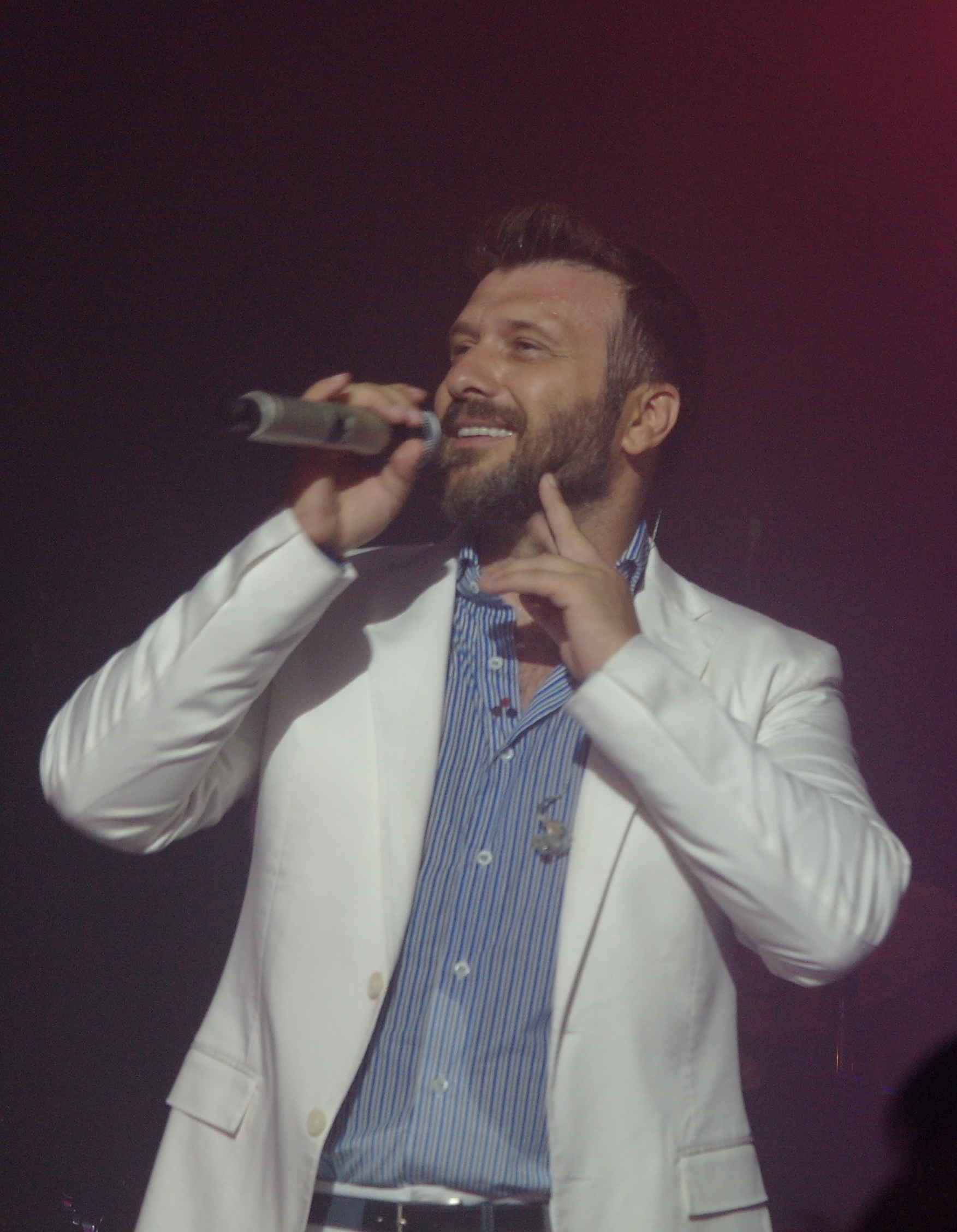

Background information
- Born: Yannis Kakossaios; 18 December 1970 (age 55); Mavrogeia, Kingdom of Greece
- Genres: Contemporary laïko, Pop,
- Occupations: Singer, songwriter
- Years active: 1998–present
- Labels: Minos EMI (1998–2010, 2014–2015); Heaven Music (2010–2013, 2015–present)

Yannis Ploutarchos (Greek: Γιάννης Πλούταρχος, pronounced [ˌʝanis ˈplutarxos]; born 18 December 1970) is a Greek singer and songwriter. He is considered one of the most popular laïko singers of his time, and has been characterized with having a genuine laïko voice. To date, he has released 14 studio albums along with one greatest hits album.

== Early life ==
Ploutarchos was born Yannis Kakossaios on 18 December 1970 in the small village of Mavrogia, near Orchomenos. Ploutarchos comes from a poor rural family, which long struggled to make ends meet.

He first started singing at age six, while his whole family would sing while working to get through the day. His first musical influences came from Dimotiká and traditional Byzantine music. He lived there until age 16, at which point he decided to move to Athens to pursue his dream of becoming a singer. He had told his family he wanted to move the Athens to study hairdressing.

Once in Athens, Ploutarchos began working during the day at a hair salon while singing at clubs at night. His first gig was at a small club in Korydallos. Disappointed by the prevailing conditions in the music business, he abandoned singing twice and pursued other occupations to support himself.

Despite previous disappointments, Ploutarchos' love of music pushed him back into the business and just two years after his first performance, he started appearing at club Rodolfo, which was followed by appearances at bigger clubs such as Neraida, Fantasia, and Tonel where he collaborated with well-known laïka names such as Giannis Poulopoulos, Rita Sakellariou, Themis Adamantidis, as well as Contemporary laïka artists such as Stelios Rokkos and Giorgos Mazonakis. Around that time, he met Dimitris Kardatzis and Ilias Filippou who believed in his talent, and got him in touch with his first producer Girgos Makrakis, who is credited with inspiring his stage last name "Ploutarchos".

== Career ==
=== 1998–2004: debut and early success ===
In late 1998, Ploutarchos signed with Minos EMI and shortly after released his debut album titled Mono Esi (Only you), which received moderate success. From the album, "Enas Theos" (One god) became a hit, which is still considered one of his most popular songs to date. After his first album, he was featured in a duet titled "I Kardia Mou Einai Zalismeni" (My heart is dazed) with Konstantina on her album Simeio Epafis, while he was also featured in a duet with Stelios Dionysiou on the song "Orestiada" from his album Epivalletai. In 2000, he released his second album titled Ipirhan Orki (There were promises), which featured a number of hits. The album was certified gold, making him widely known and catapulting his career to new heights, and eventually leading sales to platinum status. A year later in 2001 he released his third album titled Mikres Fotografies (Small pictures), which sold over 150,000 units, and included a number of songs written by himself. At the 2002 Arion Music Awards, Ploutarchos received five awards, including "Singer of the year", "Best laiko singer", as well as "Album of the year", "Best laiko album", and "Best video-clip" for his album Mikres Fotografies and songs off of it.

In 2002, he released his fourth studio album titled Den Einai O Erotas...Paidi Tis Logikis (Love is not....a child of logic) which was later re-released in 2003 with the inclusion of bonus tracks and a DVD. The album was eventually certified 3× platinum. That same year in 2003, Ploutarchos released his fifth studio album Pai Ligos Kairos (Some time has passed by...), which was also certified 3× platinum. The album was re-released in 2004 with the inclusion of a bonus song, a cover of the popular song "An Thimitheis T' Oneiro Mou" by Mikis Theodorakis. At the same time, Ploutarchos broke records for continuous appearances at a venue, appearing at club Poseidonio as part of a concert series for one whole calendar year without interruption.

=== 2005–2010: further success ===
In 2005, Ploutarchos embarked on his first world tour, with shows in Toronto, Atlantic City, Boston, New York City, Chicago, Melbourne, Sydney, Johannesburg, and Nicosia. Upon return to Greece, he released his sixth studio album titled Ola Se Sena Ta Vrika (I've found it all in you), which was a commercial success. The album was eventually certified 2× platinum.

On 18 September 2006, he released his seventh studio album titled Krimmena Mistika (Hidden secrets), which sold more than 40,000 units and was certified Platinum in its first week. The album was also released in a special edition form with the inclusion of a bonus DVD, while few days later on 20 September, Ploutarchos began appearances at club Kentro Athinon. The album, which also featured a duet with Kostantina titled "Ti Bike Anamesa Mas;" (What came between us?), was eventually certified 2× platinum.

A greatest hits album titled Stigmes (Moments) followed in 2007, which included six new songs and a bonus DVD. The album was eventually certified Platinum, exceeding sales of 40,000 units. In October 2007, Ploutarchos embarked on a mini US tour, performing in Toronto, New York, Montreal, and Foxwoods. Upon his return to Greece, Ploutarchos started appearing in a concert series at club Kentro Athinon alongside Apostolia Zoi, Tamta and Giannis Vardis on 25 October.

In June 2008, Ploutarchos released his eight studio album titled O,ti Gennietai Stin Psihi (Whatever is born in the soul), which was also certified 2× platinum. On 17 July, he started appearances at club Politeia in Thessaloniki. In December 2008, he started appearances at club REX. A few days later on 22 December 2008, Plourahos performed a charity concert for children with disabilities at club REX. In May 2009, Ploutarchos traveled to Australia to perform two charity concerts in Sydney and Melbourne. That summer, Ploutarchos partnered with MAD Greekz and embarked on his first major tour around Greece. In October of the same year, Ploutarchos held concerts in London and Cyprus. He continued touring, and in January 2010, toured North American performing in Vancouver, Foxwoods, Montreal, Atlantic City, Chicago, Toronto, and Sacramento.

On 22 March 2010, Ploutarchos released his ninth studio album titled Prosopika Dedomena. The album was released in record stores and at Newsstands, and quickly sold out forcing his label to reissued the album. It was eventually certified 6× platinum. In April of the same year, he started appearing at club ACRO, while for the winter season 2010–2011 he started performing at club CosmoStage.

=== 2011–present: new label & projects ===
In December 2010, Ploutarchos left his longtime label Minos EMI, and signed with Heaven Music. Shortly after, he announced a joint project with famous Italian singer Albano Carrisi. On 24 January 2011, their first single titled "Me Mia Matia/Felicita" (With one look/Happiness) was released to radio stations, featuring verses in both Greek and Italian. On 6 February 2011, Ploutarchos released a joint album with Al Bano Carrisi titled Dio Fones-Mia Psihi (Two Voices-One Soul) in Greece as a covermount with Proto Thema. Proto Thema sold over 160,000 copies, selling out completely in just a few hours. A standard retail released followed on 7 February 2011, with two bonus songs included. On 17 February 2011, Ploutarchos took part in the Sanremo Music Festival alongside Albano Carrisi and Greek operatic soprano Dimitra Theodossiou. The trio performed a famous chorus piece titled "Va, pensiero" from the opera Nabucco written by Giuseppe Verdi. Ploutarchos' appearance mark the first time a Greek singer has ever performed at Sanremo Music Festival.

On 22 November 2011, Ploutarchos released his eleventh studio album titled I Dinami Tou Erota (The Strength of Love).

As of February 24, 2021, he is one of the four judges of House of Fame.

== Personal life ==
As of 2022, Ploutarchos and his wife have been together for 34 years, and have five children together.

== Discography ==
=== Studio albums ===
Year	Title	Certification
1998	Mono Esi	–
2000	Ipirhan Orki	Platinum
2001	Mikres Fotografies	3× Platinum
2003	Den Einai O Erotas...Paidi Tis Logikis	3× Platinum
2004	Pai Ligos Kairos	3× Platinum
2005	Ola Se Sena Ta Vrika	2× Platinum
2006	Krimmena Mistika	2× Platinum
2008	O,ti Genniete Stin Psihi	2× Platinum
2010	Prosopika Dedomena	6× Platinum
2011	Dio Fones – Mia Psihi	15× Platinum
2011	I Dinami Tou Erota	2× Platinum
2013	Kato Apo Ton Idio Ilio	3× Platinum
2014	O Anthropos Sou	Platinum
2016	Thema Hronou	Platinum
2017	Pera Ap' Ta Matia Mou	2× Platinum

=== Compilations ===
Year	Title	Certification	
Year	Title	Certification	Ref.
2007	Stigmes	Platinum	
