= Ola Se Sena Ta Vrika =

Studio album by Giannis Ploutarhos
- Released: 2005
- Length: 57:15
- Label: Minos EMI

Giannis Ploutarhos chronology
Pai Ligos Kairos (2004)	Ola Se Sena Ta Vrika (2005)	Krimmena Mistika (2006)

Ola Se Sena Ta Vrika is an album by Greek singer Giannis Ploutarhos, released in 2005 by Minos EMI.

== Track listing ==
No.	Title	Length
1.	"Giati Ehis Figi"	4:22
2.	"Ola Se Sena Ta Vrika"	4:40
3.	"Leptomeries"	4:46
4.	"Tha Ta Spaso Ola"	4:48
5.	"1000"	3:37
6.	"Tha Se Perimeno"	3:59
7.	"Egoismos"	3:40
8.	"I Aftokatastrofi Sou"	4:15
9.	"Kapou Anamesa Sto Psema"	4:01
10.	"Dose Mou To Tsigaro Sou"	3:48
11.	"Agapi Mou Ti Eftexe?"	2:48
12.	"Den Iparho Pia"	4:31
13.	"O Pikramenos Anthropos"	4:00
14.	"Kalispera Monaxia Mou"	4:32
