= Monsieur Minimal =

- Born: Christos Tsitroudis; October 24, 1980; Giannitsa, Greece
- Genres: Indie pop, electronica
- Occupations: Musician, composer, songwriter, singer, guitar player

Christos Tsitroudis (Greek: Χρήστος Τσιτρούδης), stage name Monsieur Minimal is a Greek indie pop music composer and interpreter as well as a guitar player. He first became known with his singles “Silk” and “Love is a circle” which he performed in 2007 during the Coca-Cola Sound Wave Festival. He has since released three albums.

== Early life ==
Monsieur Minimal was born on October 24, 1980 in Gianitsa, Northern Greece, where he grew up. He has since lived in several parts of Greece. He has been living in Athens since 2009. He grew hearing and playing music with several adolescent bands. After high school he studied and graduated from the Department of Electrical Engineering of Kavala's Institute of Technology. He entered music for good when he started studying music technology and production at the music school of Salonica under the guidance of Demetrius Adam. He has been writing music as Monsieur Minimal since 2007.

== Career ==
His first public appearance was in 2007. He was one of the most successful competitors of the Coca-Cola Sound Wave Festival, with his songs Silk and Love Is A Circle. His first official release was in the City Campers compilation (The Sound Of Everything) in 2008.

=== First Album ===
Monsieur Minimal's debut album, titled ’’Lollipop’’, was released in 2008 by The Sound Of Everything Records and received impressive reviews from press and radio, while it soon became a best seller of the Greek indie scene. His music, defined mainly as indie pop but with a lot of electronic influences and elements, expressed through simple, beautiful melodies and sweet pop vocals, made this album a hit across a wide range of radio stations in Greece. Following the hype from his album, Status magazine, one of the most popular male magazines in Greece, included him in its annual contest as a candidate in the category “face of the year 2009”. After the massive exposure he gets from most of the Greek Radio and TV stations, the first international breakthrough comes thanks to a TV ad! “Smile” one of the most popular singles of the album, is selected by Safeway, the third largest supermarket chainstores in USA and Canada for their official TV campaign. The album gets the attention of international music blogs and soon tracks from the album “travel” to France, Germany, Italy while “Love Story” becomes a massive radio hit in Turkey. Citroen also used the song “Smile” for their TV campaign in Greece.

=== Second Album ===
Following the success of the debut album and the unprecedented hype he receives from the Greek media as a new talent, the National Greek Tourism Organization selects the track “Lollipop” for their international campaign consisting of 12 promotional videos in several languages. In 2010 Monsieur Minimal records his second album, titled “Pasta Flora” in Greek. His music preserves the same successful ingredients and the lyrics convey the same meaning: Love! Dimitra Galani, one of the greatest female singers of Greece with a career spanning more than 30 years in the music industry, sings one of the album songs titled “Mia Zoi”. The album becomes an instant success in Greece and Monsieur Minimal now enjoys popularity from a much wider audience in his home country, while receiving a daily airplay for the biggest music radio stations of Greece.

=== Third Album ===
2012 finds Monsieur Minimal writing new songs for his third album “Minimal to Maximal”, which is in English again, just like his debut album Lollipop. The first small but intriguing taste of the musical puzzle of the third album, came with the "Digital Love EP" (released in May 2012), including four new and previously unreleased tracks, including the hit single "Bitter" (Bitter Official Video) in collaboration with Hiras . Minimal to Maximal includes 16 tracks in total, featuring all 4 tracks of the “Digital Love EP”, and divided in two parts. The first part (Minimal) contains 8 tracks with melodic and uptempo pop music blended with electronic elements but also new wave and rock influences from the 80s and 90s. The second part (Maximal) contains 7 tracks and 1 remix by Harri Agnel, is darker and maximized in duration, composition and arrangement, including elements form trip hop, minimal house, orchestral pop-rock, post-electronica, and many more influences from today's trends.

== Discography ==
=== Albums ===
- Lollipop (2008), The Sound Of Everything Records
- Pasta Flora (πάστα Φλώρα, 2010), The Sound Of Everything Records
- Minimal to Maximal (2012), The Sound Of Everything Records/Universal
- High Times (2015), Mo.Mi. Records
- Erotica (2017), Mo.Mi. Records
- Easteria (2020), Mo.Mi. Records
