= Aktina FM =

Greek american radio station

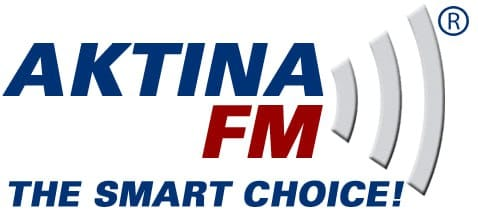
- Type: Nonprofit organization and commercial-free
- Founded: May 3, 1993
- Area served: Global
- Key people: Elena Maroulleti, Founder
- Website: aktinafm.com

Aktina FM, stylized as AKTINA FM, is the first Greek American bilingual radio station introduced in the USA. The station broadcasts a wide variety of programs focusing on the history, culture, and music of Greece and Cyprus, including news, special reports, and Greek sports.

Aktina FM is a public service and commercial-free radio station offering its 24/7 programs online for free. Founded in May 1993 in New York by Elena Maroulleti, an independent journalist and the station's Executive Producer and Host, It is owned and operated by Aktina Productions, a non-profit and tax-exempt 501(c)(3) Media and Arts Cultural Organization based in New York City.

Aktina FM is the first Greek-American radio station to be honored by the City of New York with a street co-naming, known as Aktina FM Way, in recognition of its contributions to the promotion of the Greek and Cypriot cultures in America.

== History ==
Aktina FM is the only Greek American radio station streaming online in a bilingual format, and the second online radio station to emerge in the world. It was initially launched on New York's public station WNYE 91.5FM on May 3, 1993 and soon after online. In late 2016, Aktina FM became a fully fledged 24/7 online radio station streaming throughout the US and worldwide.

Aktina FM offers programs designed for both Greek and non-Greek audiences through a bilingual format. The station also broadcasts content that informs, inspires, enlightens, connects, and entertains its listeners in the US and worldwide. Its programs focusing on Hellenic culture aim to enhance understanding of Cyprus and Greece. Aktina FM also supports Greek and Greek Cypriot Americans to preserve their cultural inheritance and strengthen their bonds with their ancestral roots. The station's music repertoire includes various genres of Greek music as well as selections of international classics.

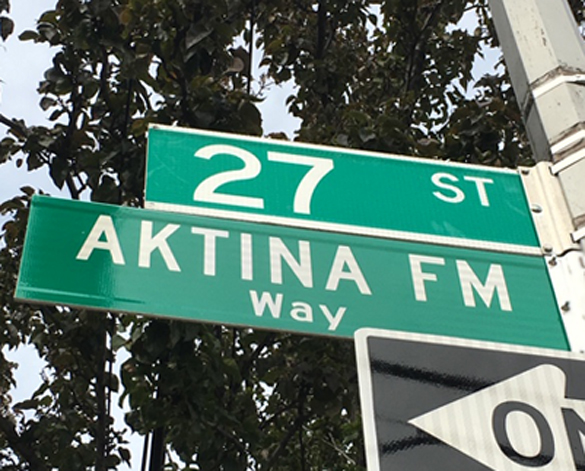
Aktina FM Way

Aktina FM is the first Greek-American radio station in the US to have a street named after it. On July 29, 2018, a bill initiated by then NYC Council Member Costa Constantinides was passed in the New York City Council, enacting Local Law 2018/139 to co-name the intersection of 27th Street and 23rd Avenue, in Astoria, in the Borough of Queens, New York, where the station was founded, as Aktina FM Way. The official co-naming ceremony took place on October 26, 2018.

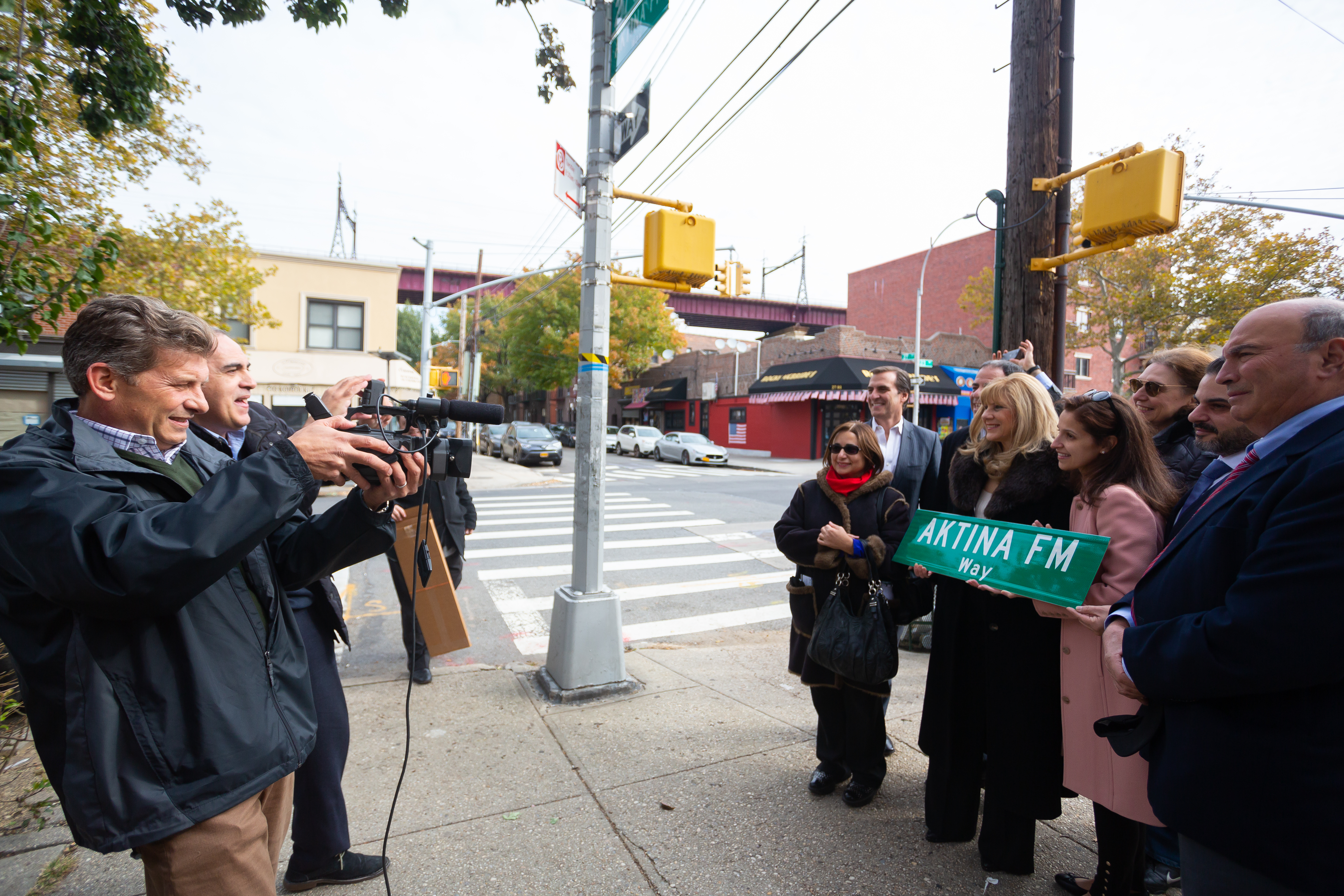
Dignitaries at Aktina FM Way Street sign unveiling

Aktina FM broadcasts online from its own websites which bear its recognized trademark name and logo and which are owned and operated by Aktina Productions. Aktina FM streams 24 hours a day, 7 days a week servicing listeners throughout the United States and worldwide. The station also broadcasts via TuneIn and other online streaming applications.
