= C Real (Greek band) =

Greek pop rock band

C:Real
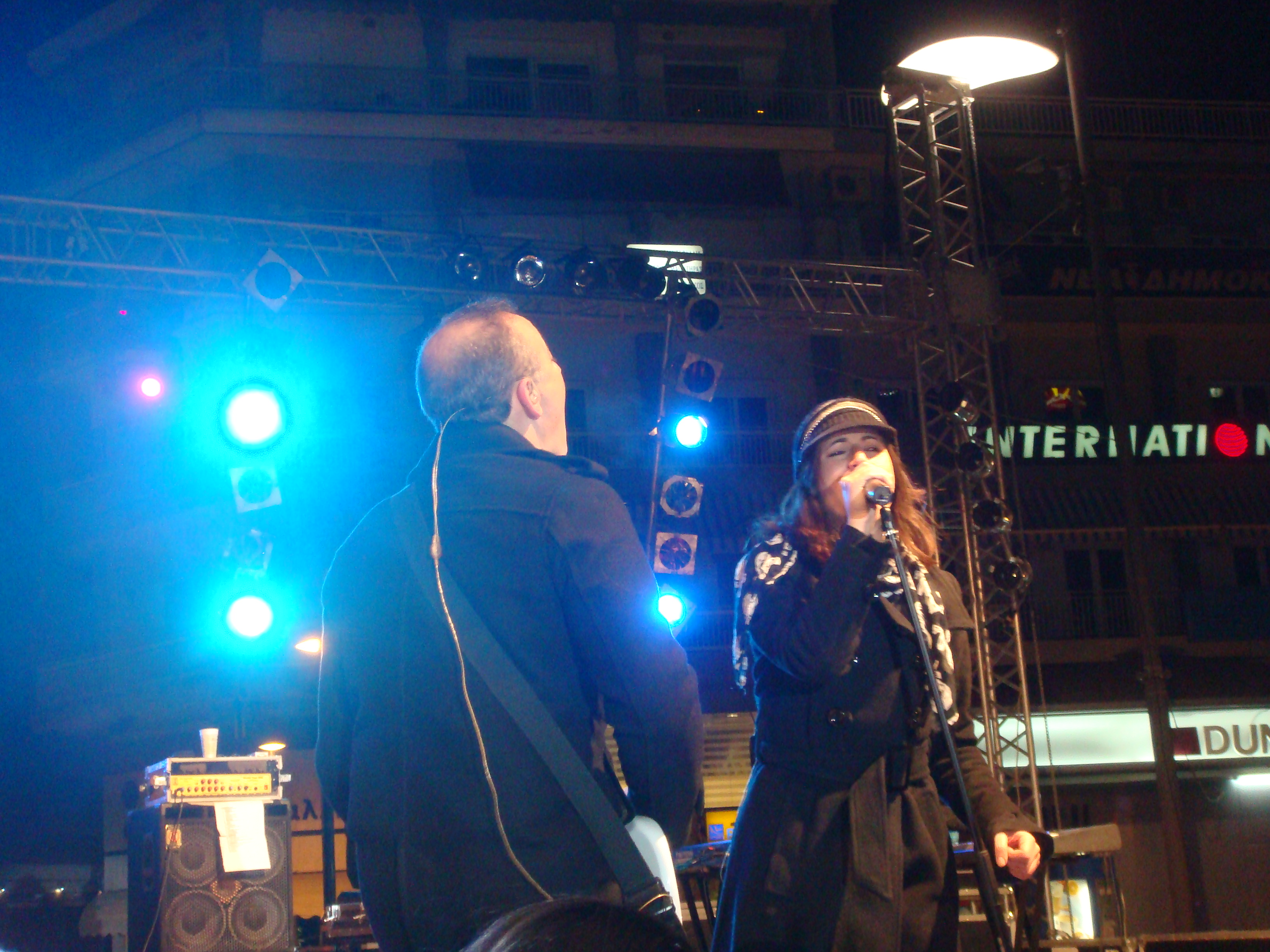
- C:Real performing in Katerini, Greece, in February 2009.

Background information
- Origin: Greece
- Genres: Pop rock
- Years active: 1996–present
- Labels: Dance Pool (1997–1998); Planetworks (2000); Heaven Music (2008–2010); Sony Music Greece (1997–1998, 2003–2008, 2010–present)
- Members: Takis Damaschis (guitar) Georgia Lazopoulou (vocals); Giannis Giannikos (lead guitar); Ilias Laitsas (drums)
- Past members: Irini Douka (Vocals); Dimitris Horianopoulos (drums); Manos Spyridakis (bass); Apostolis Koskinas (guitar)
- Website: www.c-real.gr

C:Real (pronounced as "see real" or "serial") are a Greek pop rock band. They are characterized by their pop rock sound and live performances.

== Career ==
=== 1997–2000: Beginnings ===
The group was created in 1996 by composer, lyricist, and producer Takis Damaschis. Their first single was released a little after the creation of group and was titled "A New Religion". One year later in 1997, they released their second single titled "Visions of You" featuring Sarah Jane Morris. The single was released in 30 countries, which was considered a world success for the fairly new group. In June 1997, C:Real released their debut album titled Realtime.

In December 1999, C:Real released the 4 track CD single "With or Without You", that is today considered their first major success in Greece. It was on the IFPI singles chart for over 18 weeks. The second single "Thinking of You", a Latin-sounding track featuring Sofia Strati, was released in mid 2000 as a CD single and soon after, the group's second album Stop Killing Time was released.

=== 2002–2006: The first Greek albums ===
Up until 2002, all of C:Real's releases were in English. With the addition of lead vocalist Irini Douka to the group, they started producing songs in Greek. Their first Greek language release was the three track CD single "Tha Se Thimamai" (I will remember you) which was a big radio and commercial success. The title track was also included on Giannis Spanou's album Anazitisi.

In October 2003, the group's third album titled Ta Pio Megala S'Agapo (The biggest 'I love you') was released. The album included 10 songs as well as the CD single "Tha Se Thimamai". The first single from the album was "Tha Perimeno" (I will wait) and became one of the radio hits of 2004, being released in 7 countries. The song also had a dance remix which was included on the album. It was after this release that C:Real began to establish their niche in the Greek music industry.

In October 2004, C:Real released their fourth studio album titled Hilia Hronia (A thousand years). The album featured a more "western" sound and contained 12 tracks. One of the tracks featured fellow Greek singer Giannis Vardis and was named "Etsi Kanoun Oi Kardies". In December 2005, the album was re-released with the addition of two new songs: "Etsi M'Aresei Na Zo" (That's how I like to live) and "Meine Dipla Mou" (Stay next to me) with the first becoming a radio hit.

Kathe Mou Skepsi (My every thought), C:Real's fifth studio album, was released in September 2006 and included 11 new songs. The album was different from previous releases, and the songs contained more pop-rock elements. The first single, "Epikindyna Se Thelo" (I want you dangerously), had a mix of ethnic and dance sounds and was the theme song for the Greek movie Straight Story that was released in theaters in December 2006.

=== 2008–2010: Move to Heaven Music ===
C:Real signed with Heaven Music in early 2008 and on March 31, 2008, they released their sixth studio album titled Invain. It contained ten tracks: seven in Greek and three in English. The first single was titled "Ksehase To" (Forget it) and it was released in February around the time that C:Real announced signing with Heaven. A music video of the song was created and described as being cartoonish. To promote the album, on April 2, 2008, they performed it live at club "Fuzz". The evening was organized by Germanos Stores, Sony Ericsson and Heaven Live. C:Real also planned a three-month tour of Greece for summer 2008 starting on June 7 and continuing through September 17. The last concert was very large and in Larissa. The tour focused on Invain, but also featured songs from C:Real's older albums.

=== 2010–present: Return to Sony Music Greece ===
C:Real parted ways with Heaven Music and re-signed with Sony Music Greece in June 2010. Their upcoming studio album is tentatively scheduled for release in October 2010. In November 2010, a message on the groups Facebook fan page by founder Takis Damashis announced that lead vocalist Irini Douka has decided to depart from the band, choosing to embark on a solo career instead. Damashis stated that Irini is a big part of C:Real's history, and deserves respect. Furthermore, Damashis stated that if they choose to stay together, they will pick a new lead singer that has a totally different voice and look than Irini. He elaborated that the group would have a totally different image and sound, and would not be a bad copy of their former version.

== Discography ==
=== Albums ===
- 1997: Realtime
- 2000: Stop Killing Time
- 2003: Ta Pio Megala S'agapo
- 2004: Hilia Hronia
- 2006: Kathe Mou Skepsi
- 2008: Invain

=== CD singles ===
- 1999: "With or Without You"
- 2000: "Thinking of You"
- 2002: "Tha Se Thimamai"
