= Mode Plagal =

- Origin: Athens, Greece
- Years active: 1990-present
- Members: Thodoris Rellos; Kleon Antoniou; Takis Kanellos; Antonis Maratos; Angelos Polychronou; Florian Mikuta

Mode Plagal is an originally Greek group who perform traditional Greek music blended with jazz, funk and other international styles. They have been described as "the preeminent ambassadors of the much-maligned vernacular Greek music in the 21st century"

The Athens-based band was formed in 1990 by Thodoris Rellos (saxophone, vocals), Kleon Antoniou (guitar, vocals) and Takis Kanellos (drums). They were joined in 1995 by Antonis Maratos (originally percussion, later bass); in 1997 by Angelos Polychronou (percussion); and in 2000 by Florian Mikuta (keyboards). After two albums of instrumental music, Mode Plagal and Mode Plagal II, they added vocals for their third album, Mode Plagal III. In 2002, they collaborated with Turkish group Bosphorus, led by composer Nikiforos Metaxas, to record the album Του Βόσπορου Το Πέρα ("Beyond the Bosphorus").

Critic Fiachra Gibbons wrote of Mode Plagal: "On first hearing, they are a driving, straightahead jazz-funk outfit. Listen longer and the restless Greek spirit, audible in the transcendent sax of Thodoris Rellos, becomes evident, drawing from rembetika - the Greek blues - and the dance music of the Balkans, Thrace, Asia Minor and all points east."

In 2008, they released the album Η Κάθοδος Των Σαλτιμπάγκων, recorded with Cretan band Hainides, and in 2010 they released Στην Κοιλιά Του Κήτους. In 2014, they released Πέρα Από Τα Σύνορα, a collaboration with Hainides and the musician Psarantonis (Antonis Xylouris).

== Discography ==
- Mode Plagal (1995, Ano Kato Records, Thessaloniki)
- Mode Plagal II (1998, Lyra Records)
- Mode Plagal III (2001, Lyra Records)
- Beyond the Bosphorus - collaboration with Bosphorus (2003, Hitch Hyke Records)
- In The Belly Of The Beast (2010, Lyra Records)
