= Lefteris Voyatzis =

Greek theater actor and director

Lefteris Vogiatzis (1945 – 2 May 2013) was a Greek theatre actor and director.

== His Life ==
Vogiatzis was born in Kallithea, Athens in 1945. He studied English literature at the University of Athens, he attended the Reinhurt Seminar in Vienna for two years and finished. Michailidis' Drama School in Athens.

He first appeared on stage in 1973. Then he collaborated with Spyros Evangelatos, and the famous actress Elli Lampeti. Over the years, he played many roles in classical repertoire.

In 1981 he founded the theatre company the Stage and in 1988 the new Stage. He directed and starred in many performances, while in 1989, he founded the laboratory of ancient drama, directing Antigone by Sophocles. Successful shows of his followed, such as "With Power from Kifissia", "Misanthrope", "Helen", "Night of the Owl", "Persians", "Ash and Shadow", "Clean Anymore" and other major plays. At the cinema, he starred almost exclusively in movies of Nikos Panagiotopoulos, with whom he was connected with a great friendship.

== Death ==
On 30 April 2013, there was a rumour Lefteris Vogiatzis had died of cancer. A little later the news was denied. Two days later, however, on Maundy Thursday afternoon, the news came back, and this time it was true. His funeral was planned for Wednesday, 8 May, while his body was exposed to secular pilgrimage on the same day from 12:00 until 16:00 in his theatre of Cycladon Street, at the request of Lefteris.

== Sources ==
- Biography of Lefteris Vogiatzis
- Biography Of L. Vogiatzis
