= Ta Pio Megala S'agapo =

Ta Pio Megala S'agapo Τα Πιό Μεγάλα Σ'αγαπώ

Studio album by C:Real
- Released: October 24, 2003
- Recorded: 2003
- Genre: Pop rock
- Language: Greek, English
- Label: Sony Music Greece/Epic
- Producer: Dakis Damaschis, Takis Retsinas, Giannis Spanos, Irini Douka

C:Real chronology
Stop Killing Time (2002)	Ta Pio Megala S'agapo; Τα Πιό Μεγάλα Σ'αγαπώ (2003)	Hilia Hronia (2004)

Singles from Ta Pio Megala S'agapo
- 1. "Tha Se Thimame" Released: 2003; 2. "Tha Perimeno" Released: 2003; 3. "An Den Se Ksanado" Released: 2004

Ta Pio Megala S'agapo (Greek: Τα Πιό Μεγάλα Σ'αγαπώ; English: The biggest I love you) is the name of the first Greek-language mainstream album and third studio album overall by Greek musical group C:Real. The album was released in 2003 by Sony Music Greece in Greece and Cyprus.

== Track listing ==
1. "Tha Perimeno" (I will wait)
2. "An Den Se Ksanado" (If I do not see you again)
3. "Tha Se Thimame" (I will remember you)
4. "Afto Tha Pei S'agapo" (That's what I love you means)
5. "Mia Agapi Gia Sena" (A love for you)
6. "Emeis Den Kanoume Mazi" (We don't get along together)
7. "Logia" (Words)
8. "Den Iparheis Pia" (You don't exist anymore)
9. "Protect Me"
10. "Thorn in My Side"
11. "Your Favourite Kiss"
12. "Tha Perimeno (NV Dance Mix)" (I will wait)

== Singles ==
"Tha Se Thimame"

The first single from the album was "Tha Se Thimame" and was released as a CD single in the summer prior to the album's release.

"Tha Perimeno"

The second single was "Tha Perimeno" which went on to become a big airplay hit, propelling the group to mainstream success. The music video was directed by Manolis Tzirakis.

"An Den Se Ksanado"

The last single from the album was "An Den Se Ksanado". The music video was once again directed by Manolis Tzirakis.

== Awards ==
=== 4th Arion Music Awards ===
- Best Pop Album
- Best Pop Song ("Tha Perimeno")
- Best Pop Group (nominated)

=== MAD Video Music Awards 2005 ===
- Best Video by a Group ("An Den Se Ksanado") (nominated)
