= Aktina Productions =

New York-based Greek American non-profit cultural organization

Aktina Productions, Inc.
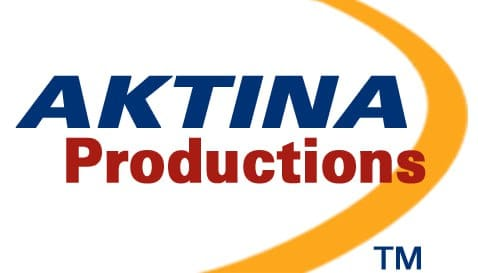
- Company type: Nonprofit organization with tax-exempt 501(c)(3) status
- Industry: Mass media, Cultural activities, Promotion of the cultures of Greece and Cyprus
- Founded: May 3, 1993
- Headquarters: New York City, United States of America (USA)
- Key people: Elena Maroulleti (Founder and President)
- Products: Radio and Television broadcasting, Internet radio, Streaming media, Internet, AKTINA FM Radio, AKTINA TV, Digital Rights, Telecommunications, Music, Digital Distribution, Education Concerts from music series, “Greek Music Journey” (GMJ) Production and presentation of cultural programs and events
- Website: aktinaproductions.com

Aktina Productions, stylized in all caps as AKTINA, is a New York-based Greek American non-profit cultural organization, incorporated in May 1993 under 501 (c)(3) tax-exempt status. Founded by Elena Maroulleti, Aktina is dedicated to promoting the culture, folklore, music and history of Greece and Cyprus through broadcast media, live concerts, and other activities for the benefit of Greek Americans and the general public.

Aktina is the owner of the public service and commercial-free media outlets Aktina FM (est. May 1993), an online radio station streaming 24/7 in America and worldwide, and Aktina TV (est. April 2002), broadcasting on WNYE-Channel 25 in New York. Aktina also offers the concert series, “Greek Music Journey” (GMJ).

== History ==
On May 3, 1993, Aktina introduced the first-ever bilingual radio known as Aktina FM on New York's public station WNYE 91.5FM. In early 1994, Aktina FM started streaming on the Internet, becoming the second online radio station to emerge in the world. On April 2, 2002, the organization introduced Aktina TV on WNYE's sister station, Channel 25. The TV show broadcasts exclusively in English, offering closed captions for the hearing impaired and English subtitles when Greek is spoken. Both Aktina FM and Aktina TV were founded by Elena Maroulleti, an independent journalist who also serves as their Executive Producer and Host.

Aktina has twenty-one domains that host its websites and stream its radio station, Aktina FM, 24/7 online under its Trademark name and logo. Registered in the US, Greece, and Cyprus, ten of these domains are “Internet country code top-level domains (ccTLDs).” The streaming of Aktina FM is available in different bit rates to accommodate all users.

The organization's owned and operated media outlets, Aktina FM and Aktina TV, offer original content on the cultures of Greece and Cyprus, newscasts, information on the life and activities of the New York-based Greek American community, special reports of general public interest, and TV mini-documentaries filmed on location that pertain to Greek and Cypriot history and culture. The 24/7 online streaming of the Aktina FM reaches over 1 million listeners in New York and over 2 million worldwide. Aktina TV broadcasting on WNYE-Channel in New York, reaches over 1 million viewers.

In 1993, Aktina began collaborating with Cypreco of America, Inc., a non-profit and tax-exempt 501(c)(3) cultural organization. The two organizations work together for the benefit of their respective Greek American and non-Greek audiences. Cypreco presents cultural programs within the broadcasts of both Aktina FM and Aktina TV and co-produces some of Aktina's music concerts.

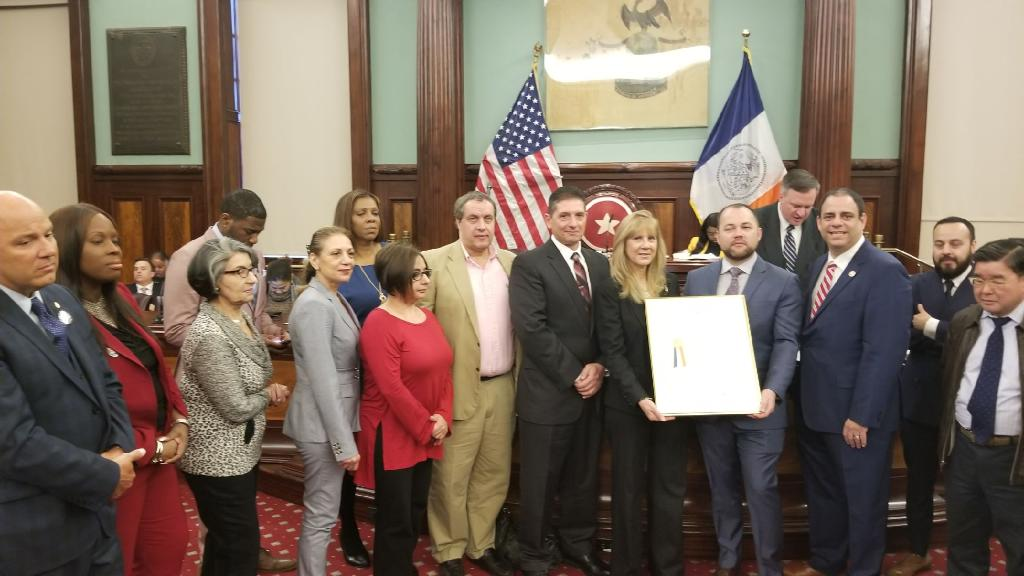
Ajtina Productions, Inc., honored with Proclamation on its 25th Anniversary by NYC Council

In 1994, the “Greek Music Journey” (GMJ) concert series was introduced and fully established in 1997 to promote and preserve the various genres of Greek music, including traditional, folk, rembetika, and contemporary, highlighting the diversity and cultural significance of the musical heritage of Greece. ” Since 1994, Aktina presented over thirty GMJ concerts. The majority of these concerts were held at landmark venues in Manhattan, NY, such as Alice Tully Hall at Lincoln Center, The Town Hall and The Kaye Playhouse.

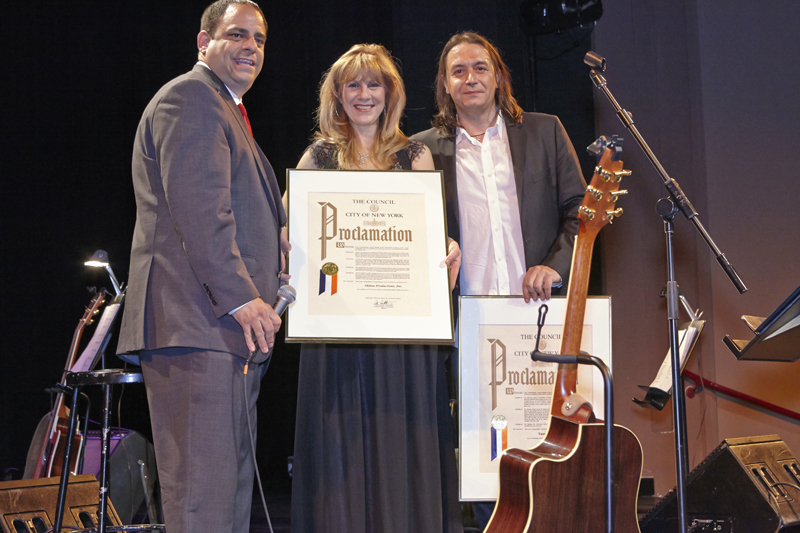
AKTINA honored with Proclamation for Greek Music Journey 2015

In 2003, Aktina, launched the Aktina TV YouTube channel, where the majority of programs that initially air on Aktina TV on WNYE-Channel 25 are posted, along with music videos from the concert series “Greek Music Journey.” As of 2024, the channel has over 7,000 subscribers, with some of its posted music videos surpassing 3.5 million views.

== Awards and recognition ==
Aktina has received various distinctions, including citations, proclamations, and entries in congressional records, from elected officials at the city, state, and federal levels in the U.S. These awards acknowledge Aktina's contributions and significance in promoting and preserving the various cultural characteristics of Greece and Cyprus through the broadcasts of Aktina FM and Aktina TV, as well as the production of its music concerts and other activities.
