= Mikres Fotografies =

Studio album by Giannis Ploutarhos
- Released: 2001
- Label: Minos EMI

Giannis Ploutarhos chronology
Ipirhan Orki (2000)	Mikres Fotografies (2001)	Den Einai O Erotas...Paidi Tis Logikis (2003)

Mikres Fotografies is the third studio album by Greek singer Giannis Ploutarhos, released in 2001 by Minos EMI.

The title track, "Mikres fotografies", peaked at no.1 on the Greek Singles Chart.

== Track listing ==
No.	Title	Length
1.	"File"	3:37
2.	"An eisai h agapi"	3:39
3.	"Sagapo akoma"	3:20
4.	"Monos mou ksana"	3:01
5.	"Kateva ligo na se do"	4:39
6.	"San na eisai edo"	3:40
7.	"Ti stauro kouvalao"	3:53
8.	"Ola esy"	3:48
9.	"Kardia mou kane ypomonei"	3:06
10.	"Mikres fotografies"	3:45
11.	"Exo anagki na se do"	3:36
12.	"Fovamai pws"	3:08
13.	"Ax koritsi mou"	3:54
14.	"Krima"	4:20
15.	"Hthele leei"	2:32
16.	"Ax vre kardia"	4:03

== Charts ==
Chart (2002)	Peak position
Greek Singles Chart	1
