= Petros Gaitanos =

Greek singer (born 1967)

Petros Gaitanos (Greek: Πέτρος Γαϊτάνος born October 31, 1967) is a Greek singer. He was born and raised in the village of Kokkinogeia located in Drama, Greece.

Gaitanos has always enjoyed singing since childhood, and was singing professionally by the time he was 17.

From 1986 to 1991 Gaitanos studied at the Athens Conservatoire and earned a degree in Byzantine music, as well as European music, while graduating magna cum laude. Influenced by Byzantine music, he has produced a series of records with Byzantine works and hymns, and he is considered to be one of the most famous Byzantine musicians, especially in Greece. He has produced up to 44 musical albums, and has collaborated with artists such as Yiannis Fertis, Katia Dandoulaki, Yiannis Voglis, and Koralia Koranti.

During his artistic career he served as artistic director of the Foundation "Karitteion Melathron". In addition to his musical accomplishments, he has an extensive photo archive of his own photography that contains over one million photographs.

In 2012 he expressed support for the far-right Greek party Golden Dawn. He later apologized for the comments, stating he had no relationship with Golden Dawn. He also enjoys traveling.

== Discography ==
- 1990 - Το δίλημμα (To Dilimma)
- 1992 - Γυάλινος δρομέας (Gyalinos Dromeas)
- 1993 - Σε πρώτο πρόσωπο (Se proto prosopo)
- 1995 - Ώρα Ενάτη (Ora Enati)
- 1996 - Πολιτεία Δ (Politeia D’)
- 1997 - Τα Θεία Πάθη (Ta Theia Pathi)
- 1998 - Αγέρας,έρωτας κι αρμύρα (Ageras, erotas ki armyra)
- 1998 - Φως εκ φωτός (Fos ek fotos)
- 1999 - Ψάλλω το Θεώ μου έως Υπάρχω (Psallo to Theo mou eos Yparcho)
- 2000 - Σαν τα Κρύα τα νερά (San ta krya ta nera)
- 2000 - Η πηγή της Ζωής (I pigi tis zois)
- 2001 - Κρυφή Σελίδα (Kryfi selida)
- 2003 - Πεντηκοστάριον (Pentikostarion)
- 2006 - Τραγούδια του Πόντου (Tragoudia tou Pontou)
- 2020- Ο Παρακλητικός Κανώνας (O Paraklitikos Kanonas)
- 2021- Άγιος Παΐσιος Ο Αγιορείτης (Τόμος 1) (Agios Paisios O Agioreitis (Vol.1))
- 2022- Σμύρνη Έση (Smyrni Esi)
