= Cayetano (Giorgos Bratanis) =

Greek musician

- Also known as: Cayetano
- Born: Georgios Bratanis; August 29, 1977 (age 48)
- Origin: Thessaloniki, Greece
- Genres: Trip hop, downtempo, jazz, Freestyle
- Occupations: Musician, Producer, DJ
- Years active: 1996-present
- Labels: Etage Noir Recordings, Klik Records
- Website: www.cayetanomusic.com

Giorgos Bratanis (born August 29, 1977), better known by his artistic name Cayetano is a Greek musician. He performs with his band — Cayetano Live Band — and as a DJ worldwide.

== Biography ==
Ever since Bratanis was very young, he was involved with several indie bands and at the same time he was studying music. In 1995 he was a member of the popular band "Stroggylo Kitrino" (The Round Yellow). They released two albums, "Stroggylo Kitrino" in 1996 and "O Ksenos" (The Stranger") in 1999 from the legendary "Lazy Dog Records".

In 2000 he started travelling all over Europe and then stayed in Barcelona, Spain, until 2004. There he worked with several Spanish groups as a pianist and a bassist, toured with them in Spain, wrote music for theater and cinema, and made the dub-triphop-jazz oriented "Cayetano" project.

His first album, Mr. White, was released in vinyl from the German label Kinky Lounge in 2001. Another album, Cayetano, followed in 2003 from the same label. It was the time that Cayetano started to be well known on the European scene. In 2004 he went back to Greece and made Sala Sonora Records. In 2006 he released from his own label, the Focused album, which made him well known to the public. He toured all over Europe, and the album was voted as one of the best albums of 2006 in more than 30 major radio stations in 14 countries. In the same year and because of this album, Cayetano was nominated for the French award, "Prix Radiophonie".

In 2008 Cayetano signed with the label Etage Noir, and produced Loopa Scava's album Loopa Scava meets Cayetano - Up and Down, which was a success on the underground trip hop scene. This brought him to the top of the European scene, and the press was putting him near to big artists such like Bonobo and Wax Tailor. In the meantime he did remixes for well-known artists such like Tailor, Parov Stelar, Timewapr Inc., Ancient Austronauts. In 2009 he released The Big Fall album (Etage Noir). His appearance in major festivals gave him the reputation he needed and he got numerous sold-out gigs, his tracks are on the most popular compilations and programs on TV.

In October 2010, Cayetano signed with Klik Records and released the album Back Home two months later. Four months after the release, the 'Back Home Tour' begun.

On October 8, 2012, Cayetano released, "Once Sometime" whilst the remixed version of the album was released on January 13, 2014, on Klik Records new sub-label, Pale Sound Records. He appeared on the same stage with artists such as Bonobo, Parov Stelar, Dj Krush, Alice Russell, Koop, Dj Bootsie, DJ Food, DJ Shadow, Kormac, Karuan and Morcheeba

=== Cayetano Live Band ===
In 2006, Cayetano formed the "Cayetano Live Band" right after the release of the Focused album, with 11 musicians on stage. Nowadays, the band consists of five musicians on stage and one FOH technician.

==== Current members of Cayetano Live Band ====
- Giorgos "Cayetano" Bratanis (samplers, keyboards, vocals, programming)
- Georges Perin (vocals)
- Thanasis Dzingovic (guitar)
- Tolis Deligiannis (bass)
- Alex Makatselos (drums)
- Leo Beilis (sound engineer)

==== Former members of Cayetano Live Band ====
- Themis Veleni (vocals)
- Christos Manuel (vocals)
- Tasos Peltekis (guitar)
- Cherry Piker (guitar)
- Yannis Stolakis (percussions)
- Alex Archodis (drums)
- Ilias Girbas (saxophone)
- Dimitris Dalezis (trumpet)
- Giorgos Aggelakis (trombone)
- Dimitris Tselios (saxophone, flute)
- Alex Papoulidis (guitar)
- John Bell (bass)
- Thomas Kostoulas (drums, percussions)
- John Parzialis (bass)

=== Cayetano as a DJ ===
Cayetano is known for his DJ sets in which he combines dub with Latin and funky grooves. Sometimes he appears together with Dj Booker (as a Cayetano Soundsystem) and Dimitris Tselios (saxophone).

== Discography ==
=== Albums ===
- Stroggylo Kitrino - Stroggylo Kitrino (1996, Lazy Dog Records)
- Stroggylo Kitrino - O Ksenos (1999, Lazy Dog Records)
- Cayetano - Mr. White (2001, Kinky Lounge Records)
- Cayetano - Cayetano (2003, Kinky Lounge Records)
- Cayetano - Focused (2006, Sala Sonora Records)
- Cayetano - The Big Fall (2009, Etage Noir Recordings)
- Cayetano - Back Home (2010, Klik Records)
- Cayetano - Once Sometime (2012, Pale Sound Records)
- Cayetano - Once Sometime Remixed (2014, Pale Sound Records)
- Cayetano - The Right Time (2015, Klik Records)
- Cayetano – Melanie (2018, High Hop Records)
- Cayetano - A Million Faces (2022, High Hop Records)

=== Productions ===
- Giorgos Stavrianos - Codes (2007, Eros Music)
- Loopa Scava Meets Cayetano - Up And Down (2008, Etage Noir Recordings)
- SWORR. - Sworr. (2018, FWF Records)
- Magenta Flows - Saturation (2020, High Hop Records)
- Gangsters Of Love - Never Satisfied (2020, GOL Records)
- Δημήτρης Μπαλογιάννης - Γενέθλια (2022, Formigga Art)
- Πάνος Μουζουράκης - Σωκράτης Μάλαμας - Το Άλογο (2025, EMI)

=== Singles ===
- Cayetano - Strange Me (2020, High Hop Records)
- Cayetano - Flashback (2020, High Hop Records)
- Cayetano - Get Back (2021, High Hop Records)
- Cayetano - Got To Walk On (2022, High Hop Records)
- Cayetano - A Million Faces (2022, High Hop Records)
- Cayetano - Sun City Creeps (2022, High Hop Records)
- Cayetano - Bali (2022, High Hop Records)
- Cayetano - To Be Your Friend (2023, High Hop Records)
- Cayetano - Crush (2024, High Hop Records)
- Cayetano - Lobster Claw (2024, High Hop Records)
- Cayetano - Phonemes (2025, High Hop Records)

=== EPs ===
- Cayetano - Music For Performing Arts (2021, High Hop Records)
