= Nikos Portokaloglou =

Greek singer, songwriter, and lyricist

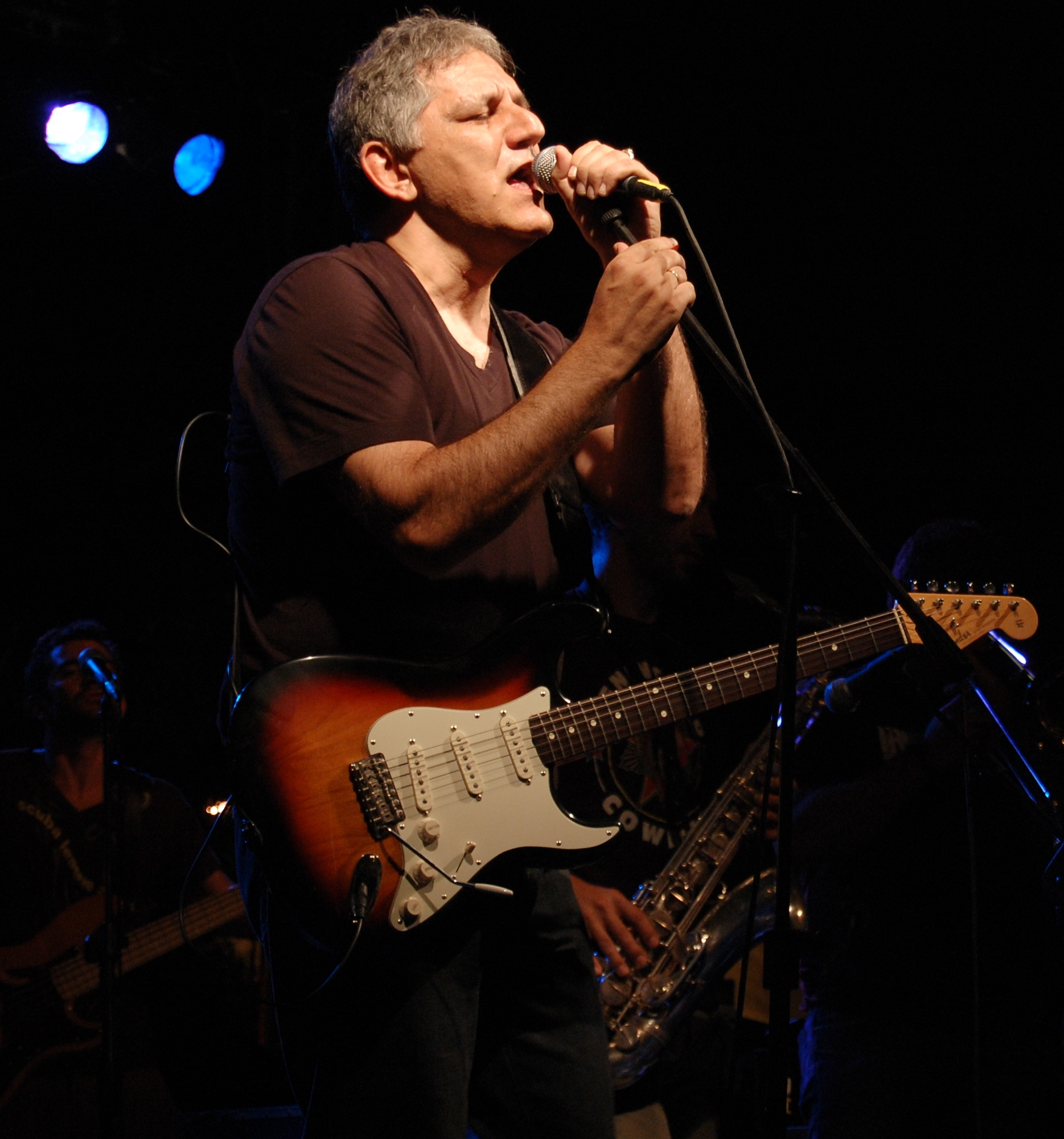

Background information
- Born: 30 December 1957 (age 68); Volos, Greece
- Genres: Éntekhno, Rock music
- Occupations: Singer, songwriter, lyricist
- Years active: 1980–present
- Website: http://portokaloglou.gr

Nikos Portokaloglou (Greek: Νίκος Πορτοκάλογλου, pronounced [ˈnikos poɾtoˈkaloɣlu]; born 30 December 1957) is a Greek singer-songwriter and lyricist. He started his career in 1980 as a founding member of Fatme. The band's first, self-titled album was released in 1982 and followed up by another five in the same decade, among them Taxidi and Vgenoume apo to tounel. In 1990, Portokaloglou embarked on a solo career, which he continues to pursue. Notable solo albums of his include Ta karavia mou keo, Dipsa, and Brazilero, which are the soundtrack for the eponymous movie. Portokaloglou further scored the films Akropol and Valkanizater. In 2002 he won three Arion awards in the categories "Best Song", "Best Entechno Album" and "Best Movie Soundtrack". He has cooperated with other well-known singers from Greece such as Haris Alexiou, Melina Kana and Eleftheria Arvanitaki.

== Discography ==
=== With Fatme ===
- 1982: Fatme (Φατμέ)
- 1983: Psemmata (Ψέμματα)
- 1985: Risko (Ρίσκο)
- 1986: Vgenoume apo to tounel (Βγαίνουμε από το τούνελ)
- 1988: Taxidi (Ταξίδι)
- 1989: Palko (Πάλκο)

=== Solo career ===
- 1990: Fones (Φωνές)
- 1991: Siko psychi mou, siko chorepse (Σήκω ψυχή μου, σήκω χόρεψε)
- 1993: Ta karavia mou keo (Τα καράβια μου καίω)
- 1996: Asotos ios (Άσωτος υιός)
- 1997: Kryfto (Κρυφτό)
- 1999: Pechnidia me ton diavolo (Παιγνίδια με τον διάβολο)
- 2001: Braziliero (Μπραζιλέρο)
- 2002: Thalassa Remixes (Θάλασσα Remixes)
- 2002: Iparchi logos sovaros (Υπάρχει λόγος σοβαρός)
- 2003: Dipsa (Δίψα)
- 2005: Pame alli mia fora (Πάμε άλλη μια φορά)
- 2005: Pame alli mia fora (Πάμε άλλη μια φορά) – Special Edition
- 2006: To potami (Το ποτάμι)
- 2006: Ena vima pio konta (Ένα βήμα πιο κοντά)
- 2007: Ektos schediou (Εκτός σχεδίου)
- 2008: I svοura ke alles istories (Η σβούρα και άλλες ιστορίες)
- 2009: Strofi (Στροφή)
- 2010: Apopse ine orea (Απόψε είναι ωραία)
- 2012: Isos (Ίσως)
- 2014: Limania xena (Λιμάνια Ξένα)
- 2017: Eisitirio (Εισιτήριο)
