= Yannis Kotsiras =

Greek singer and musician (born 1969)

Yannis Kotsiras Γιάννης Κότσιρας
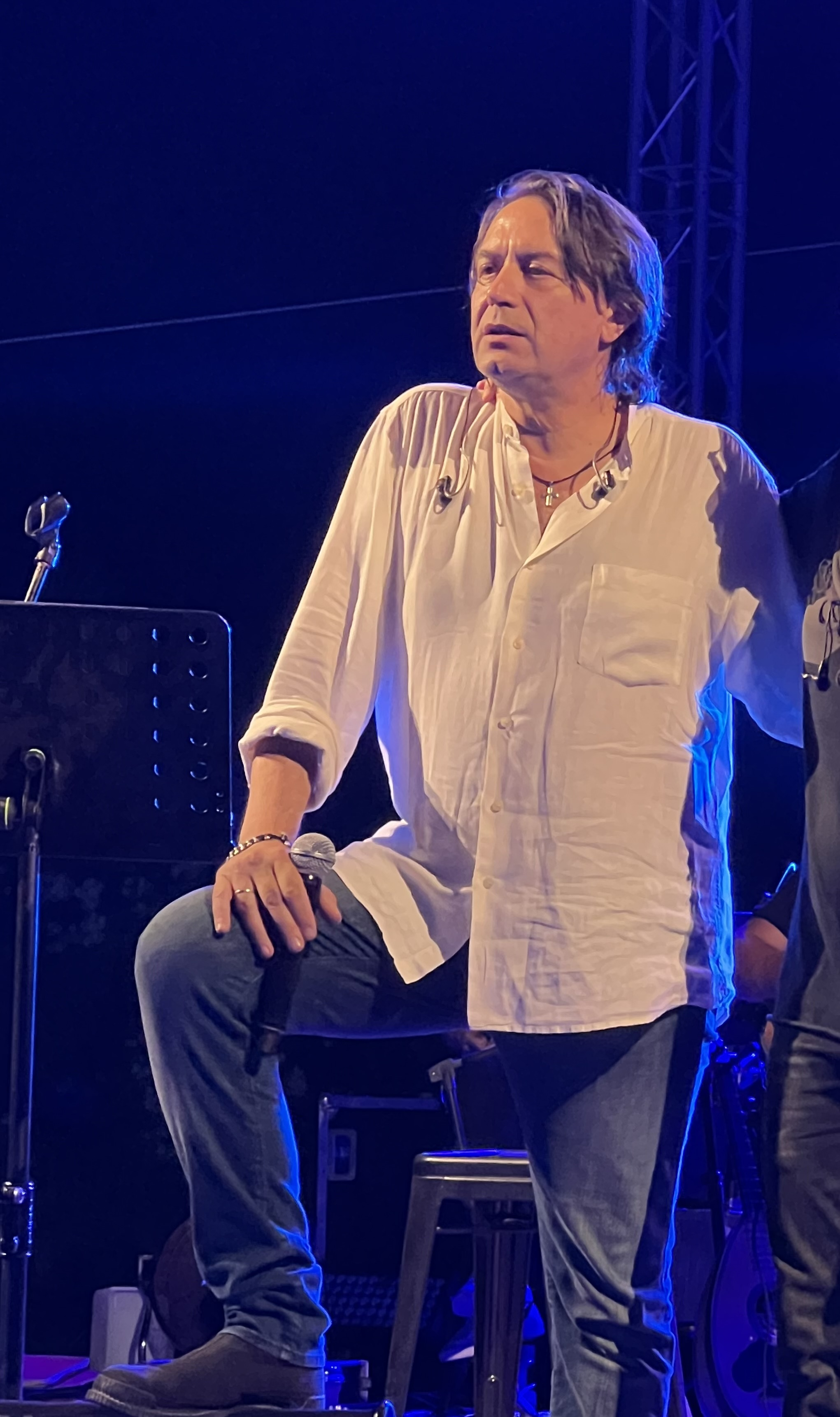
- Yannis Kotsiras in 2023

Background information
- Born: 5 October 1969
- Origin: Athens, Greece
- Genres: Entechno, laiko, pop
- Occupations: singer, songwriter
- Instruments: guitar, vocals
- Years active: 1990–present

Yannis Kotsiras (Greek: Γιάννης Κότσιρας; born 5 October 1969) is a Greek singer and songwriter.

== Life and career ==
Kotsiras was born in Athens on 5 October 1969.

He began his career in 1990, singing folk music, and released his first album in 1996, titled Athoos Enochos ('Innocent Guilt'). He released his first live album in 2002. In 2004, in honour of that year's Athens Olympic Games, he released the song "Pass the Flame" in English, Greek, and instrumental versions on the same CD. In 2010, he began a collaboration with Yasmin Levy. Among his most popular songs are "Filakas Aggelos"('Guardian Angel') and "Anathema Se" ('Curse You').

== Discography ==
=== Studio albums ===
- Athoos Enochos ('Innocent Guilt') (1996)
- Mono Enafili ('Just a Kiss') (1997)
- Filakas Aggelos ('Guardian Angel') (1999)
- Ine diki mas i zoi mas (2000)
- Xylino alogaki (2003)
- 30 kai kati (2004)
- Taxidia filia (2006)
- Kai pali paidi (2008)
- I Smyrni tou erota (2012) [& Estudiantina]
- Ilios kokkinos (2012) [Album by Marios Tokas, 3 songs]
- Mousiko kouti (2013)
- O,ti thymasai den pethainei (2014)
- Pinelopi Delta (2015) Music for theatre
- Pseftis Keros ('Lying Weather') (2016)
- Kita giro (2020)

=== Live albums ===
- Yannis Kotsiras LIVE (2002)
- Ti tragoudi na sou po – DVD (2003)
- Yannis Kotsiras Live 2010 (2010)

=== Compilations ===
- Best of Yiannis Kotsiras (2004)
- Paragelia Best of (2016)

=== Soundtracks ===
- Adis (1996)
- Valkanizater (1997)
- Efapax – CD single (2001)
- Pinelopi Delta - theatrical play (2015)

=== Re-released ===
- Axion Esti (2002) (Mikis Theodorakis)
- Pnevmatiko Emvatirio (2002) (Mikis Theodorakis)
- Stavros tou Notou ( 2005) (Thanos Mikroutsikos)
- O Dromos (2006) (Mimis Plessas & Lefteris Papadopoulos)
