= Rock music in Greece =

Greek appreciation of and contributions to the rock music genre

Greek rock
- Stylistic origins: Hard rock; rock and roll; blues rock; rock; progressive rock; Greek folk; proto-punk
- Cultural origins: 1960s, Greece

Rock and roll entered Greece in the early 1960s. In this "Golden Youth" era, pop-rock bands were the first to appear, but were soon followed by the formation of true rock bands, such as Aphrodite's Child. Greek rock bands and performers in later decades include Socrates Drank the Conium, Pavlos Sidiropoulos, Dimitris Poulikakos, and The Last Drive. In the beginning of the 1980s, there was a small but energetic number of punk and New Wave bands, and in the 1990s hip-hop elements also entered the mainstream rock scene.

== 1960s ==
Greek rock (Greek: Ελληνικό ροκ, pronounced [eliniˈko rok]) originated in the early 1960s with the creation of several anglophone pop-rock bands, such as the Forminx (which included composer Vangelis), the Charms, the Idols, the Olympians, and many more. True rock groups that blended rock and roll, folk rock, and psychedelic rock appeared soon after, such as the M.G.C., the Fratelli, and Aphrodite's Child (Vangelis, Demis Roussos and Loukas Sideras), with the latter being one of the most important and successful Greek rock bands that achieved international fame with their albums It's Five O'Clock (1969) and 666 (1972). The same period also saw the appearance of the Greek Néo Kýma movement, which combined elements of rock, entechno, ballads, and French chansons. Composers and performers included Mimis Plessas, Giannis Spanos, Dionysis Savvopoulos, and many others.

== 1970s ==
Rock music in Greece first peaked in the early 1970s, while Greece was still ruled by a military dictatorship. Bands included Socrates Drank The Conium (anglophone progressive rock), Nostradamos, Exadahtylos (political/satirical lyrics), Pelóma Bokioú (Santana-like Latin rock with Greek lyrics), Poll (folk with vocal harmonies, Greek lyrics), Axis (Paris-based Greek band).

Kostas Tournas is one of the pioneers of Greek rock. He is a singer and composer of many hits in the 1970s with a long career and a string of hits which continue to this day. His 1972 progressive-psychedelic solo album rock opera Aperanta Horafia (Infinite Fields) is considered a landmark of Greek rock and an act of resistance against the junta which ruled Greece at the time.

Tournas along with Robert Williams and Stavros Logarides, co-founders of the legendary rock group Poll, created a music wave which met with great success and took the music scene of Athens by storm. Their music resonated with the young and created songs which still remain in the history of Greek rock.

The fall of the dictatorship was followed by the cultural dominance of progressive thinking, even though the government was right-wing. For the right-wing conservatives, as well as for the communist left (KKE), rock was an "imported" (xenoferto – ξενόφερτο) music genre and instead they promoted music based on local traditions like Theodorakis' compositions or plain old Greek folk music.

One of the most popular rock music artists during that decade was Pavlos Sidiropoulos, who managed to merge rock sounds with Greek lyrics, especially in his collaboration with the band Spiridoula and the album Flou (1978). Another important musician who experimented with Greek lyrics was Nikolas Asimos, who recorded his first illegal tapes during the same decade. Greek rock was revived at the end of the 1970s, with the first punk and New Wave bands, as well as some older artists. The ex-frontman of Exadahtylos, Dimitris Poulikakos recorded the album Metafore Ekdrome O Mitsos in 1976.

== 1980s ==
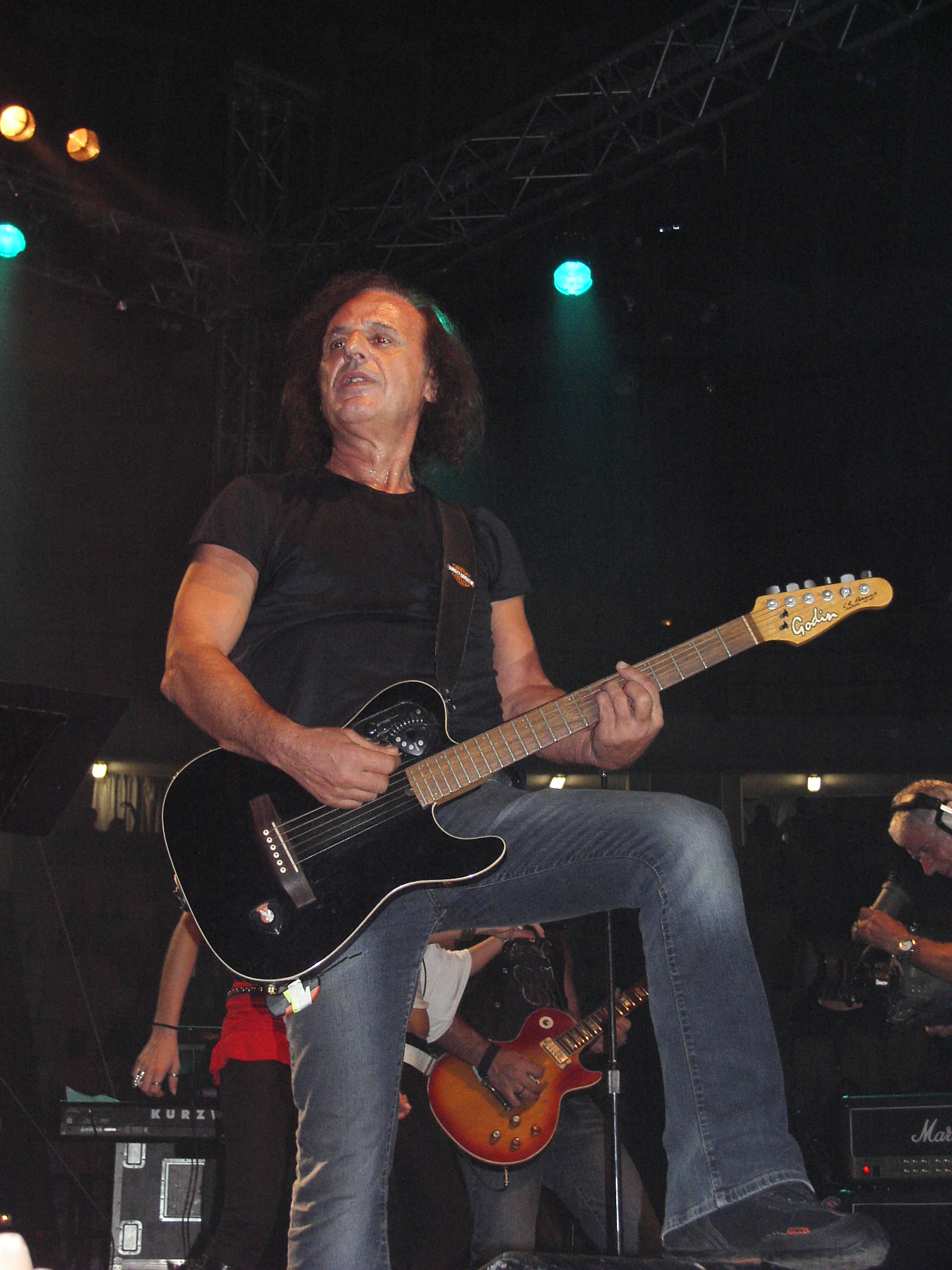
Vasilis Papakonstantinou

During the 1980s, Greek rock underwent a decisive shift toward Greek-language lyrics, transitioning gradually from the political songs of the *Metapolitefsi* (post-dictatorship) era and the English-language underground scene into a mature, dynamic, Greek-language scene that experienced a massive flourishing. While English-language bands of the time remained largely confined to simple imitations of the British sound—resulting in low sales and limited audiences—the emergence of homegrown acts radically transformed the musical landscape. During this same period, the New Wave and Post-Punk scene was also cultivating its own small but loyal following.

At the beginning of the 1980s, there was a musical enrichment in the scene, as more and more bands flourished, despite the extensive censorship, which gradually stopped later on. A primary example of this era is Mousikes Taxiarhies (Greek for Musical Brigades), with frontman Tzimis Panousis. The lyrical content of the band varied from the humorous and lightly satirical to an all-out criticism of the Greek political life. Nonetheless, the band played music with rich musical content, a mixture of many influences besides rock, such as reggae and funk. Pavlos Sidiropoulos went on throughout the decade, forming the band Aprosarmostoi and producing with them some of his finest albums. Early in 1981, the band Fatme was formed combining very creatively elements of Greek popular music roots and rock for the first time. Their frontman was Nikos Portokaloglou who is still a recording singer-songwriter of great acclaim.

Even though Vasilis Papakonstantinou started his career in the 1970s, it wasn't until the beginning of the 1980s that he gained huge popularity and became one of the most successful Greek rock singers. Vasilis Papakonstantinou is still active today and he continues to release successful albums.

Adonis Mitzelos

The Termites (originallyPLJ Band) played a central role in this mass transition. Following their English-language progressive album *Armageddon* (1982), they shifted to Greek lyrics, bridging the electric rock sound with *entechno* (artistic/sophisticated) and *laiko* (popular/folk) music—most notably through their landmark collaborations with Giorgos Dalaras on the recordI Amartoli Maria *I (1984) and with Flery Dantonaki on the album *Tsimentenia Traina* (1986). A decisive factor and the "mastermind" behind this sound was the group’s guitarist, composer, and arranger, Adonis Mitzelos—rightly described as the architect of modern electric song in Greece. By introducing pioneering techniques, he established the structures that served as the foundation for all subsequent mainstream rock bands of the 1990s. With Termites, the genre definitively moved beyond the underground, achieving mass, multi-platinum appeal and filling stadiums, theaters, and large music venues across Greece.

In 1980, Syndromo was formed with guitar player Nikos Ginis and Panos Katsikiotis (Chiko) on drums, Bill Korovesis on guitar and Kostas Theodorakos on bass, also a Costas on percussions. Their first self-titled album (1982) was a mix of rock with funk, sounding a lot like Talking Heads that were an inspiration for the band. Nikos Ginis appeared on the Greek Rock scene in a concert in Zografou's Vaska Private School (where most rock concerts were organized at the time), as a surprise one-off guitar solo player with a brilliant local band (The Fakiola brothers band with Nik Kourtis as drummer) and since he had just returned from the US had a lot new tricks up his guitar playing sleeve. Syndromo referenced hard drugs in most of their songs (all members were heroin users at the time), and it was one of the few bands that performed their own material.

Also in 1980 the anglophone New Wave band Sharp Ties was formed by Tolis Fasois (lead vocalist), George Karagiannidis (bass), Petros Skoutaris (guitar) and Pantelis Bees Karachisarides (drums). Influenced by the punk and ska/reggae bands of the era, like The Specials, that adopted a 1960s mod dressing style, Fasois decided on the name Sharp Ties, which also referred to "family ties". Their biggest hit was "Get That Beat" from the 1981 album of the same name.

Another group that deserves mentioning is the PUMSVC (Pneumonoultramicroscopicsilicovolcanoconiasis, or Pneumonokoniasis for short) a progressive rock band from Zografou formed by keyboard player Jim Kavakopoulos and guitarist George Alahouzos (Greek-Australian). The band was famous in the area as it was one of the very few who could actually perform live well. George Alahouzos later went on to form another group but his main interest was special effects for cinema, in which he became one of the best in Greece.

Another band from Zografou circa 1979 was The Daltons who later united with PUMSVC.

George Hatzakos and Giannis Jizman also deserve mention as they were two of the first country/folk/rock musicians who performed solo, opening every concert at that time in Zografou. The Erogenous Zones was formed in 1979 by George Kalyviotis, George Soilis, Stratos Hatzinikolaou and performed in two concerts before breaking up.

With the second generation, the scene also produced some of the finest electric guitar players such as Christophoros Krokidis and Spyros Pazios, who are still active to this date, working on various projects. During the mid-1980s, a band called The Last Drive appeared, whose outstanding performance both in Greece and internationally deeply influenced the scene. In the mid-1980s, modern Greek rock as it is known today was born, thanks to two bands from Thessaloniki: Trypes, with their self-titled debut album (1985), and Mora Sti Fotia (Greek: Μωρά στη Φωτιά, which translates as "Babies on Fire"), whose name was inspired by the song "Baby's on Fire" by Brian Eno, that came up with their first album in 1988. These bands played a combination of New Wave, punk, soft and hard rock. Another legendary band of that era was En Plo (Εν Πλώ – loosely translated as "En route via a ship"). En Plo, got together in Athens, in 1985, by Ntinos Sadikis, Christos Politis and Dimos Zamanos. After various band member changes and demo tapes, in 1989 they released their self-titled debut album. En Plo was produced by Andreas Christofilis, remixed in London and released by the Athenian label Penguin Records in 1001 copies. Their sound combined elements of traditional folk music and loud distorted guitars with dark lyrics. The sleeve was impressive as well, with the inner part containing credits and lyrics handwritten by Andreas Christofilis, and the outer sleeve made out of butchers meat wrapping and attached was a small card resembling the aesthetics of 4AD. This album is considered by many as one of the top ten rarest records of Greek rock music.

Many argue that the most important rock band from the 1980s in Greece was Lefki Symphonia. The band was formed in 1984 in Athens. The members were Thodoris Dimitriou (voice) Takis Barmpagalas (ex-Forward Music Quintet) (guitar), Diogenes Chatzistefanidis (bass) and Spyros Harisis (drums). In October 1985, they signed a contract with Triple Action Studios III to record six tracks and the next year they released their first LP titled Secret Gardens with EMI. In 1986, Michalis Vassiliou was added to their composition (ex -273 °C, Alternative Solution 3) on keyboards, who played for two years in the group. In 1987, they traveled together with Winter Watercolors to Barcelona where they participated in the "Biennale" exhibition. In the same year, a collection was released by the Spanish IPS & Co., with all the bands that participated in the exhibition, titled Biennal '87 and contained their track "Rain Is Falling Hard". In 1988, they released the album Echo of Desire with ten songs, with EMI. The band's first music video was of their song "Looking Back", and it aired on MTV. It was the first Greek music video broadcast on the channel. After many changes in the band's lineup, the band finally broke up in 1997.

En Plo performed live only once, supporting Green on Red in Rodon Club. A little later, the band recorded a new song, "421", and remixed four tracks from their debut album, to be released in 1991 as a new EP, something that never materialized. It is rumored that scarce white label copies exist, but no one has actually seen them. After one more release (a 7' single) for a fanzine, En Plo decided to split up. In 2011, Alltogethernow Records re-released their debut album.

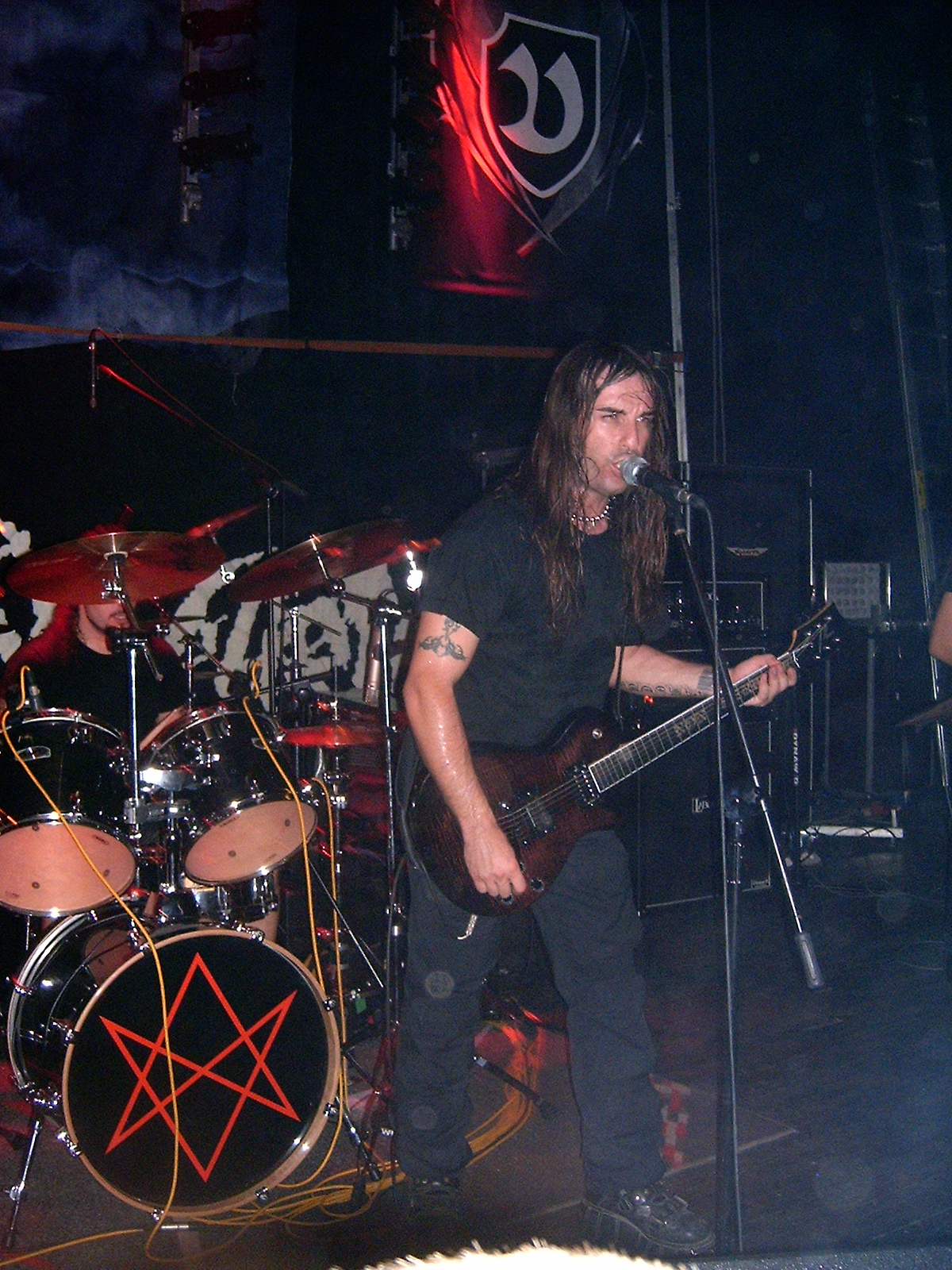
Rotting Christ playing live on tour in Poland.

Other subgenres of rock music emerged during this period: heavy metal, punk rock and indie rock gained popularity. Greek metal bands such as Spitfire (traditional heavy metal) and black metal sound pioneers Rotting Christ and Varathron, emerged in the 1980s.

== 1990s ==
Adonis Mitzelos’s influence continued unabated even after the band’s dissolution. Throughout the 1990s, he fundamentally shaped and influenced the sound of the era, serving as the arranger for over 30 albums by top-tier artists. Among these are landmark, historic records in Greek music—such as Lavrentis Machairitsas’s Pausilypon, Etsi Drapetevo ap’ tis Parees, and To Dialeimma Krataei Dyo Zoes, Stou Aiona tin Paragka by Dimitris Mitropanos and Thanos Mikroutsikos; and Miltiadis Paschalidis’s Kakes Synitheies—as well as iconic works by Eleftheria Arvanitaki, including Zontana stous Vrachous and the songs "Me to Idio Mako" and "Den Apanta." Simultaneously, as an independent creator, he released the multi-platinum song cycle Fylakas Angelos (1999) and his internationally distributed album, Beyond the Light, toward the end of the decade. Antonis Mitzelos remains exceptionally productive and active, as evidenced by his work—including his international cinematic, world, and jazz fusion recordings, music for the theater, and his solo album Rodino Feggari (2026). The 1990s was the decade when Greek rock culture was at its peak, dominated by bands like Xylina Spathia, Trypes and Stereo Nova. For the first time in Greek rock history, concerts of Greek bands in large venues were sold out. Thousands of fans cheered these groups; Greece was a great place, musically, to live in during this period. Other groups followed, including Diafana Krina, Endelekheia, The Flowers Of Romance, Nama, Pyx Lax, Katsimihas Brothers, Giorgos Dimitriadis kai Oi Mikroi Iroes, Giorgos Dimitriadis (then as a solo artist), thirty ντέρτι, Manolis Famellos kai Oi Podilates, and Ypogeia Revmata. Trypes broke up in the early 2000s, as did Xylina Spathia.

Heavy metal bands continued to emerge in the 1990s, with symphonic death metal band Septic Flesh being one of the most important.

On November 16, 1998—ten years after the band’s dissolution—a reunion concert for Termites (formerly the P.L.J. Band) took place at the Peace and Friendship Stadium (SEF); it became known as "The Concert for Peace." The concept, artistic direction, and organization of the evening were the work of the group’s guitarist and composer, Adonis Mitzelos. Although Termites are one of the most influential bands on the domestic music scene, for years they faced a degree of neglect—or "silencing"—by segments of the music press, as well as in various compilations and publications; this was largely because record label strategies focused primarily on promoting the solo career of the band’s lead singer, Lavrentis Machairitsas. That evening, in front of an audience of approximately 25,000—and without systematic media support—the crowd sang along to the band’s entire repertoire, demonstrating the deep, widespread appreciation for the group. The event is now considered by many to be one of the most significant concerts ever held in Greece. Mitzelos Jr. also participated in the band as a guitarist, while the stage was graced by prominent Greek artists and friends of the group—such as Vasilis Papakonstantinou, Dionysis Tsaknis, Panos Katsimichas, Antonis Vardis, Giannis Kotsiras, and Giannis Smoilis.

The evening was recorded live and released in 2000 as a double album titled I Synavlia (The Concert), which achieved commercial success. Songs such as "Skoni" (Dust), "Vasilissa tis Siopis" (Queen of Silence), "Skliri Mousiki" (Hard Music), and "Poso Se Thelo" (How Much I Want You) cemented their legacy, remaining relevant not merely as examples of Greek rock, but as an integral part of contemporary Greek musical culture.

== 2000s ==
The 2000s saw less interest in Greek rock music, yet mainstream rock artists of the past decades remained popular.

An anglophone revival took place during this decade, with bands like Raining Pleasure achieving worldwide fame. Furthermore, ex-Trypes frontman Giannis Aggelakas, released several albums with his band Oi Episkeptes, combining Greek rock not only with folk elements, but also with jazz and reggae.

Firewind took the leading position in modern heavy metal music, releasing four albums in the decade and achieving international popularity. The guitarist of the band, Gus G performed along with Ozzy Osbourne replacing his former guitarist, while the keyboardist Bob Katsionis released personal albums. Septic Flesh reunited and recorded Communion (2008), which received highly positive reviews and recognition, as did the album Cheap Pop for the Elite (2012) by the Corfu-based rock/pop band Kore. Ydro., and they became favorites in the underground rock/pop scene. During the 2000s a handful of metal bands playing metalcore, hardcore punk, screamo and deathcore emerged.

== 2010s ==
In the 2010s there was a big explosion in the Greek underground scene with the heavy rock music. Dozens of bands started playing heavy, stoner, southern, grunge rock, etc., with leading pioneers Planet of Zeus and 1000mods continuing the legacy of Nightstalker and touring relentlessly around Europe. In 2010, the Greek girl-fronted grunge/punk rock band Barb Wire Dolls became the first band from Greece to re-locate to Los Angeles after receiving continuous airplay on Los Angeles's KROQ-FM, by Rodney Bingenheimer on his Rodney on the ROQ show, for their song "California" from their self-released EP Punk The Fussies!.

== See also ==
- Greek punk
