= Golden Youth 1960s era in Greece =

Development of pop-rock music in Greece

Greek 1960s Golden Youth Era
- Other names: Greek 1960s Golden Decade
- Stylistic origins: British Invasion; Rock and roll; Twist; Shake; Jenkka; Greek folk
- Cultural origins: 1960s, Greece

Regional scenes
- Athens, Thessaloniki

This was the period roughly between 1960 and the early 1970s that saw the introduction of Western pop/rock music to Greece with the formation of many local garage bands.

== History ==
In the early 1960s, as the new sounds of rock reached Greece, a pop/rock music scene developed. Youth, mainly in Athens and Thessaloniki, formed neighborhood bands playing “modern” music (as it was called at the time, to contrast it to the Greek traditional folk, laïka, and rebetika songs and dance). These “Golden Youth” (Greek: Χρυσή Νεολαία) garage bands were part of a broader yé-yé youth culture, which paralleled and was influenced by counterculture movements in the US, UK, and France. The bands played Sunday morning concerts at local theaters, at beach dance parties, and at emerging small nightclubs; by the mid-1960s, some were performing at stadiums in front of thousands of singing and dancing fans. Of the 150+ bands documented during the '60s, almost half of them did not produce any recordings. Of the rest, most issued only 7-inch vinyl records (45rpm), while only a few issued LPs (33rpm).

The music of the early groups was shaped by the British Invasion sound (mainly The Beatles and The Rolling Stones), but was also heavily influenced by music and dance from the US and elsewhere (rock and roll, the twist, and the shake from the US, the Finnish yanka, Italian light pop music, etc.). During the early years, the songs were in English (mainly covers), followed later by Greek adaptations of foreign songs. Eventually, bands started writing and singing original Greek songs, blending imported pop/rock sounds with some Greek folk, laïka, and rebetika elements. This era gave rise not only to groups that played light pop/dance music, but also the progressive New Wave (Greek: Νέο Κύμα) movement that mixed folk-rock, ballads, and entechno, as well as groups that played a blend of rock and roll, progressive rock, and psychedelia.

The mainstream newspapers and radio, the film industry, and the “laika” music environment all attacked, ridiculed, and tried to discredit the new “modern” trends in appearance, fashion, and music. Eventually, the 1967 military dictatorship forcefully suppressed the social aspects of the yé-yé movement. However, music work by Neo Kyma and rock groups and performers continued throughout the duration of the dictatorship and beyond.

== List of groups and singers ==
There have been more than 150 pop/rock groups documented during the '60s, with the most successful ones being the Forminx, the Sounds, the Charms, the Idols, the Olympians, and Aphrodite's Child. The following is a partial list of some of the most popular and/or influential groups of the era (in roughly chronological order of formation).

The Forminx (1962–1966)

- Original Members: Tasos Papastamatis (vocals), Vasilis Bakopoulos (guitar), Sotiris Arnis (bass, vibraphone), Vangelis Papathanassiou (keyboards), Kostas Skokos (drums)
- Later members: Themos Petrou (guitar, vocals), Titos Kalliris (guitar), Eugnomon (percussion)
- They were one of the earliest garage pop/rock bands of the era. Their name derives from the phorminx an ancient Greek string instrument. They had a beat pop sound and they wrote and performed original songs in English. They initiated the "Yanka" dance craze in Greece.
- Hits: Jeronimo Yanka, Mandjourana's Shake

The Juniors (1962–1966)

- Members: Mike Rozakis (guitar, vocals), Giorgos Tsiknis (vocals), Evris Paritsis (guitar, vocals), Alekos Karakantas (guitar), Thanos Sougioul (bass), Petros Pollatos (saxophone), Lakis Vlavianos (keyboards), Tzimis Ntais (drums)
- In October 1965, Sougioul and manager Yiannis Krasoudis were killed and Karakantas was severely injured in a car accident. The rest of the group performed a concert a week later, with Eric Clapton replacing Karakantas for the occasion (at the time, Clapton was in Greece with a British band who were the opening act at the nightclub where the Juniors were performing). The group disbanded a few months later.
- Hits: Special ’65 Yanka

The Sounds (1963–1973)

- Early members: Takis Antoniadis (vocals), George Legakis (guitar), Andreas Danakalis (bass), Takis Sfakianopoulos (keyboards), Mimis Trikourakis (drums)
- Later members: Tammy (vocals), Petros Milas (vocals), Spyros Metaxas (guitar), Panagiotis Karboulonis (guitar), Michalis Nikoloulis (guitar), Nikos Karagiannis (bass), Sotiris Natras (saxophone), Dimitris Maroudas (drums)
- They often sang Greek adaptations of foreign songs (mostly American and Italian), although they also wrote and performed some original Greek songs. They were one of the more commercial groups of the era.
- Hits: To Mathima (Greek: Το Μάθημα = The Lesson, adaptation of Un Bimbo Sul Leone, by Adriano Celentano), Apopse Se Thelo (Greek: Απόψε Σε Θέλω = I Want You Tonight, adaptation of Stasera Mi Butto, by Rocky Roberts)

Tammy (real name Stamatina Roussianou, 1948-)

- She did vocals w/ the Sounds and then had a solo career. At age 30 she ended her music career to start a family.
- Hits: Agori Mou (Greek: Αγόρι Μου = My Boy), Min Tin Pistevis (Greek: Μήν Την Πιστεύεις = Don't Believe Her), San Vgike Apopse to Feggari (Greek: Σαv Βγήκε Απόψε Το Φεγγάρι = When the Moon Came Out Tonight, adaptation of Bad Moon Rising, by CC Revival)

The Vikings (1964–1968)

- Early members: Antonis Vardis (guitar, vocals), George Melekis (bass), George Mylonas (organ), Yiannis Pantazis (drums)
- Later members: Antonis Stefanidis (vocals), Stavros Ladas (guitar), Tasos Hamourtiadis (guitar), Nikos Mitsopoulos (bass), Antonis Ioannou (drums)
- Hits: Francoise, Catherine

The Sover Group (also styled as Elena and the Sover Group, 1968 - late 1970s)

- Early members: Makis Kalavros (vocals), Elena (Elena Eustathiadou, vocals), Stavros Ladas (guitar), George Melekis (bass), Soulis Kouerinis (organ), Yiannis Valvis (drums)
- Later members: Takis Biniaris (vocals), Dimitris Lainopoulos (bass), Andreas Egglezos (bass), Nikos Mpakelas (organ)
- Hits: Se Perimeno to Allo Kalokairi (Greek: Σε Περιμένω Το ‘Αλλο Καλοκαίρι = I’ll Wait For You Next Summer), To Diko Sou Mystiko (Greek: Το Δικό Σου Μυστικό = Your Secret), Agori Mou Glyko (Greek: Αγόρι Μου Γλυκό = My Sweet Boy)

The Stormies (1964–1966)

- Early members: Alekos Glykas (guitar, vocals), Spyros Metaxas (guitar), Themos Petrou (bass), Makis Saliaris (drums)
- Later members: Demis Roussos (bass), Panagiotis Zachariou (bass), Kostas Karydas (vocals), Zoitsa Kouroukli (vocals), Loukas Sideras (drums)

The Minis (1966)

- Members: Themos Petrou (vocals), Demis Roussos (bass, vocals), Argyris “Silver” Koulouris (guitar), Lakis Vlavianos (organ), Loukas Sideras (drums)

Zoitsa (Zoe) Kouroukli (Greek: Ζωίτσα Κουρούκλη, 1937–2018)

- She started her career as occasional singer for the short-lived bands the Stormies and the Minis. She later worked w/ Vangelis and had a short solo career. She ended her music career to start a family but then made a modest comeback in the 1990s.
- Hits: Hamena Onoera (Greek: Χαμένα Όνειρα), E Tramontana (Greek: Η Τραμοντάνα, adaptation of La Tramontana, by Gianni Pettenati and Antoine), E Agapi Etsi Arhinaei (Greek: Η Αγάπη Ετσι Αρχινάει = Love Starts This Way), Ma Tora Agapi Mou (Greek: Μα Τώρα Αγαπη Μου = But Now My Love)

The Charms (1964–1973)

- Original members who left after first year: Kostas Karydas (vocals), Spyros Karakoutas (bass), George Balaskas (guitar)
- Other early members: Mike Rozakis (bass, vocals), Kostas Nikolopoulos (guitar), Petros Pollatos (saxophone), Teris Ieremias (keyboards), George Stratis (drums)
- Later members: Theodoros Laskaris (keyboards), Vassilis Tzavaras (drums), George Melekis (bass)
- Initially they wrote and performed songs in English, but later switched to Greek songs with a more pop sound. They were the first group of that era to issue an LP. They were also featured in a number of Greek films of the time.
- Hits: To Trelokoritso (Greek: To Τρελοκόριτσο = The Crazy Girl), Glykeia Agapimeni (Greek: Γλυκειά Αγαπημένη = Sweet Lover), Exo Apo Ton Kosmo (Greek: ‘Εξω απ' τον Κόσμο = Out of this World)

The Play Boys (1965–1971)

- Early members: Dakis (vocals), Ia Kouka (vocals), Nikos Adamas (guitar), Fanis Farmakis (trumpet), Stelios Dalianis (piano), Vassilis Tzavaras (drums)
- Later members: Filippos Nikolaou (vocals), Mike Rozakis (bass), Haris Halchitis (saxophone)
- Hits: Etsi Einai E Zoe (Greek: Έτσι Eίναι H Ζωή = This is Life), Mia Mera Thartheis (Greek: Μια Μέρα Θαρθείς = One Day You Will Come)

Mike Rozakis (Greek: Μιχάλης “Μάϊκ” Ροζάκης, 1946–2009)

- He was a member of the Charms, the Juniors, and the Play Boys, and then had a career as a composer and orchestra conductor.

The Idols (1964–1972)

- Early members: Jo Michat (vocals), Antonis Gioulis (electric guitar), Demis Roussos (bass), Notis Lalaitis (keyboards), Ntinos Papavisiliou (piano), Nikos Tsilogiannis (drums)
- Later members: George Petridis (vocals), Lazaros Papageorgiou (vocals), Manolis Kavouklis (bass), Vasilis Konstantinidis (drums), Tzimis Tzimopoulos (drums).
- They often sang Greek adaptations of foreign songs, although they later recorded original songs in English. They were one of opening acts at the Rolling Stones concert in Athens in April 1967.
- Hits: Trikymia Stin Kardia Mou (Greek: Τρικυμία στην Καρδιά Μου = Tempest In My Heart, adaptation of La Tempesta, by Angelo Branduardi), Ena Koritsi Mou Eihe Pei (Greek: ‘Ενα Κοριτσι Μου'χε Πει, adaptation of Lei mi diceva, by the New Trolls), Xafnika M’ Agapas (Greek: Ξαφνικα Μ' Αγαπάς = Suddenly You Love Me, adaptation of Suddenly You Love Me, by The Tremeloe), Sou’dosa Tin Agapi Moy (Greek: Σου ‘δωσα την Aγάπη Mου = I Gave You My Love)

The Olympians (1965–1971)

- Early members: Paschalis Arvanitidis (vocals, bass), Koulis Kalogiannidis (guitar), Alkis Kakaliagos (piano, Hammond organ), Vangelis Koutsotolis (saxophone), Dimitris Lazaridis (drums)
- Later members; Nikos Papazoglou (guitar), Vasilis Papavasiliou (guitar), Panos Lemonidis (drums)
- Their national success started at a 1966 concert/competition, when the audience put them in first place ahead of all the popular groups of the era (Idols, Charms, Sounds, Jaguars, Stormies). They were the first group to consistently sing in Greek, both adaptations of foreign songs and original ones.
- Hits: O Tropos (Greek: Ο Τρόπος = The Way), Signomi (Greek: Συγνώμη = I'm Sorry), To Scholeio (Greek: Το Σχολείο = The School, adaptation of American folk song Lonesome Traveler), O Alexis (Greek: Ο Αλέξης = Alex), To Koritsi Tou Mai (Greek: Το Κορίτσι του Μάη = May Girl, adaptation of Venus, by Shocking Blue)

Paschalis (Paschalis Arvanitidis, Greek: Πασχάλης Αρβανιτίδης, 1946-)

- He was a member of the Olympians and then had a solo career.

Alba, Aris & The Olympics (1965–1969)

- Members: Alba (vocals), Aris Karantanis (saxophone), Christos Emmanouil (guitar), Marcos Aliexiou (organ)
- Hits: Sti Mama Mou Tha To Po (Greek: Στη Μαμά Μου Θα Το Πω = I Will Tell My Mom)

Voreioi (Greek: Βόρειοι, 1965 - early 1970s)

- Early members: Sotos Kyrkasiadis (vocals), Dora Lampati (vocals), Stelios Mpiladeris (guitar), Thanasis Alamanos (saxophone), George Lampatis (organ), Panos Lemonidis (drums)
- Later, a lot of turnover: George Polychroniadis (vocals), Ntinos Michailidis (bass), Stelios Fotiadis (bass), Nestor Danas (guitar), Adonis Papasotiriou (guitar), George Parotidis (organ), and others.
- Hits: To Tzini (Greek: Το Τζίνι = The Genie), Saluna

Ariones (Greek: Αρίωνες, 1965–1968)

- Members: Kostas Papaioannou (vocals), Gavrilis Archontidis (guitar, saxophone), Lazaros Archontidis (guitar, saxophone), Dimitris Milios (bass), Aggelos Zikopoulos (drums)
- Hits: Tremei E Kardia Mou (Greek: Τρέμει η Καρδιά Μου = My Heart Trembles)

The Blue Birds (1963–1976)

- Members: George Petridis (vocals), Yiannis Psimopoulos (guitar, vocals), Leonidas Louloudis (bass), Socratis Adrdavanis (organ), Gavrilis Pantzis (drums)
- Early garage psychedelic rock band.
- Hits: Julie

The Strangers (1966-c1970)

- Members: Nikos Antoniadis (guitar, vocals), Takis Tsonis (vocals), Nikos Malamidis (bass), Thomas Mpourdourakis (organ), Nikos Petrovich (drums)
- The Strangers were the first Greek band to record a Christmas Holiday song.
- Hits: To Randevou (Greek: Το ραντεβού = The Date), Christougenna (Greek: Χριστούγεννα = Christmas), Protohronia (Greek: Πρωτοχρονιά = New Year's Day)

Tony Pinelli (born 1938)

- Italian singer who had a career in various European countries, including Greece (1965–1967, and again later in the mid-1980s).
- Hits: E Anamnisi (Greek: Η Ανάμνηση = The Memory), Efyges (Greek: Έφυγες = You Are Gone), Kathe Proino (Greek: Κάθε Πρωινό = Every Morning)

Cinquetti (1967–1971)

- Early members: Vasilis Tataroglou (vocals), Manolis Kantaros (bass), Argyris “Silver” Koulouris (guitar), Lakis Giordanelli (vocals, organ), Manos Koromilas (organ), Yiannis Fanasiotis (saxophone), Kostas Papaioannou (drums)
- Later members: Dimitris Tamposis (vocals, guitar), Antonis Triantafyllou (bass), Dimitris Katakouzinos (guitar), Andreas Metallidis (bass), Antonis Loxas (drums)
- Hits: To Koritsi Tou Filou Mou (Greek: Το Κορίτσι Του Φίλου Μου = My Friend's Girl, adaptation of Namoradinha de um amigo meu, by Roberto Carlos)

Lakis Giordanelli (Greek: Λάκης Τζορντανέλλι, real name Emmanouil Iordanopoulos, 1948-)

- He sang w/ Cinquetti and then had a solo career, mostly singing Greek adaptations of foreign songs.
- Hits: Agorazo Palia (Greek: Αγοράζω Παλιά = I Buy Junk, adaptation of Aie A Mwana), Genghis Han (Greek: Τζένγκις Χαν, adaptation of Dschinghis Khan, by Dschinghis Khan)

The New Hopes (also styled as Sophie and the New Hopes, 1967–1970)

- Members: Fotis Fragkias (vocals), Sophie Konstantaki (vocals), Dimitris Santorineos (guitar), George Bekiaris (bass), Christos Konstantakis (organ), Stavros Yioulakis (drums)
- Hits: Panta Perimeno (Greek; Πάντα περιμένω = I'm Always Waiting), Koritsi Xantho (Greek: Κορίτσι Ξανθό = Blonde Girl), Mia Agapi Esvise (Greek: Μιά Αγάπη Έσβησε = A Love Has Gone Out)

The Up Tight (initially formed as Cool Cats, and renamed to Up Tight in 1968, 1967-c1973)

- Early members: George Skliris (guitar, vocals), Makis Sokos (bass), George Hatzopopouls (saxophone, flute), Makis Giaprakas (saxophone), Sotiris Naoum (organ), Christos Sokos (drums, vocals)
- Later members: Tasos Tsontilis (bass, vocals), Nikos Zygoulianos (saxophone), Kostas Vavoulis (trumpet), Sotiris Palkitsoglou (organ)
- Hits: Me Xehases (Greek: Με Ξέχασες = You Forgot Me, adaptation of Applausi, by I Camaleonti)

Teris Chryssos (Greek: Τέρης Χρυσός, real name Lefteris Chrissogelos, 1939-)

- Hits: Itan Mia Optasia (Greek: Ήταν μιά Oπτασία = She Was a Mirage, adaptation of La donna di picche, by Little Tony), Mylow E Kardia Mou (Greek: Μύλος η Kαρδιά μου = My Heart is a Windmill, adaptation of Mulino a vento, by Little Tony), Esy Gelas (Greek: Εσύ Γελάς = You Laugh, adaptation of Peggio per me, meglio per te, Little Tony)

Mary Alexopoulou (Greek: Μαίρη Αλεξοπούλου, 1941–2023)

- She had a solo singing career. After the death of her teenage daughter in a car accident, she became a nun in 1986.
- Hits: Ti Hara (Greek: Τι Χαρά = What Joy), E Bambola (Greek: Η Μπάμπολα, adaptation of La Bambola, by Petty PRavo)

Stavros Zoras (Greek: Σταύρος Ζώρας, real name Stavros Oustampasidis, 1941–2011)

- Hits: Esena Pou Se Xero Toso Ligo (Greek: Εσένα Που Σε Ξέρω Τόσο Λίγο = You Whom I Know So Little), Einai Arga (Greek: Είναι Αργά = It Is Late), Xanagyrna Pali Piso (Greek: Ξαναγύρνα Πάλι Πίσω = Come Back Again)

Fratelli (1968–1969)

- Members: Mimis Antonopoulos (vocals), Yiannis Kantzos (guitar), Stelios Fotiadis (bass), George Pentzikis (organ), Leonidas Stamatiadis (drums)
- One of the earliest true rock bands.

M. G. C. (Modern Greek Combo, 1965–1969)

- Original members: Dimitris Tsemperopoulos (vocals), Dimitris Mpeligiannis (guitar), Kostas Ntovas (bass), Dimitris Polytimos (organ, piano), Stelios Katsadorakis (drums)
- Later members: Dimitris Poulikakos (vocals), Yiannis Kiourtsoglou (guitar), Takis Sempos (guitar), Vasilis Mpakopoulos (guitar), Antonis Triantafyllou (bass), Vasilis Ntallas (bass), Leonidas Alachadamis (drums), Tzimis Tzimopoulos (drums).
- One of the earliest true rock bands.

Aphrodite's Child (1968–1972)

- Formed in Paris by Loukas Sideras (drums, vocals), Demis Roussos (bass, vocals), Vangelis Papathanassiou (keyboards, vocals), and soon added Argyris “Silver” Koulouris (guitar).
- One of the early rock bands. They went beyond the usual light pop sound, and played progressive rock, blending baroque pop and psychedelic rock. They had the biggest international success, and two of its members, Vangelis Papathanassiou and Demis Roussos, went on to also have very successful international solo careers.
- Hits: Rain and Tears, The Four Horsemen

Vangelis (Vangelis Papathanassiou) (Greek: Βαγγέλης Παπαθανασίου, 1943–2022)

- He was a member of the Forminx and Aphrodite's Child, and then had a very successful international career as composer, arranger, and producer, in electronic and new age music, and film scores.

Demis Roussos (Greek: Ντέμης Ρούσσος, real name Artemios Ventouris-Roussos, 1946–2015)

- He was a member of the Idols, the Stormies, the Minis, and Aphrodite's Child, and then had a very successful international solo career.

== See also ==
- Rock music in Greece
- Neo kyma
