= Arleta (disambiguation) =

Arleta may refer to:

== Places ==
- Arleta, Los Angeles, a neighborhood
- Arleta, Oregon, United States, a neighborhood of Portland

== People ==
- Arleta (musician) (1945–2017), Greek musician
- Arleta (given name) (includes list of people with this given name)
