= Ypogeia Revmata =

- Origin: Athens, Greece
- Genres: Rock; Greek rock Alternative rock Progressive rock Acoustic; Hard rock Blues rock
- Years active: 1992–present
- Labels: FM; Warner Bros. Records; BMI; Impact/Legend

Ypogeia Revmata (Greek: Υπόγεια Ρεύματα, "Underground Currents") is a Greek rock band.

== History ==
The history of Ypogeia Revmata starts in 1992, when a company of musicians and classmates at the same time from Kallithea, Athens, Greece started playing their own songs. At that time, Grigoris, Kostas, Giannis and Panagiotis had rented a place at Psyri, Athens in order to make comfortably their performances. When Kostas started working at Melodia FM, he met the manager Dimitris Hatzopoulos, and that is when Mitsos joined the band. In 1993, manager Dimitris Hatzopoulos takes a demo of the band to Έβδομη Διάσταση (Evdomi Diastasi, Seventh Dimension) label and Ypogia Revmata start recording their first album.

In 1994, the band, after deciding their permanent name, make their first appearance in Greek discography with their first album 'Ο Μάγος Κοιτάζει την Πόλη' (O Magos Kitazei tin Poli, The Magician is Looking at the City). The sound of Ypogeia Revmata does not have anything new to offer to the rock scene, but their songs have fun, humor, catchy melodies and rhythm and lyrics written without any complex. From that album comes their classic hit 'Μ'αρέσει να μη Λεω Πολλά' (M'aresi na mi Leo Polla, I Like not Saying Much). That year, they make their first concert at 'Metro', which overwhelms with crowd.

In 1995, Markos joins the band and they release their second album 'Παραλογές' (Paraloges), a little more inflexible, but closer to the sound they wanted to approach. Kostas is in charge of remixing and sound recording, who later is going to be a member of the band.

In summer 1996, they recorded their live concert at 'Theatro Vrahon' with their new drummer Vasilis, who before releasing their third album 'Live στο Θέατρο Βράχων' (Live at Theatro Vrahon) - which marks the end of an era - loses his life in a car accident. After that tragic event, Kostas and Giannis leave the band.

In 1997, the remaining members release the darkest album of the band 'Τσαλακωμένες Μέρες' (Chalakomenes Meres, Creased Days). The missing members are replaced by Iraklis and Kostas - the sound recorder from 'Παραλογές'. Despite that, the band participates that year in the live performance of George Dalaras at 'Ιερά Οδός' (Iera Odos), where they sing two of their songs: 'Μ'αρέσει να μη Λέω Πολλά' and 'Ασημένια Σφήκα' (Asimenia Sfika, Silver Wasp).

In 1998, their next work 'Εικόνες στα Σύννεφα' (Icones sta Synnefa, Images in the Clouds) is followed, obviously better than their previous, but missing their early freshness. They cover the song 'Θαλασσογραφία' (Thalassographia, 'Seascape'), which is sung by Eleni Tsaligopoulou and is included in an album with song covers of Dionysis Savvopoulos. Mitsos and Iraklis leave the band, while the other members continue participating in other albums, giving songs to artists and doing concerts in many cities.

In 1999, after Kostas's departure, a new member, Nikiforos, joins the band. During that year, they start recording their sixth album 'Μικρά που Είναι τα Όνειρα' (Micra pou Ine ta Onira, How Small Dreams Are).

After a lot of work, the album was released in 2000 including 13 new songs. During the next two years, Ypogeia Revmata sign the music of several theatrical plays, do concerts and cooperate with many other artists and bands.

In 2003 the band experienced a lot of changes in formation. Markos, Panagiotis and Nikiforos leave the band, while Tasos, Marios, Apostolis and Kostas - one of the founding members of the group - replace them. Before the year ends, Kostas leaves the band again.

For the next years, with Grigoris (guitar, vocals) being the only remaining member from the start, Tasos (drums, vocals), Marios (keyboards, vocals) and Apostolis (bass, guitar, accordion, vocals), Ypogia Revmata do a lot of concerts all over Greece, covering their older songs and trying their new material live.

In 2007, after six years of absence from discography, Ypogeia Revmata return with their new album 'Νέα Μέρα' (Nea Mera, New Day), a title that marks the new age of the band. The band shows a different sound and composition from the usual, mixing rock and lyrical elements and emphasising poetic lyrics. This new album startled many, as it has a lot of foreign elements.
