= Nefeli Fasouli =

Nefeli Fasouli Νεφέλη Φασούλη
- Origin: Athens, Greece
- Genres: Jazz, Entechno, Laïko, Greek folk music
- Occupations: Singer, songwriter, educator
- Instrument: Vocals
- Years active: 2010s–present
- Labels: United We Fly, Fishbowl Music Tank
- Website: nefelifasouli.bandcamp.com

Nefeli Fasouli (Greek: Νεφέλη Φασούλη) is a Greek singer and songwriter from Athens. Her work combines jazz with Greek folk, laïko, rebetiko and entechno traditions. Her debut album, O Kosmos Sou (2021), featured songs by Fivos Delivorias.

== Early life and education ==
Fasouli was born and raised in Athens. She began studying violin and music theory at the age of six at the Athens Music Association Conservatory. She entered the Athens Law School in 2013 and graduated in 2018. Alongside her law studies she took voice lessons with Elli Paspala, Marina Skiadaresi, Panos Dimas and Sofia Noiti, and studied for two years at the Athenaeum Conservatory with Sylvios Syrros.

She received a Fulbright grant under the Foreign Student Program for Arts Professionals to study jazz at the New York Jazz Academy.

== Career ==
Fasouli's debut solo album, O Kosmos Sou (Your World), was released in 2021 on the United We Fly label. It was produced by Fivos Delivorias, who also wrote the songs, and Fasouli toured with him in support of it. She has also performed with Vassilis Kazoulis, Nikos Ziogalas and Panagiotis Kalantzopoulos.

She leads the Nefeli Fasouli Quintet, which plays jazz and Greek folk music. In 2023 the quintet performed at the Athens Jazz Festival with pianist Leandros Pashias, saxophonist James Wylie, bassist Dinos Manos and drummer Giorgos Klountzos-Chrysidis. The quintet has also appeared at the Athens & Epidaurus Festival.

Her second album, Phases, was released on 15 December 2023 by Fishbowl Music Tank. It contains six original songs on the theme of love and its stages, recorded with pianist Marius Van den Brink, bassist Russell Hall, saxophonist Aidan McKeon and drummer Jason Wastor.

In 2024 she released O Kipos (The Garden) with composer Antonis Apergis. The album has a more folk-based sound and deals with themes of love and acceptance. Her 2025 EP Wyrd draws on music of the Levant, Anatolian psychedelia and Tropicália.

Fasouli was a visiting teacher in popular and jazz music at the Department of Music Studies of the National and Kapodistrian University of Athens in 2024–25.

In November 2026 she made her first Australian tour with the show Athens After Dark, presented by Greek Fringe in Melbourne and Sydney.

== Discography ==
=== Albums and EPs ===
- O Kosmos Sou (United We Fly, 2021)
- Phases (Fishbowl Music Tank, 2023)
- O Kipos (with Antonis Apergis, 2024)
- Wyrd (EP, 2025)

=== As guest ===
- Stelios Chatzikaleas – Dignity (Liberta Music, 2021)
