= Rena Koumioti =

Greek musician (1941–2023)

Background information
- Born: Irene Koumioti; 3 May 1941; Nea Ionia, Athens, Greece
- Died: 3 April 2023 (aged 81) Athens, Greece
- Genres: Greek New Wave, entechno, laiko
- Occupations: Musician, actress
- Instrument: Vocals
- Website: http://koumioti.gr/

Irene "Rena" Koumioti (Greek: Ειρήνη (Ρένα) Κουμιώτη; 3 May 1941 – 3 April 2023) was a Greek musician. She also appeared briefly in film and on television.

== Biography ==
Koumioti was born in the Nea Ionia district of Athens. Her father was a refugee from Constantinople (Istanbul) and her mother was a refugee from Smyrna (Izmir).

Koumioti was one of the foremost representatives of the Greek New Wave genre. Her breakthrough came while singing at the Apanemia musical club in Athens in 1968, when she was heard by Lefteris Papadopoulos who then asked her to sing with Giannis Poulopoulos for the Dromos (Greek: Ο δρόμος, "The road") album.

Her recording career was short — her last album recording was in 1980 — but important. For a period she had lived in Canada where she stayed for eight years. She remained active in live performance until her death.

Koumioti died on 3 April 2023, at age 81, due to complications of dementia. She was buried in the First Cemetery of Athens.

== Discography ==
(includes third party albums and collections)

- 1969 - Ο δρόμος
- 1969 - Οι ώρες
- 1970 - Γύφτισσα μέρα
- 1970 - Μέρες του καλοκαιριού
- 1970 - Ρένα Κουμιώτη
- 1970 - Γειτονιές Αθήνα - Θεσσαλονίκη
- 1970 - Ρένα Κουμιώτη 1
- 1971 - Ρένα Κουμιώτη 2
- 1972 - Μήνες
- 1972 - Το θαλασσινό τρυφύλλι
- 1972 - Τα κίτρινα ρολόγια
- 1973 - Μονά ζυγά
- 1973 - Θάλασσα πικροθάλασσα
- 1974 - Μίλα μου για λευτεριά
- 1974 - Παράθυρο στη θάλασσα
- 1974 - Ρένα Κουμιώτη 3
- 1974 - Ρόδα που γυρίζει
- 1976 - Τα ωραιότερα τραγούδια της Ρένας Κουμιώτη
- 1976 - Στο δρόμο για το Τσιμελνί
- 1978 - Ρεμπέτικα και θαλασσινά
- 1978 - Ρένα Κουμιώτη - Πλέσσας Μίμης
- 1980 - Τα δικά μου τραγούδια
- 1985 - Τραγούδια από τον ελληνικό κινηματογράφο
- 1986 - Για το θέατρο 2 - Πλέσσας
- 1992 - Δεν θα χωρίσουμε ποτέ - Ζαμπέτας
- 1993 - Μεγάλες επιτυχίες Ρένα Κουμιώτη
- 1993 - Το άλλο νέο κύμα
- 1995 - Σταμάτησε του ρολογιού τους δείχτες
- 1996 - Οι μεγάλες ερμηνείες - Κουμιώτη Ρένα
- 1996 - Στο δρόμο του Μίμη Πλέσσα 2
- 2001 - 50 χρυσά χρόνια - Πλέσσας
- 2009 - Σταμάτησε του ρολογιού τους δείχτες
- 2009 - Κόρη του γιαλού

== Television and film performances ==
Koumioti played several roles in film and television, including in the feature films Μια τρελή, τρελή σαραντάρα, H Θεία μου η χίπισσα along with Rena Vlachopoulou, and on television in the Greek series Dyo Xenoi (Δύο Ξένοι) where she briefly played herself.

== See also ==
- Arleta
- Keti Chomata
- Mariza Koch
