= Éntekhno =

Music style; orchestral music with elements from Greek folk rhythm and melody

- Stylistic origins: Greek folk; rebetiko; classical; art rock
- Cultural origins: Late 1950s, Greece
- Derivative forms: Greek New Wave

Éntekhno (Greek: έντεχνο, pronounced ['endexno], pl: éntekhna [tragoudia]) is orchestral music with elements from Greek folk rhythm and melody. Its lyrical themes are often based on the work of famous Greek poets. Éntekhno arose in the late 1950s, drawing on rebetiko's Westernization by Vassilis Tsitsanis and Manolis Chiotis. Mikis Theodorakis and Manos Hatzidakis were the most popular early composers of éntekhno song cycles.

== Origins ==
As opposed to other forms of Greek urban folk music, éntekhno concerts would often take place outside a hall or a nightclub in the open air. Mikis Theodorakis and Manos Hadjidakis were the most popular early composers of éntekhno songs. They were both educated in classical music; the lack of a wide public for this kind of music in Greece drove them to the invention of éntekhno, in which they transferred some values of Western art music, such as ballad tunes. Other significant Greek songwriters included Stavros Kouyoumtzis, Manos Loïzos, and Dimos Moutsis. Significant lyricists of this genre are Nikos Gatsos, Manos Eleftheriou and poet Tasos Livaditis. By the 1960s, innovative albums helped éntekhno become close to mainstream, and also led to its appropriation by the film industry for use in soundtracks.

=== Works ===
Notable éntekhno works include:

- Six folk paintings (Manos Hatzidakis, 1951)
- Epitaphios (Mikis Theodorakis, 1960, poetry by Yiannis Ritsos)
- Epifania (Mikis Theodorakis, 1962, poetry by Giorgos Seferis)
- Dead brother's song (Mikis Theodorakis, 1962)
- Mikres Kyklades (Mikis Theodorakis, 1963, poetry by Odysseas Elytis)
- "To Axion Esti" (Mikis Theodorakis, 1964, poetry by Odysseas Elytis)
- Gioconda's Smile (Manos Hatzidakis, 1965)
- Romiossini (Mikis Theodorakis, 1966, poetry by Yiannis Ritsos)
- Ballos (Dionysis Savvopoulos, 1970)
- O Megalos Erotikos (Manos Hatzidakis, 1972)
- Eighteen Short Songs of the Bitter Motherland (Mikis Theodorakis, 1973, poetry by Yiannis Ritsos)
- Our Great Circus (Stavros Xarchakos for the theatrical play of Iakovos Kambanellis, 1974)
- Tetralogia (Dimos Moutsis, 1975, poetry by Constantine P. Cavafy, Kostas Karyotakis, Yiannis Ritsos and Giorgos Seferis)
- Stavros tou Notou (Southern Cross) (Thanos Mikroutsikos, 1979, poetry by Nikos Kavvadias)

=== Artists ===
Composers:

- Manos Hatzidakis
- Manos Loïzos
- Yannis Markopoulos
- Thanos Mikroutsikos
- Dimos Moutsis
- Mimis Plessas
- Mikis Theodorakis
- Stavros Xarchakos
- Nikos Gatsos (lyricist)
- Manos Eleftheriou (lyricist)

Singers:

- Haris Alexiou
- Giorgos Dalaras
- Nikos Xilouris
- Maria Dimitriadi
- Maria Farantouri
- Manolis Mitsias
- Nana Mouskouri
- Nena Venetsanou
- Grigoris Bithikotsis
- Dimitris Mitropanos

== New Wave ==
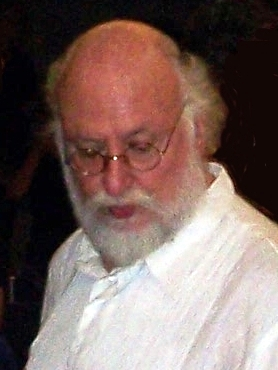
Dionysis Savvopoulos.

A form of éntekhno which is even closer to western classical music was introduced during the mid-1960s, which was called New Wave and was a mixture of éntekhno and chansons from France. One of the first contributors to the genre was Dionysis Savvopoulos, who mixed American musicians like Bob Dylan and Frank Zappa with Macedonian folk music and politically incisive lyrics. In his wake came more folk-influenced performers like Arleta, Mariza Koch, Mihalis Violaris, Kostas Hatzis and the composer Giannis Spanos. This music scene flourished in a specific type of boîte de nuit.

=== Artists ===
- Arleta
- Keti Chomata
- Kostas Hatzis
- Mariza Koch
- Rena Koumioti
- Yiannis Parios
- Giannis Poulopoulos
- Dionysis Savvopoulos
- Giannis Spanos
- Mihalis Violaris
- Giorgos Zographos

== Contemporary éntekhno ==
Contemporary éntekhno is the form of éntekhno that emerged in the 1980s and is mostly what éntekhno means when used in context today. During this decade, bands such as Termites (formerly P.L.J. Band) featuring Lavrentis Machairitsas and Antonis Mitzelos, along with Nikos Portokaloglou's Fatme, formed the musical core that shifted Greek song from traditional acoustic or laiko motifs toward a purely electric and Western-style sound. Within this framework, Antonis Mitzelos is recognized for his contribution to shaping the Greek electric sound through his guitar approach, compositions, and arrangements, both with Termites and through his participation as a musician, arranger, and composer in numerous albums within the Greek discography. In the same context of sonic renewal, Nikos Papazoglou and the Katsimicha Brothers were subsequently added, introducing an experiential and folk-rock style. The following decade (1990s) saw the emergence of a new generation of songwriters and bands, such as Alkinoos Ioannidis, Miltiadis Paschalidis, Pyx Lax, and Sokratis Malamas, who continued in the same artistic mindset, consolidating the form of contemporary electric entechno. Characteristic examples of this early period include songs such as "Skoni" (1984) and "Poso se thelo" (1988) by Termites, "San Star tou Sinema" (1985) by Nikos Ziogalas, "Filaraki" by Sofia Vossou (1986), "Kaloferaki" by Fatme (1986), as well as the single "Me to idio mako" (1991) with music by Mitzelos and lyrics by Lina Nikolakopoulou for Eleftheria Arvanitaki.

Notable complete works of electric entechno song include:

* I Amartoli Maria ("Sinful Mary") –Termites, featuring George Dalaras (1984)

* Zesta Pota ("Warm Drinks") – Haris & Panos Katsimichas (1985)

* Vgainoume apo to tounel ("We are exiting the tunnel") – Fatme (1986)

* Meno ektos ("I remain outside") – Eleftheria Arvanitaki (1991)

* Tis Meras kai tis Nychtas ("Of Day and Night") – Sokratis Malamas (1992)

* O Ilios tou Cheimona Me Melancholei ("The Winter Sun Makes Me Melancholy") – Pyx Lax (1993)

* Pafsilypon ("Anodyne") – Lavrentis Machairitsas (1996)

* O Dromos, o Chronos kai o Ponos ("The Road, Time and Pain") – Alkinoos Ioannidis (1997)

* Kakes synitheies ("Bad habits") – Miltiadis Paschalidis (1998)

* Fylakas aggelos ("Guardian angel") – Adonis Mitzelos lyrics by Eleni Zioga, performed by Yiannis Kotsiras (1999)

=== Artists ===
- Eleftheria Arvanitaki
- Haris Alexiou
- Giannis Haroulis
- Alkinoos Ioannidis
- Katsimihas Brothers
- Yannis Kotsiras
- Stamatis Kraounakis
- Lavrentis Machairitsas
- Mitzelos Adonis
- Savina Yannatou
- Miltos Paschalidis
- Sokratis Malamas
- Thanassis Papakonstantinou
- Nikos Papazoglou
- Alkistis Protopsalti
- Tania Tsanaklidou
- Nikos Xydakis
- Natassa Bofiliou

== See also ==
- Greek folk music
- Laïkó
- Nana Mouskouri
