= Sounds (band) =

Greek 1960s pop band

- Origin: Athens, Greece
- Genre: Pop rock
- Years active: 1963–1973
- Labels: Music Box, Pan-Vox, Grecophon
- Past members: Takis Antoniadis (1963-67, 1970-73); George Legakis (1963-67); Andreas Danakalis; Takis Sfakianopoulos; Mimis Trikouraris (1063-67, 1970-73); Tammy (1966-1970); Sotiris Natras (1967-1970); Petros Milas; Spyros Metaxas; Panagiotis Karboulonis; Michalis Nikoloulis; Nikos Karagiannis; Dimitris Maroudas

The Sounds were a garage pop/rock band of the 1960s Greek Golden Youth era. They often sang Greek adaptations of foreign songs, although they also wrote and performed some original Greek songs. They were one of the more commercial groups of the era.

== Members ==
Early members were:

- Takis Antoniadis (Greek: Τάκης Αντωνιάδης, 1963-67, 1970-73) - vocals
- George Legakis (Greek: Γιώργος Λεγάκης, 1063-67) - guitar
- Andreas Danakalis (Greek: Αντρέας Δανάκαλης) - bass
- Takis Sfakianopoulos (Greek: Τάκης Σφακιανόπουλος) - organ
- Mimis Trikourakis (Greek: Μίμης Τρικουράκης, 1963-67, 1970-73) - drums
- Tammy (1966–1970) - vocals
- Sotiris Natras (Greek: Σωτήρης Νάτρας, 1967-1970) - saxophone

Later members included

- Petros Milas (Greek: Πέτρος Μήλας) - vocals
- Spyros Metaxas (Greek: Σπύρος Μεταξάς) - guitar
- Panagiotis Karboulonis (Greek: Παναγιώτης Καρμπουλώνης) - guitar
- Michalis Nikoloulis (Greek: Μιχάλης Νικολούλης) - guitar
- Nikos Karagiannis (Greek: Νίκος Καραγιάννης) - bass
- Dimitris Maroudas (Greek: Δημήτρης Μαρούδας) - drums

and others.

== Discography ==
Their hits included

- "To Mathima" (Greek: Το Μάθημα = The Lesson, adaptation of Un Bimbo Sul Leone, by Adriano Celentano)
- "Apopse Se Thelo" (Greek: Απόψε Σε Θέλω = I Want You Tonight, adaptation of Stasera Mi Butto, by Rocky Roberts)

== See also ==
- Rock music in Greece
- Golden Youth 1960s era in Greece
