= Giorgos Zographos =

Greek musician and actor

- Born: Georgios Zographos; 4 August 1936; Athens, Greece
- Died: 12 August 2005 (body discovered) Athens, Greece
- Genres: Greek New Wave, entechno
- Occupations: Musician, actor
- Instrument: Vocals

Giorgos Zographos (Greek: Γεώργιος (Γιώργος) Ζωγράφος, pronounced [ʝeˈorʝios ˈʝorɣos zoˈɣrafos]; born 4 August 1936; body discovered 12 August 2005) was a Greek musician and actor.

== Biography ==
Georgios Zographos was born in Athens in 1936, the son of actors Nikos Zographos and Alikē Zographou. He started his career as an actor after graduating from the Drama School of Karolos Koun. He first sang in the Mykonos boîte Thalamē (Θαλάμη) followed by appearances at many musical clubs (Συμπόσιο, Εσπερίδες, Απανεμιά, Τετράδιο, Δώμα, Χρυσό κλειδί) at Plaka.

Zographos was a representative of the Greek New Wave. Some of his most famous song performances are that Άκρη δεν έχει ο ουρανός (written by Notis Mavroudes), Πέρα από τη θάλασσα (by Giannis Markopoulos), Συλλογή ποιητών (by Nikos Mamangakis), Μαουτχάουσεν (by Mikis Theodorakis), Ο Ιρλανδός κι ο Ιουδαίος (by Manos Hatzidakis).

=== Death ===
In Friday, 12 August 2005, Zographos was found dead in his flat in Syntagma Square. He was found by one of his friends who had been worried about Zographos been missing for about 15 days. Zographos was buried on 17 August, and interred in Athens' Kaisarianē Cemetery. Zographos was survived by his daughter.

== Noted performances and discography ==
The following is a list of the noted discography and live performances of Zographos, including third party albums and collections:

- 1965 - Thessaloniki Song Festival
- 1965 - Tο νέο κύμα στο ελληνικό τραγούδι
- 1967 - Ανθολογία
- 1968 - Γιώργος Ζωγράφος 2
- 1968 - Μπολιβάρ
- 1969 - Το νέο κύμα τραγουδά Χατζιδάκι
- 1969 - Οι ώρες
- 1970 - Συλλογή 1
- 1972 - Ασμα ασμάτων
- 1974 - 14 τραγούδια
- 1975 - Γράμματα από την Γερμανία
- 1976 - Το ίδιο βιολί
- 1976 - Υμνος και θρήνος για την Κύπρο
- 1978 - Στην άδεια πόλη
- 1978 - Εμμετρος ρίζος
- 1979 - Η χαβούζα
- 1981 - Τα ωραιότερα τραγούδια του 2
- 1983 - Σε πρώτη εκτέλεση, 14 τραγούδια
- 1984 - Ο Γιώργος Ζωγράφος τραγουδά
- 1987 - Ζήτω το Ελληνικό τραγούδι
- 1990 - Κυκλάμινα του Μάη
- 1993 - Το άλλο νέο κύμα Νο 2
- 1993 - Μια φορά θυμάμαι
- 1994 - Επιτυχίες
- 1995 - Μικρό παιδί σαν ήμουνα
