= Keti Chomata =

Greek singer and actress

- Birth name: Aikaterine Chomata
- Born: 24 October 1946; Athens, Greece
- Origin: Naxos, Greece
- Died: 24 October 2010 (aged 64); Athens, Greece
- Genres: Greek New Wave, entechno, laiko
- Occupation(s): Musician, actress
- Instrument: Vocals
- Years active: 1963-2010

Aikaterine "Keti" Chomata (Greek: Αικατερίνη (Καίτη) Χωματά, pronounced [ekateˈrini ˈceti xomaˈta]; October 24, 1946 - October 24, 2010) was a Greek singer and actress.

== Biography ==
Chomata was born in Athens in 1946; her family's origin was from the island of Naxos. She lived in the Plaka district of Athens and studied classical dance. According to Chomata, she became a singer after being expelled from school at age 16. She was discovered by Alekos Patsiphas, who met her at the Giorgos Oikonomides' radio show which dealt with searching for people of talent. Papastephanou introduced her to composer Giannis Spanos. Chomata became one of the leading representatives of the Greek New Wave genre and one of the favourite performers of Spanos' compositions; she performed with great success in the Athens boîte scene.

Composers with whom she has worked include Manos Hatzidakis, Mikis Theodorakis, George Kontogiorgos and Stavros Xarchakos. In 1965 she participated in Thessaloniki Song Festival with the song The summer is gone (Greek: Έφυγε το καλοκαίρι) written by George Kontogiorgos. A famous hit song of Chomata is Mia agape gia to kalokairi (Greek: Μια αγάπη για το καλοκαίρι, "A love for the summer") released in her debut 7' EP in 1964. The song was later used for the Vasilis Mavromatis' 1969 film Skies sten ammo (Greek: Σκιές στην άμμο, "Shadows on the sand"); a film in which she had the leading role and the only one in she ever played.

== Personal life ==
Chomata was married twice having two daughters and four grandchildren. Her first husband, with whom she had her children, was actor and director Vasilis Mavromatis; her second husband was Giannis Lianos, one of her loyal admirers.

== Death ==
Chomata was suffering from cancer in 2010. She died on her 64th birthday, after a car accident.

== Discography ==
Chomata published 18 albums, having sung over 200 songs.

== See also ==
- Arleta
- Mariza Koch
- Rena Koumioti
