= Tzeni Vanou =

Tzeni Vanou Τζένη Βάνου
- Birth name: Eugenia Vrachnou (gr. Ευγενία Βραχνού)
- Born: February 10, 1939; Athens, Attica, Greece
- Origin: Athens, Attica, Greece
- Died: February 5, 2014 (aged 74); Piraeus, Attica, Greece
- Genres: Laïko; Éntekhno
- Occupation: Singer
- Instrument: singing
- Years active: 1945–1999
- Labels: Minos, Βεντέτα
- Awards: Thessaloniki Song Festival First Award

Tzeni Vanou (Greek: Τζένη Βάνου, born Eugenia Vrachnou; 10 February 1939 – 5 February 2014) was a Greek singer, born in Athens.

She had planned on studying physics, but she met her mentor, Greek composer Mimis Plessas, who persuaded her to become a singer. She began her career in 1959 performing with the ERT orchestra. In 1964, she won first prize in the Thessaloniki Song Festival.

At age 74, she died at a Piraeus hospital in 2014 from cancer. During her last few months, she had undergone surgery to remove a tumor in her larynx.
