= Arleta (given name) =

Arleta is a female given name. Notable people with this given name include:

- Arleta Richardson (1923–2004), American children's author
- Arleta Meloch (born 1979), Polish Paralympian runner
- Arleta Podolak (born 1993), Polish judoka at the 2016 Olympics
- Arleta Jeziorska (born 1970), Mexican actress

== See also ==
- Arleta (1945–2017), Greek musician
