= Rena Pagrati =

Greek actress (1949–1998)

- Born: 13 March 1949; Corfu, Greece
- Died: 25 June 1998 (aged 49); Athens, Greece

Rena Pagrati (Greek: Ρένα Παγκράτη; 13 March 1949 – 25 June 1998) was a Greek cinema, TV and theatre actress. On 25 June 1998 she committed suicide.

Rena Pagrati was also a singer in the Greek musical band "Nostradamos".
