= Poll (band) =

Greek musical group

- Origin: Athens, Greece
- Genres: Pop
- Years active: 1971–1973
- Labels: Polydor Records
- Members: Kostas Tournas; Robert Williams; Stavros Logaridis; Kostas Papaioannou; Nasia Sandi; Kris; Despoina Glezou

Poll was a Greek pop band founded in 1971 by Kostas Tournas, Robert Williams, Stavros Logaridis and Kostas Papaioannou. It is considered a historic Greek group of the 1970s with pioneering lyrics, that resonated with the Greek youth of the '70s. The band's songs are described as "some of the best songs, which have remained in the history of Greek music". Poll is the most commercially successful Greek band of all time.

== History ==
=== Background ===
Kostas Tournas and Robert Williams were childhood friends who started their musical cooperation in 1964 when they formed the group Teenagers. As a group, the two recorded their first song "You don’t love me".

In 1967, they changed the name of the group to "Dinos and the X-Rays" but they separated soon after since Tournas had to go to the army and Williams went to Rhodesia where he stayed for two years.

They eventually reunited and along with Stavros Logaridis, they formed another group which at first was not intended to be a professional group. Ultimately, they named their band "Poll", after first considering the names "Paul" (after Paul McCartney) and "Omega Limited". Poll, along with Nostradamos, was one of the first pop groups of Greece.

=== Poll ===
The motto of Poll was Poll is love and their logo was the stylised outline of a dove. Their first concert was at the Pedion tou Areos in Athens. Poll also started appearing at the popular Athens music club Kyttaro presenting folk rock songs influenced from the hippie culture which soon became very popular among the youth. They also appeared at Elatirio presenting music influenced by Crosby, Stills, Nash And Young and featuring two new members, vocalist Nasia Sandi, and drummer Kostas Papaionannou. At Elatirio, they were also joined by vocalist Despina Glezou who later left the group to pursue a "more personalised role".

The group started recitals at a home which was owned by the grandmother of Kostas Charalambides, who was a salesman for the Greek record company Elladisk, a subsidiary of Dutch multinational Philips. Charalambides provided a demo of the band to Christos Fasolas, who was working for Elladisk in the area of copyright law, and they eventually got a record contract.

In April 1971, they released their first single which became a huge hit. On one side was the song "Anthrope Agapa"(Άνθρωπε Αγάπα, Mankind Love Each Other) and on the B-side was "Ela Ilie Mou" (Έλα Ήλιε μου, Come My Sun). The record was under the Polydor record label. Following a suggestion by Fasolas, Stavros Logaridis took part in the recording of the song, after which he decided to join the group.

=== First album ===
In September 1971, their first album Anthrope... (Άνθρωπε..., Humankind...) was released, which (since the 1990s reissues) included the song "Anthrope Agapa", becoming a huge hit, selling 200,000 copies, a number unsurpassed before or since by any Greek group. The album was full of musical breakthroughs, and was packaged in a trendy gunny sack.

Anthrope Agapa, ti Fotia Stamata (Mankind Love Each Other, Stop the Gunfire), is considered the first anti-war protest song in the history of Greek rock and was released during the junta years in Greece. The song has been called "perhaps the most hippie hymn for the Greeks". The song was echoing the hippie slogan Make love not war and was inspired directly by the Vietnam War, becoming a "smash hit". With "Anthrope Agapa", Poll combined "political and countercultural elements" in their songs. Other hits from the same album included "Poll Means Love", "Ela Ilie Mou" (this was added to the tracklist since the 1990s reissues), "Stin Pigi Mia Kopela" (Στην Πηγή μια Κοπέλα, A Girl At the Fountain), and "I Genia Mas" (also added to the tracklist since the 1990s reissues).

In the spring of 1972 the band recorded a single featuring the songs "Aety" (Αετοι, Eagles) and "I Genia Mas" which became huge hits. Later in 1972, they appeared at the Thessaloniki Song Festival where they played "Molyvies Fotografies" (Μολυβιές φωτογραφίες, Sketches), which they also released as a single with "Oses Fores" on the flip-side.

=== Lefko and breakup ===
Anthrope... was followed by their second album, simply titled Poll, but nicknamed Lefko (Λευκό, White) due to its white cover, which was influenced by the Beatles' White Album. Lefko was the last album of the group and included songs like "Ελένη" (Eleni), "Πες της μαϊμούς να μη με πειράζει με το δάχτυλό της" (Les tis maimous na mi me pirazi me to dachtylo tis, "Tell The Monkey Not To Disturb Me With Its Finger"), ""Ξημερώνει" (Ximeroni, "It's Dawn") and others. The album package also included a comic book which illustrated the history of the band.

By December 1972, near the time that the group broke up, Williams had become the main composer of the band, replacing in that role Tournas who until then had composed most of the band's songs. Their last performance was in January 1973 when they appeared at Nikos Mastorakis's New Year's special at YENED TV "Na Ta Xanapoume?" (Should We Sing Them Again?). There, they performed their hit "Aety" ("Eagles").

Poll broke up soon after their second album, because Tournas wanted to pursue a solo career. When asked about the reasons for his decision, Tournas commented that "Perhaps, the decision for the break up is due to the need of a person to create work which cannot be covered by the group. Would he then have to "bury" his creative need for sentimental reasons?". Tournas has also described the breakup of the band as a "great loss" adding that while in the beginning the members of the band thought they would go on for a long time and it was not pleasant when they disbanded, he did not think that Poll could be kept going as a "business" by force.

=== Reunions ===
On 24 September 1982 the band reunited for a concert at Lycabettus which was recorded and released as an album. Following their 1982 reunion, their first two albums were also released again due to high popular demand which had caused the older album editions to become collector items. In September 1991 a repeat performance was given by the band, at the same location in Lycabettus, which led to rumours of a permanent reunion, although this did not pan out.

== Message and impact ==
Unlike similar pop groups of the era, Poll did not confine themselves solely to erotic and love themes in their songs. Their hit "Anthrope Agapa" was an anti-war song and many of their other songs touched on various sociopolitical issues of the young of the era, such as long hair, which was viewed with suspicion by the junta and the older generation at the time. Their songs about love were different and featured groundbreaking rhythms which alternated within a composition. Their performances throughout Greece were considered important events and were attended by large audiences. Their 1972 appearances at Elatirio club on Heyden Street in Athens were attended by full house audiences every night.
