= Mariza Koch =

Greek singer

Mariza Koch Μαρίζα Κωχ
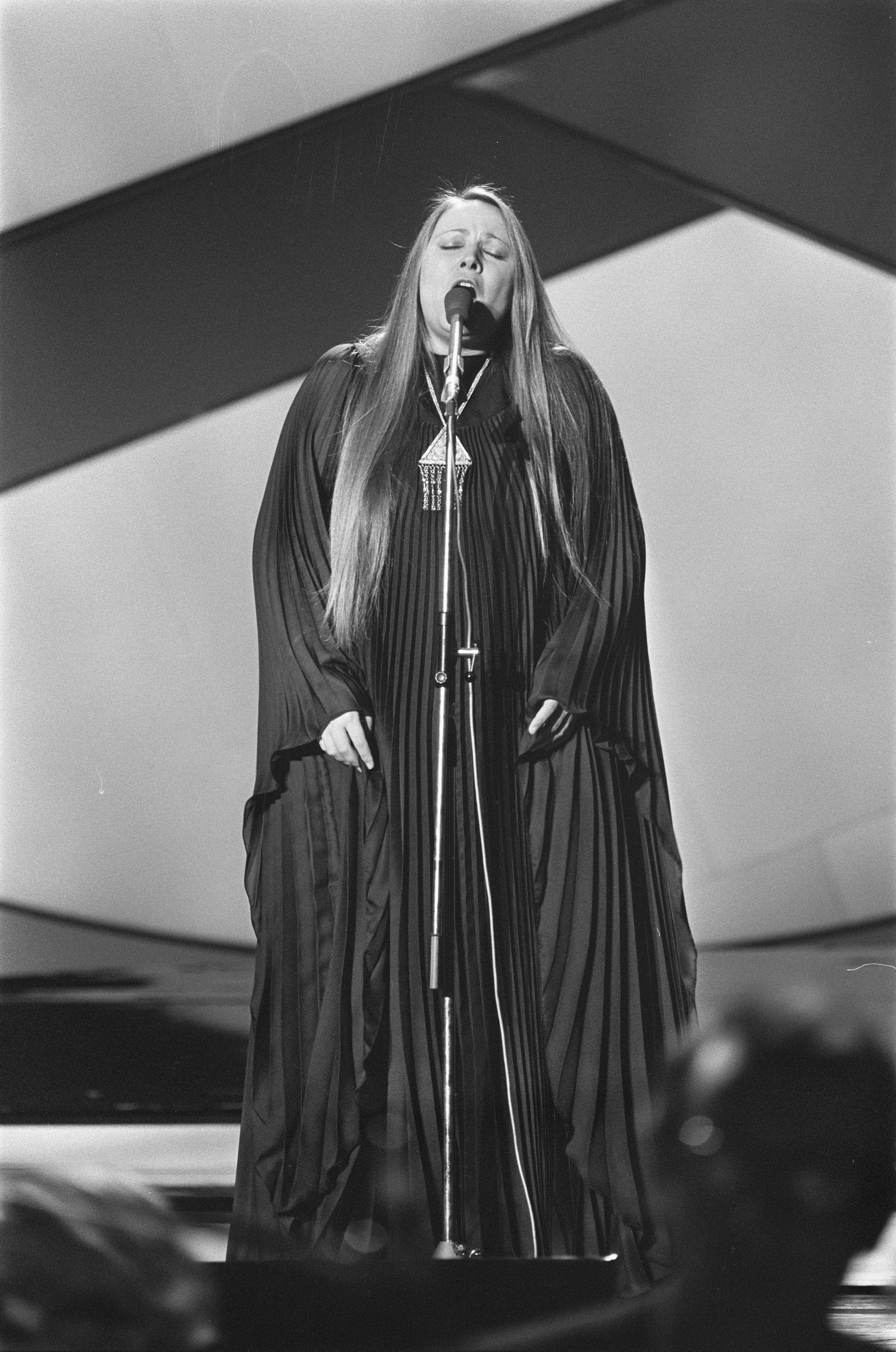
- Mariza Koch at the Eurovision Song Contest 1976

Background information
- Born: 14 March 1944 (age 82); Athens, Greece
- Genres: Néo kýma, folk music, folk rock, jazz fusion
- Occupation: Singer
- Years active: 1965–present
- Website: www.marizakoch.gr

Mariza Koch (Greek: Μαρίζα Κωχ; born 14 March 1944) is a Greek folk music singer who has recorded many albums since starting her career in 1971. On the wider stage she is best remembered for representing her homeland at the Eurovision Song Contest 1976 with the song "Panagia mou, panagia mou".

== Early life ==
Mariza Koch was born in Athens in 1944 but lived in her mother's hometown in Santorini from a young age. Her father was German.

== Career ==
Koch began her musical career in 1971 with an album titled Arabas. It consisted of a collection of traditional Greek folk songs blended with unusual beats from traditional and modern electronic instrumental sounds.

Her unique vocals became the center piece of the music which on more than one occasion needed no accompaniment. No matter what one called it, the album was a resounding success. More albums followed with the sound eventually mellowing back into the original folk sounds of the past, where traditional instruments are used in their entirety.

Koch's most recent album included elements of traditional Greek music and Jazz Fusion. On March 14, 2010, Alpha TV ranked Koch the 29th top-certified female artist in the nation's phonographic era (since 1960).

=== Eurovision 1976 ===
Mariza Koch represented Greece in the Eurovision Song Contest 1976 with the song "Panagia mou, Panagia mou". Greece's participation sparked controversy as it referred to the Turkish invasion of Cyprus. The previous year, Greece had withdrawn from the contest for the same reason.

The organizers informed Mariza Koch that they were not responsible for her safety, as there were threats that armed Turks would be present at the venue and shoot her on stage. She signed a waiver stating that she would sing at her own risk. Rumors circulated that she was wearing a bulletproof vest when she went on stage.

== Discography ==
- 1971 "Αραμπάς" Arabas (Cart), the first Golden Disc in the history of Greek music
- 1973 "Μια στο καρφί και μια στο πέταλο" Mia sto karfi ke mia sto petalo (One blow at the nail and one at the horseshoe)
- 1974 "Η Μαρίζα Κωχ και δυο ζυγιές παιχνίδια" I Mariza Koch ke dio zygies pechnidia (Mariza Koch and two pounds of toys)
- 1976 "Παναγιά μου Παναγιά μου" Panagia mou Panagia mou (My Holy Mother, my Holy Mother)
- 1976 "Άσε με να ταξιδέψω" Ase me na taksidepso (Let me travel)
- 1977 "Μαρίζα Κωχ" Mariza Koch
- 1978 "Μια εκδρομή με τη Μαρίζα" Mia ekdromi me tin Mariza (A trip with Mariza)
- 1978 "Ένα περιβόλι γεμάτο τραγούδια" Ena periboli gemato tragoudia (A garden full of songs)
- 1979 "Αιγαίο 1" Egeo 1 (Aegean 1)
- 1979 "Αιγαίο 2" Egeo 2 (Aegean 2)
- 1980 "Ο Καθρέφτης" O kathreptis (The Mirror)
- 1982 "Στο βάθος κήπος" Sto vathos kipos (Garden in the Back)
- 1986 "Τα παράλια" Ta paralia (The beach songs)
- 1988 "Εθνική Οδός" Ethniki Odos (National Road)
- 1990 "Οι δρόμοι του μικρού Αλέξανδρου" I dromi tou mikrou Alexandrou (The roads of little Alexander)
- 1992 "Διπλή Βάρδια" Dipli Vardia (Double guard duty)
- "Η γοργόνα ταξιδεύει τον μικρό Αλέξανδρο" I gorgona taxidevi ton mikro Alexandro
- "Μια εκδρομή με τις εννέα μούσες" Mia ekdromi me tis ennea mouses (A trip with the nine muses)
- "Σαν ουράνιο τόξο" San ouranio toxo (Like a Rainbow)
- "Να τα πούμε" Na ta pume (Let's say it)
- "Μια γιορτή με τη Μαρίζα" Mia giorti me tin Mariza (A celebration with Mariza)
- "Τα χρωματιστά τραγούδια" Ta chromatista tragoudia (The coloured songs)
- 2002 "Διπλή Βάρδια" Dipli Vardia (Double guard duty)
- 2003 "Φάτα μοργκάνα" (Fata morgana)
- 2004 "Ραντεβού στην Αθήνα" Randevou stin Athina (Rendezvous in Athens)
- 2004 "Πνοή του Αιγαίου" Pnoi tu Egeou (Breath of Aegean)
- "Σ΄ αυτή την πόλη" S'avti tin poli (In this city)
- "Το τροπάριο της Κασσιανής" To tropario tis Kassianis (The hymn of Cassiane)
- "Τα παράλια" Ta paralia (The beach songs)
- 2009 "Πάνω στη Θάλασσα εγώ τραγουδώ" Pano sti Thalassa ego tragoudo (Above the sea I'm singing)

== See also ==
- Arleta
- Keti Chomata
- Rena Koumioti

Preceded by Marinella with Krasi, thalassa kai t' agori mou	Greece in the Eurovision Song Contest; 1976	Succeeded by Paschalis, Marianna, Robert Williams & Bessy with Mathima solfege
