= Michalis Violaris =

Greek-Cypriot singer (born 1944)

- Born: Michalakis Violaris; 9 January 1944 (age 82); Agia Varvara, Nicosia, Cyprus
- Genres: Greek popular music, Cypriot popular music, Modern Laika
- Occupations: Singer, actor, composer
- Years active: 1960s–present

Michalis Violaris (Greek: Μιχάλης Βιολάρης; born 9 January 1944), is a singer and composer of modern Greek and Cypriot music.

He is also a pioneer responsible for popularising in Greece Cypriot songs sung in the Cypriot dialect. His song "Ta Ryalia" (also "Ta Rialia") sung in Cypriot Greek became a hit in the top-10 of Greece in 1973.

== Life and career ==
He grew up in Larnaca, Cyprus where he studied at the National Conservatory of Music in Larnaca, a branch of the National Conservatory of Music of Athens. In 1962 he moved to Greece where he enrolled at the school of Philosophy of Athens University and eventually obtained his degree.

He became part of the New Wave musical movement in Greece and his first musical cooperation was with Greek composer Yannis Spanos. His songs made Cypriot music widely popular in Greece in the 1960s and 1970s. He won third prize at the Thessaloniki Song Festival in 1972 and in 1974 he came in second at the same festival. Aside from his cooperation with Yannis Spanos his songs included works by Greek composers such as Giorgos Kontogiorgos, Mimis Plessas, Yorgos Katsaros, Apostolos Kaldaras, Yorgos Mitsakis and others.

In 1971 he signed with Zodiac Records, while in 1977 his records were sold under the Lyra record label. His songs include works by Greek poets Georgios Vizyinos, Odysseas Elytis, Myrtiotissa and others.

His hits include "To Delfinokoritso", "Halalin tou", "Ta Karavakia", "Ta matia sou Katerinio", "Mia xanthia ap' ti Mytilini", "Irthes epses", "Aspra Karavia", "Ti Lozani ti Kozani", "An voulitho na s' arnitho", "Mavromalloussa Kopellia", and others.

He is considered one of the most popular people born in Cyprus.
