= Pavlos Sidiropoulos =

Greek rock musician (1948-1990)

Pavlos Sidiropoulos Παύλος Σιδηρόπουλος
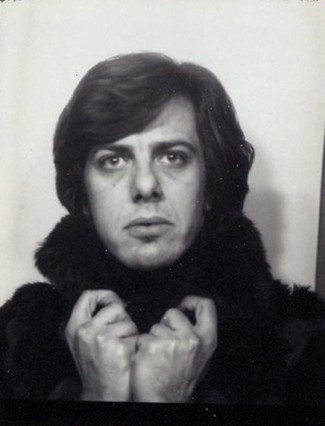

Background information
- Born: 27 July 1948; Athens, Greece
- Died: 6 December 1990 (aged 42) Neos Kosmos, Athens, Greece
- Genres: Rock
- Occupations: Singer, guitarist, songwriter
- Instruments: Vocals, guitar
- Years active: 1970–1990
- Website: pavlos-sidiropoulos.gr

Pavlos Sidiropoulos (Greek: Παύλος Σιδηρόπουλος; 27 July 1948 – 6 December 1990) was a Greek musician noted for combining rock music with Greek music. He is considered one of the pillars of Greek rock due to his involvement so early in its foundation. In particular, Flou (1976), an album produced with his band Spyridoula, had a major impact on the rock scene in Greece.

== Early life ==
Pavlos Sidiropoulos was born on 27 July 1948 in Athens, Greece to Konstantinos and Ioanna "Jenny" Sidiropoulos. His father was born in Sokhumi, GSSR, USSR (present-day Georgia) into a wealthy Pontic family that cultivated and sold tobacco. He later established ELFOT, which at the time was the only company selling photography paper in Greece. Pavlos' mother Jenny was from Heraklion, Crete. Through her, he was the great-grandson of George Zorbas, the inspiration for the 1946 novel Zorba the Greek and nephew of Elli Alexiou. His maternal aunt Galatea was an author and was married to Nikos Kazantzakis, author of Zorba the Greek, and later to poet Markos Avgeris.

Sidiropoulos lived with his family in the Kypseli and Patisia neighborhoods and in the suburb Galatsi of Athens. He had a younger sister, Melina. He completed three years of mathematics studies at Aristotle University in Thessaloniki starting in 1967 but left to pursue music and because he felt his education was stymied by the strict censorship introduced by the Greek junta. While at university, he lived with songwriter Vangelis Germanos and played percussion in a band.

== Career ==
Sidiropoulos' music career began in 1970 in Thessaloniki when he and Pantelis Delleyannidis formed Damon and Phintias, which took its name from the Greek legend exemplifying friendship. They merged with the band Bourboulia in 1972 and it was here that Sidiropoulos began experimenting by combining rock and Greek music. Bourboulia disbanded in 1974 due to issues with censorship; Delleyannidis left for England afterwards, thus dissolving Damon and Phintias as well. Sidiropoulos worked at his dad's paper factory for a few years and variously studied solfeggio, counterpoint, and harmony. He also collaborated with Yannis Markopoulos on one of the three albums they worked on together throughout Sidiropoulos' career: Thessalikos Kyklos (Thessalian Circle), 1974; Oropedio (Plateau), 1976; and Tolmiri Epikinonia (Daring Communication), 1987.

In 1976, he formed Spyridoula with brothers Vassilis and Niko Spyropoulos. Though the band had dissolved by the end of the 1970s, they released the album Flou (1978), still considered a foundational work within Greek rock. In 1979, he and other Greek rock musicians established the Artist's Company but never released an album. One of the songs produced during this time, Clown, Sidiropoulos' first song in English, later appeared on his 1985 album Zorba the Freak. In 1982, he again ran into trouble with censorship, this time with his album En Lefko, in which three of his songs ("I", "Adergraoud Me Stras", and "Istati Stigmi") were heavily censored due to references to drug use and other behaviors Minos EMI deemed anti-social. In 1980, he helped establish Oi Aprosarmostoi, who he continued to play with until his death in 1990.

=== Posthumous releases ===
In 1991, Oi Aprosarmostoi released Ante ke kali tichi maghes, an album with the same name as one of Sidiropoulos' earlier songs. It featured unreleased recordings of Sidiropoulos as well as tracks by other artists. The title could be interpreted as "so long, folks." The following year, Ta blues tou prigipa (The Blues of the Prince) was released, containing Sidiropoulos' experimental combinations of blues and rebetiko recorded between 1979 and 1981. En Archí in o Lógos (1994) had recordings from 1978 to 1989, spoken word, and fragments of an interview with ET2. The EP Day After Day (2001) was released by Minos EMI in collaboration with composer Michael Karras, who stumbled upon recordings of Sidiropoulos, Bourboulia, and bouzouki player Thanassis Polykandriotis from 1973.

=== Acting ===
Sidiropoulos had a brief acting career, with appearances including writer and director Andreas Thomopoulos' films Aldevaran (1975) and O Asymvivastos (1979); director Eugenia Fakinou's play In Kurdistan (1977) at Theatro Kava in Athens; and in the TV show Oikogeneia Zardi (The Zardis Family; 1983). Aldevaran was screened only at the Thessaloniki International Film Festival. He performed the songs in O Asymvivastos.

== Personal life and death ==
In 1990, Sidiropoulos began experiencing paralysis in his arm, which doctors diagnosed as left plexus arm paralysis. He took a break from live performances after the diagnosis and the death of his mother. That summer, he went to rehab in Naxos for his prolonged heroin use, a topic he touched on many times in his music. On 6 December, he fell into a heroin-induced coma at a friend's house in Neos Kosmos and died in transit to the hospital after suffering a heart attack caused by the overdose. He is buried in the Kokkinos Milos Cemetery in Nea Filadelfeia.

Sidiropoulos collaborated and was romantically involved with poet Giola Anagnostopoulou between 1977 and 1980. As she was also a known heroin user, she was accused by tabloids after his death of introducing the drug to Sidiropoulos. His friends denied the claims, saying that he did heroin prior to meeting Anagnostopoulou.

Sidiropoulos was openly leftist and habitually voted for the Communist Party of Greece (KKE). Many of his songs criticize Greek politics.

== Discography ==
Year	Band	Album name	Notable songs	Label	Ref.
1971	Damon and Phintias	To Xespasma/O Kosmos Tous		Zodiac Records	
1971	Damon and Phintias	O Gero-Mathios		Zodiac Records	
1972	Mpourmpoulia	Apogoitefsi/O Ntamis o Skliros		Zodiac Records	
1978	Spiridoula	Flou	"O Babis o Flou", "I Ora tou Stuff", "To '69 me Kapoion Filo", "Stin K"	Minos EMI	
1982	Oi Aprosarmostoi	En Lefko	"To Vivlio ton Iroon", "Horis Etia"	Minos EMI	
1985	Oi Aprosarmostoi	Zorba the Freak	"Clown", "Apogoitefsi"	Minos EMI	
1989	Oi Aprosarmostoi	Horis Makigiaz (Live at the Metro)	"Apokalypsi"	MLK	
1991	Oi Aprosarmostoi	Ante... ke Kali Tichi Maghes	"Ante... ke Kali Tichi Maghes"	Minos EMI	
1992	Solo	Ta Blues tou Prighipa		MLK	
1994	Solo	En Archí in o Lógos		7th Dimension	
2001	Solo	Day After Day	"Day After Day"	Minos EMI	
