= Forminx =

Greek 1960s pop band

- Origin: Athens, Greece
- Genres: Beat music, pop rock
- Years active: 1962–1966
- Labels: Pan-Vox, Music Box, Decca Records
- Past members: Tassos Papastamatis; Vasilis Bakopoulos; Sotiris Arnis; Vangelis Papathanassiou; Kostas Skokos; Themos Petrou (-1964); Titos Kalliris; Eugnomonas

The Forminx were one of the earliest garage pop/rock bands of the 1960s Greek Golden Youth era. Their name derives from the phorminx, an ancient Greek string instrument. They had a beat pop sound and they wrote and performed original songs in English. They initiated the "Yanka" dance craze in Greece.

== History ==
The origins of the Forminx trace back to a meeting between high school student Vangelis Papathanassiou and university student Vassilis Bakopoulos in 1959. A year later, they formed the band, along with Tassos Papastamatis, Sotiris Arnis, and Kostas Skokos. The band's name was initially the “Formix,” but it was later changed to the “Forminx”, under which they would become known.

The Forminx initially performed foreign popular dance hits at dance parties, receptions, and small clubs. However, they soon started to perform their own songs, many of them composed by Vangelis, with lyrics often written by the group's manager Nico Mastorakis, who would later become a very influential radio and TV producer. The group's "modern" Western sound and their English-language songs set them apart from the Greek traditional and folk music that was the mainstream at the time and quickly gained them a strong teenage following. They gave their first concert in front of an audience of thousands in Thessaloniki in 1964; other big concerts soon followed in both Thessaloniki and Athens. The group even appeared in a Greek film in 1962. In 1965, their biggest hit "Jeronimo Janka" started a Yanka-dance craze in Greece. They released a total of nine 7" vinyl singles. In 1966, at the peak of their career, the band disbanded, as its members wanted to take separate paths. Even though the Forminx were essentially an amateur garage band, they are considered the pioneers who introduced pop/rock music to the Greek young audiences of the 1960s.

== Members ==
Original members were:

- Tassos Papastamatis (Greek: Τάσος Παπασταμάτης) - vocals
- Vasilis Bakopoulos (Greek: Βασίλης Μπακόπουλος) - guitar
- Sotiris Arnis (Greek: Σωτήρης Αρνής) - bass, vibraphone
- Vangelis Papathanassiou (Greek: Βαγγέλης Παπαθανασίου) - organ
- Kostas Skokos (Greek: Κώστας Σκόκκος) - drums

Other members:

- Themos Petrou (Greek: Θέμος Πέτρου, left in 1964) - guitar, vocals
- Titos Kalliris (Greek: Τίτος Καλλίρης) - guitar
- Eugnomonas (Greek: Ευγνώμονας, full name Eugnomonas Dialetis) - percussion

Their manager was Nico Mastorakis, who also wrote the lyrics of some of their songs.

== Discography ==
Their hits included

- "Jeronimo Yanka"
- "Mandjourana's Shake"

== See also ==
- Rock music in Greece
- Golden Youth 1960s era in Greece
