= Agia Varvara, Nicosia =

Agia Varvara: Αγία Βαρβάρα (Greek); Ayvarvara (Turkish)
- Location in Cyprus
- Coordinates: 34°59′45″N 33°22′5″E
- Country: Cyprus
- District: Nicosia District

Population (2011)
  - Total: 2.204
- Time zone: UTC+2 (EET)
  - Summer (DST): UTC+3 (EEST)
- Website: http://ayiavarvara.org.cy/

Agia Varvara (Greek: Αγία Βαρβάρα; Turkish: Ayvarvara) is a village located in the Nicosia District of Cyprus.The village is named after Saint Barbara. The village is located 22 km south from Nicosia and is at an altitude of 311 meters. The village is known for its many cultivated and barren pieces of land. The village hosts the Church of Agia Varvara, the Chapel of Agia Paraskevi, Chapel of Agios Nektarios and the Chapel of Holy Cross.

== Economy ==
Residents of the village work primarily in agriculture and cultivate crops such as wheat, barley, and olives. Many residents commute to Nicosia to work as government employees, craftsmen and factory workers.

The main product of cultivation is barley. The cultivation of barley is one of the main occupations.

The systematic cultivation of yeast was recently initiated since viticulture used to be their primary occupation. However, that was unprofitable and vineyards were replaced with barley or olive trees. Many plots of land were rented to professional farmers for the cultivation of barley.

The cultivation of olive trees is limited in the village, as it mostly serves domestic needs. Many of the inhabitants produce oil for their own use.

Phytorio (nursery garden) is a small mountain, where pine trees, cypresses and brigalows were planted. This area belongs to the Forest Department. The community council plans to construct a community park next to it. This park will include a playground, a playing field and a kiosk.

In Spring, almond trees blossom across the village.

== History ==
Near Agia Varvara, the archeological site Alymras was discovered in 1982. The site was used for copper production, which dates to 600 BCE.

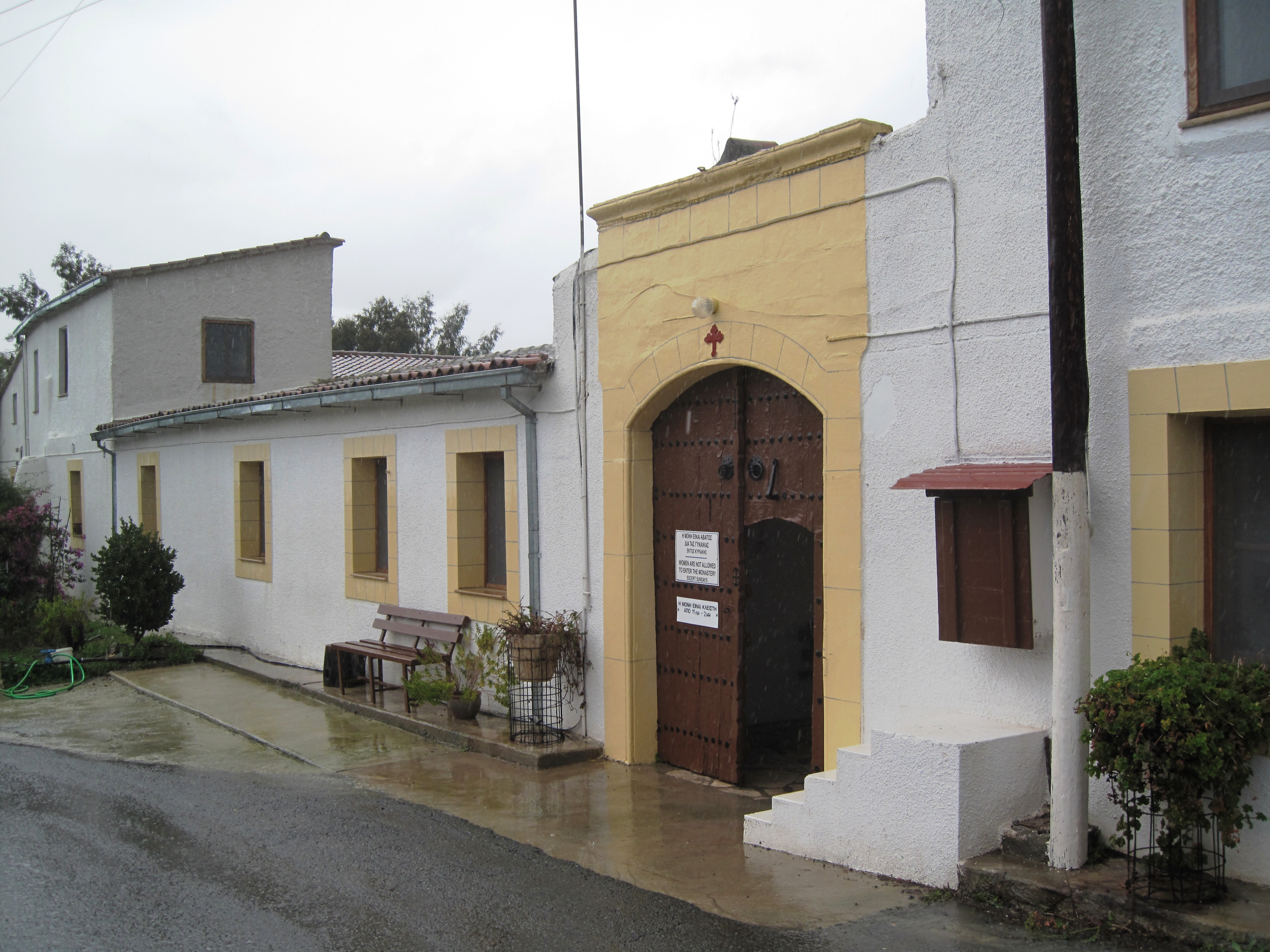
Ayia Varvara Orthodox Christian Monastery

Historic caverns are found in the region, and it is believed that the larger catacombs were made by the first Christians.

At the time of the Kingdom of Cyprus (1192 - 1489AD), Ayia Varvara was a fief. In the same location there was a village known as Agios Georgios "St George". The village was renamed to Ayia Varfara, however, after a fire destruction of its church (circa 1400AD), leaving St. Barbara's icon intact. To commemorate this, the place was renamed to Ayia Varvara.

During Turkish rule 15-20 Turkish families settled in the village along with residents of Nisou.

== Notable people ==
- Mihalis Violaris
