= Giannis Spanos =

Greek composer (1934–2019)

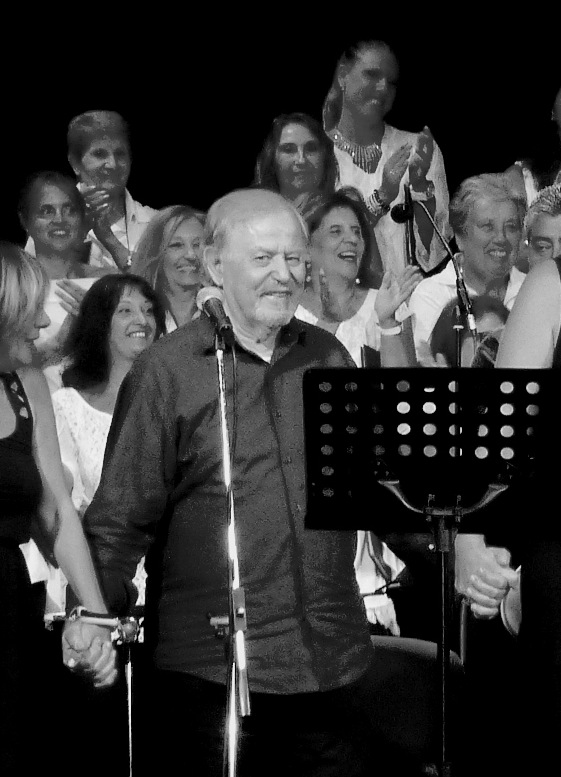
- Spanos in concert in Ermoupolis, Syros, August 2017

Background information
- Born: Ioannes Spanos; 26 July 1934; Kiato, Greece
- Died: 30 October 2019 (aged 85) Kiato, Greece
- Genres: Greek New Wave, entekhno, laiko
- Occupations: Composer, songwriter, lyricist, pianist
- Instrument: Piano
- Years active: 1961–2019

Ioannes "Giannis" Spanos (Greek: Ιωάννης "Γιάννης" Σπανός, pronounced [i.oˈaniz ˈʝanis spaˈnos]; 26 July 1934 – 30 October 2019), also transliterated as Yannis Spanos, was a Greek music composer and lyricist. In his early days as a musician he was also a piano accompanist. Spanos won the music prize at the 1971 Thessaloniki Film Festival for composing the score of the film Ekeino to kalokairi.

== Biography ==
Spanos was born in Kiato in 1934. His father was a dentist. Spanos was influenced by his sister's piano studies, and moved to Athens at the age of 17 to study at the National Odeum where he learned to play the piano. His father wanted him to become a scientist so he sponsored a yearly trip around Europe; Spanos lived briefly in Italy, Germany and the UK, eventually coming to Paris, France, whereto he eventually moved more permanently in 1961.

In Paris he worked in the artistic scene at the Rive Gauche as a piano accompanist. He accompanied there many French artists like Cora Vaucaire, Serge Gainsbourg, Béatrice Arnac and Juliette Gréco. It was in Paris and in French that he wrote his first songs; an example is the song Sidonie that was sung by Brigitte Bardot in the film A Very Private Affair.

When he eventually moved back to Greece, he was pivotal in the creation of the Greek New Wave genre. He continued composing music, including soundtracks for films; his songs have been sung by many Greek singers including Keti Chomata, Arleta, Giannis Poulopoulos and Dimitris Mitropanos.

=== Death ===
He died due to a stroke at his home in Kiato on October 30, 2019, at the age of 85, where he was buried.

== See also ==
- Horse Stories
- Manos Hatzidakis
- Mikis Theodorakis
- Dionysis Savvopoulos
- Mimis Plessas
- Stavros Xarchakos
- Manos Loizos
- Lefteris Papadopoulos
- Lina Nikolakopoulou
