= Idols (band) =

Greek 1960s pop band

- Origin: Athens, Greece
- Genre: Pop rock
- Years active: 1964–1972, 1989-1991
- Labels: Parlophone, Music Box, Pan-Vox
- Past members: Jo Michat; Antonis Gioulis; Demis Roussos; Ntinos Papavasiliou; Notis Lalaitis; Nikos Tsilogiannis; Lazaros Papageorgiou; George Petridis; Manolis Kavouklis; Vasilis Konstantinidis; Tzimis Tzimopoulos

The Idols were a garage pop/rock band of the 1960s Greek Golden Youth era. They often sang Greek adaptations of foreign songs, although they later recorded original songs in English. They were one of opening acts at the Rolling Stones concert in Athens in April 1967.

== Members ==
Early members were:

- Jo Michat (Greek: Τζο Μισά) - vocals
- Antonis Gioulis (Greek: Αντώνης Γιούλης) - guitar
- Demis Roussos (Greek: Ντέμης Ρούσος) - bass
- Ntinos Papavasiliou (Greek: Ντίνος Παπαβασιλείου) - piano
- Notis Lalaitis (Greek: Νότης Λαλαΐτης) - keyboards
- Nikos Tsilogiannis (Greek: Νίκος Τσιλογιάννης) - drums

Later members included:

- Lazaros Papageorgiou (Greek: Λάζαρος Παπαγεωργίου) - vocals
- George Petridis (Greek: Γιώργος Πετρίδης) - vocals
- Manolis Kavouklis (Greek: Μανώλης Καβουκλής) - bass
- Vasilis Konstantinidis (Greek: Βασίλης Κωνσταντινίδης) - drums
- Tzimis Tzimopoulos (Greek: Τζίμης Τζιμόπουλος) - drums

and others.

== Discography ==
Their hits included:

- "Trikymia Stin Kardia Mou" (Greek: Τρικυμία στην Καρδιά Μου, lit. 'Tempest In My Heart', adaptation of La Tempesta, by Angelo Branduardi)
- "Ena Koritsi Mou Eihe Pei" (Greek: Ενα Κοριτσι Μου'χε Πει, adaptation of Lei mi diceva, by the New Trolls)
- "Xafnika M’ Agapas" (Greek: Ξαφνικα Μ' Αγαπάς, lit. 'Suddenly You Love Me', adaptation of Suddenly You Love Me, by The Tremeloe)
- "Sou’dosa Tin Agapi Moy" (Greek: Σου ‘δωσα την Aγάπη Mου, lit. 'I Gave You My Love')

== See also ==
- Rock music in Greece
- Golden Youth 1960s era in Greece
