= Olympians (band) =

Greek 1960s pop band

- Origin: Thessaloniki, Greece
- Genre: Pop rock
- Years active: 1965–1971
- Label: Helladisc/Philips Records
- Past members: Paschalis Arvanitidis; Koulis Kalogiannidis; Alkis Kakaliagos; Vangelis Koutsotolis; Dimitris Lazaridis; Nikos Papazoglou; Vasilis Papavasiliou; Panos Lemonidis

The Olympians were a garage pop/rock band of the 1960s Greek Golden Youth era. Their national success started at a 1966 concert/competition, when the audience put them in first place ahead of all the popular groups of the era (Idols, Charms, Sounds, Jaguars, Stormies). They were the first group to consistently sing in Greek, both adaptations of foreign songs and original ones.

== Members ==
Original members were:

- Paschalis Arvanitidis (Greek: Πασχάλης Αρβανιτίδης) - vocals, bass
- Koulis Kalogiannidis (Greek: Κούλης Καλογιαννίδης)- guitar
- Alkis Kakaliagos (Greek: Άλκης Κακαλιάγκος) - piano, Hammond organ
- Vangelis Koutsotolis (Greek: Βαγγέλης Κουτσοτόλης) - saxophone
- Dimitris Lazaridis (Greek: Δημήτρης Λαζαρίδης) - drums

Later members were:

- Nikos Papazoglou (Greek: Νίκος Παπάζογλου) - guitar, vocals
- Vasilis Papavasiliou (Greek: Βασίλης Παπαβασιλείου) - guitar, vocals
- Panos Lemonidis (Greek: Πάνος Λεμονίδης) - drums

== Discography ==
Their hits included:

- O Tropos (Greek: Ο Τρόπος = The Way)
- Signomi (Greek: Συγνώμη = I’m Sorry)
- To Scholeio (Greek: Το Σχολείο = The School, adaptation of American folk song Lonesome Traveler)
- O Alexis (Greek: Ο Αλέξης = Alex)
- To Koritsi Tou Mai (Greek: Το Κορίτσι του Μάη = May Girl, adaptation of Venus, by Shocking Blue)

== See also ==
- Rock music in Greece
- Golden Youth 1960s era in Greece
