= Charms (band) =

Greek 1960s pop band

- Origin: Athens, Greece
- Genre: Pop rock
- Years active: 1964–1973
- Labels: Music Box, Pan-Vox, Polydor Records
- Past members: Kostas Karydas (-1965); George Balaskas (-1964); Alekos Glykas (-1964); Kostas Nikolopoulos; Spyros Karakoutas (-1965); George Stratis; Mike Rozakis; Petros Pollatos; Teris Ieremias

The Charms were a garage pop/rock band of the 1960s Greek Golden Youth era. Initially they wrote and performed songs in English, but later switched to Greek songs with a more pop sound. They were the first group of that era to issue an LP. They were also featured in a number of Greek films of the time.

== Members ==
Early members were:

- Kostas Karydas (Greek: Κώστας Καρύδας, left 1965) - vocals
- George Balaskas (Greek: Γιώργος Μπαλάσκας, left 1964) -guitar
- Alekos Glykas (Greek: Αλέκος Γλύκας, left 1964) - guitar
- Kostas Nikolopoulos (Greek: Κώστας Νικολόπουλος) - guitar
- Spyros Karakoutas (Greek: Σπύρος Καρακούτας, left 1965) - bass
- George Stratis (Greek: Γιώργος Στρατής) - drums
- Michael "Mike" Rozakis (Greek: Μάϊκ Ροζάκης, joined 1965) - bass, vocals
- Petros Pollatos (Greek: Πέτρος Πολλάτος, joined 1965) - saxophone
- Teris Ieremias (Greek: Τέρης Ιερεμίας, joined 1965) - organ, vocals

Later members included

- Theodoros Laskaris (Greek: Θεόδωρος Λάσκαρης) - keyboards
- Vassilis Tzavaras (Greek: Βασίλης Τζαβάρας) - drums
- George Melekis (Greek: Γιώργος Μελέκης) - bass

and others.

== Discography ==
Their hits included

- "To Trelokoritso" (Greek: To Τρελοκόριτσο = The Crazy Girl)
- "Glykeia Agapimeni" (Greek: Γλυκειά Αγαπημένη = Sweet Lover)
- "Exo Apo Ton Kosmo" (Greek: ‘Εξω απ' τον Κόσμο = Out of this World).

== See also ==
- Rock music in Greece
- Golden Youth 1960s era in Greece
