= Robert Williams (singer) =

Greek singer and composer (1947–2022)

- Ρόμπερτ Ουίλιαμς
- Born: Ροβέρτος-Κωνσταντίνος Ουίλιαμς; 4 December 1949; Athens, Greece
- Died: 21 August 2022 (aged 72); Athens, Greece
- Occupations: Singer; composer

Robertos Konstantinos Williams (Greek: Ροβέρτος-Κωνσταντίνος Ουίλιαμς, 4 December 1949 – 21 August 2022), best known as Robert Williams (Greek: Ρόμπερτ Ουίλιαμς), was a Greek singer and composer. He represented Greece in the Eurovision Song Contest 1977, together with singers Pascalis, Marianna Toli and Bessy Argyraki.

== Life and career ==
Born in Athens to a British father and a Greek mother, Williams began his career as guitarist the and singer of the rock band Poll. He started his solo career in 1974, and in 1976 he had his major hit with the song "Μίλα μου" ("Talk to Me"). In 1977, together with singers Pascalis, Marianna Toli and Bessy Argyraki he entered the Eurovision Song Contest, placing fifth with the song "Mathema Solfege".

Close to New Democracy, he composed the anthem of the party in 1982. He was also active as a score composer.

Williams died of pancreatic cancer on 21 August 2022, at the age of 72.
