= Nostradamos (band) =

Greek pop group

Nostradamos Νοστράδαμος
- Origin: Athens, Greece
- Genres: Pop, Rock
- Years active: 1971–1975
- Labels: Κίνησις, Fabelsound, Lyra Zodiac
- Members: Stelios Fotiadis; Ippokratis Exarchopoulos (Charlie); Chris King; Despoina Glezou

Nostradamos (Greek: Νοστράδαμος) was a Greek pop group founded in 1971 by Stelios Fotiadis, Ippokratis Exarchopoulos–also known as Charlie (Greek: Τσάρλι)–and English female vocalist Chris King. It was one of the most popular pop groups in Greece which dominated the Greek pop-rock scene in the early to mid-seventies. Despoina Glezou joined the group in time to perform at the 1972 Thessaloniki Song Festival where they won the best new composer and performer prize with the song "Dos Mou to Heri Sou" (Give Me Your Hand) which became a huge success in Greece during the junta years. Glezou was also a member of the other pioneering Greek pop group Poll. Nostradamos has been ranked as number 9 in a list of the top 10 most influential rock groups during the dictatorship in Greece. In 1974, during the dictatorship, the group won the first Greek Eurovision participation contest run by the state broadcaster ERT to represent Greece at Eurovision but was not allowed to participate due to a scandal.

== History ==
=== Rise to stardom ===
Nostradamos was founded in 1971 by Stelios Fotiadis, Ippokratis Exarchopoulos, and Chris King. It was one of the most popular pop groups in Greece which dominated the Greek pop-rock scene in the early to mid-seventies. The group took its name from French astrologer Nostradamus. Despoina Glezou joined the group in time to perform at the 1972 Music Festival of Thessaloniki where they won the best new group and best new composer and performer prize with the song "Dos Mou to Heri Sou" (Give Me Your Hand) which became a huge success in Greece. Glezou was also a member of the other pioneering Greek pop group Poll. Their success was meteoric and their single "Dos Mou to Heri Sou" sold 9,000 copies in one month. In 1973, the group reached the height of their popularity and went on a Panhellenic tour which was met with great success.

=== Scandal and sudden fall ===
During their successful 1973 tour, the group were touring Northern Greece when police and junta security forces went to a Thessaloniki hotel where the band stayed, and arrested Ippokratis Exarchopoulos and the sound engineer of the band on charges of raping a 16-year-old girl, stemming from a deposition made by the girl's family to the police. Exarchopoulos denied the charges saying that the girl was a fan who had followed the group from Kavala without his knowledge. The girl was found in the hotel and was returned to her family in Kavala. Following the arrests, the girl's father offered to drop the charges for a large sum of money.

The group did not have the funds to pay for the damages the family of the girl had demanded, and they resorted to asking for money from friends and acquaintances. The money was finally collected and the girl's family dropped the charges. Subsequently, Charlie was released from jail. Following the incident, the junta forbade any broadcast of the group's music while at the same time a directive was issued to all Greek schools that prohibited students from attending concerts by the group.

The affair greatly damaged the group, and even more so Charlie, who never psychologically recovered from the incident. In 1974, during the dictatorship, the group won the first Eurovision participation contest run by the state broadcaster ERT to represent Greece at Eurovision. However, close to the competition date, the band was prevented from competing at Eurovision, due to the scandal; Greek laiko singer Marinella was sent instead. In 1974, Charlie and Chris King left the group and two new members, Rena Pagrati and Michalis Lambropoulos, joined the band. A year later, in 1975, the group broke up.

== Aftermath ==
After the breakup of Nostradamos, Charlie worked at various entertainment venues to try to earn money to pay back the loans he received to pay the girl's family. While he tried to launch a solo career, he never attained the same success that he had as a member of the group. His only notable solo accomplishment was his song "Ο Θάνατος του Kλόουν" (Death of the Clown), which he sang at the Music Festival of Thessaloniki with success.

After "Death of the Clown", Charlie started using drugs. He was arrested in the 1990s for possession and trafficking of heroin, and was sent to prison. In his car, according to the police, guns and hand grenades were found, and he was in possession of about 10 kg (22 lb) of heroin, Kalashnikov rifles, and Magnum pistols. Since the heroin was found in Charlie's apartment, which he shared with his wife, the couple was arrested by the Greek police. It was one of the biggest heroin busts of the decade.

In his second year of incarceration, days before his trial date, Charlie overdosed and died at the Tzaneio Hospital for inmates of Korydallos Prison on 21 March 2000, six days shy of his 47th birthday. Group member Rena Pangrati had died on 25 June 1998 from a pill overdose. In a 2016 interview with Lifo magazine, Despoina Glezou stated that she was "hard with the fans" of the group, and "she was trying to protect the other three [members]" from the fans. She also stated that this made it easier for her to eventually leave the group. Nostradamos has been ranked as number 9 in a list of the top 10 most influential rock groups during the dictatorship in Greece.

== Discography ==
This is the complete discography of Nostradamos from the compilation "Νοστράδαμος – Νοσταλγοί Του Rock 'N' Roll - 20 Μεγάλες Επιτυχίες" (Nostradamos – Nostalgic for Rock 'N' Roll – 20 Big Hits) released in 2007 by Δίφωνο on CD. The songs were also released as vinyl singles and albums in the 1970s.

Track number	Song title	Length
1	Ατλαντίς (Μαγική Πολιτεία) (Atlantis (Magical Realm))	3:42
2	Τι Συμβαίνει (What's Going On)	2:26
3	Του Χωριού Το Πανηγύρι (The Village Festival)	3:19
4	Παιδική Σκηνή (Children's Stage)	2:48
5	Η Ζωή Μου (My Life)	3:12
6	Δώσ' Μου Το Χέρι Σου (Give Me Your Hand)	2:50
7	Ήταν Δώδεκα Παιδιά (There Were Twelve Lads)	2:03
8	Μη Μιλάς Γι' Αυτούς (Don't Talk About Them)	3:03
9	Η Αθάνατη Πηγή (The Immortal Spring)	3:24
10	Something Lost	3:21
11	Τα Παραμύθια Της Γιαγιάς (Grandma's Tales)	3:09
12	Θέλω Να Σας Τραγουδήσω (I Want to Sing to You)	3:49
13	Φίλε Δεν Θα 'ρθει (Friend, It Won't Come)	2:58
14	Το Παιδί (The Lad)	3:32
15	Το Όνειρο (The Dream)	2:30
16	Έλα Κοντά Μου (Come Close to Me)	2:13
17	Χλωμό Φεγγάρι (Pale Moon)	4:25
18	Και Πρέπει (And They Must)	3:00
19	Ο Κοσμος Βουβος (The World Speechless)	2:37
20	Δεκα Μερες Πριν Πεθανω (Ten Days Before I Die)	3:15
