= Neo kyma =

Music genre and movement in Greek music

Néo kýma (Greek: Νέο Κύμα, pronounced [ˈneo ˈcima], translated as "new wave") is a Greek music genre which appeared during the so called Greek New Wave movement in the mid-1960s and lasted for about a decade. It was a mixture of entechno and French chansons; it was so named by Giannis Spanos after the French Nouvelle Vague. Most of the Greek New Wave artists released their songs through the Greek label LYRA.

== Notable artists ==
Notable Greek artists from the Neo Kyma movement include:

- Arleta
- Keti Chomata
- Kostas Hatzis
- Mariza Koch
- Rena Koumioti
- Notis Mavroudis
- Lakis Pappas
- Giannis Poulopoulos
- Dionysis Savvopoulos
- Giannis Spanos
- Mihalis Violaris
- Giorgos Zographos
- Popi Asteriadi

== See also ==
- Rebetiko
- Laiko
