= Thessaloniki Song Festival =

Greek song festival

- Genre: Greek music
- Dates: Variable
- Locations: Athens, Greece (1959–1961); Thessaloniki, Greece (1962–1997, 2005–2008)
- Years active: 1959–1997; 2005–2008

The Thessaloniki Song Festival (Greek: Φεστιβάλ Τραγουδιού Θεσσαλονίκης, IPA: [festiˈval traɣuˈðʝu θesaloˈnicis]), officially the Greek Song Festival (Greek: Φεστιβάλ Ελληνικού Τραγουδιού, IPA: [festiˈval eliniˈku traɣuˈðʝu]) was a Greek song festival hosted between 1959–1997 and 2005–2008. The host city of the event was initially Athens (1959–1961) but the contest was later moved to Thessaloniki, from which it got its name.

The festival was usually hosted at the Alexandreio Melathron in Thessaloniki.

== History ==
The three initial contests held in Athens were marked by the participation of important Greek musicians such as Manos Hatzidakis and Mikis Theodorakis, who won first prize two times and one time respectively. The first time the contest took place in Thessaloniki in 1962, it was organized by the Thessaloniki International Fair, in partnership with the Greek Music Association, at the stadium of the city's YMCA. The first contest in Thessaloniki also marked the start of Alkis Steas' career as presenter of the show from 1962 until 1980. The first song to win the Thessaloniki Song Festival was "Alysides" (Greek: Αλυσίδες, chains) by Kaiti Belinda.

In 1965 the Greek Music Association stopped supporting the event and was replaced by Greece's national broadcaster, the Hellenic Broadcasting Corporation. Additionally, 1965 also saw the introduction of a committee of judges responsible for determining the winning songs, which in previous years were selected through public voting. At the time, the contest was dominated by Greek New Wave in music.

The festival of 1972 was marked by two important events. First was that popular Greek singer Tolis Voskopoulos, who was one of the favorites to win the contest, was unable to sing once he walked on stage, which resulted in him being denounced by the public. In the 1972 Thessaloniki Song Festival pop band Nostradamos won the best new composer and performer prize with the song "Dos Mou to Heri Sou" (Give Me Your Hand) which became a huge success in Greece during the junta years. Additionally, the contest was marked by a number of camouflaged anti-dictatorial songs in opposition to the Regime of the Colonels, which was in power since 1967. 1974 saw another wave of songs with hidden political messages, this time inspired by the events that followed the collapse of the Greek dictatorship. The winning song of the 1974 edition implicitly referred to Konstantinos Karamanlis, Prime Minister of Greece following the collapse of the dictatorship.

In 1977, popular Greek singer Anna Vissi competed at the festival and won first place. 1980 saw the retirement of the festival's original host since 1962, Alkis Steas, and the participation of Cypriot Greek composer Manos Loizos in the contest. In 1981 and 1982 Manos Hatzidakis organised also a song contest festival in Corfu (city).

In 1991 Greek pop star Sakis Rouvas took part in the contest.

The contest was discontinued in 1997 due to lack of interest, and was later brought back to life in 2005, this time as a co-operation of the Hellenic Broadcasting Corporation, the Thessaloniki International Fair and the Ministry for Macedonia and Thrace. It was discontinued again in 2008.

== Winners ==
Winners of the Greek Song Festival
Year	Winners		
Year	First	Second	Third
1959	Nana Mouskouri	Nana Mouskouri & Trio Canzone	Giannos Vogiatzis
1960	Nana Mouskouri	Giovanna	Mairy Lo
1961	Mairy Linda	Nana Mouskouri	Giorgos Kouroupos
1962	Kaity Belinda	Nadia Konstantopoulou	Giovanna
1963	Giannis Vogiatzis	Tzeni Vanou	Tzeni Vanou
1964	Nadia Konstantopoulou	Tzeni Vanou	Cleio Denardou
1965	Soula Birbili	Giovanna	Giovanna
1966	Cleio Denardou	Zoe Kouroukli	Cleio Denardou
1967	Sotos Panagopoulos	Nadia Konstantopoulou	Giovanna
1968	Nikos Antoniou	Belinda	Giovanna
1969	Dimitris Beksevanakis	Giannis Vogiatzis	Giannis Petropoulos
1970	Giannis Vogiatzis	Tzoni Stratis	Panos Kokkinos
1971	Giannis Petropoulos	Cleio Denardou	Panos Kokkinos
1972	Doros Georgiadis	Cleio Denardou	Mihalis Violaris
1973	Dimitris Kontolazos	The Charms	Phryni
1974	Tonny Vavatsikos	Mihalis Violaris	Aleka Kanellidou
1975	Robert Williams	Dakis	Lakis Tzordaneli
1976	Maria Douraki		Dakis
1977	Anna Vissi	Antonis Politis	Michalis Violaris
1978	Christianna	Sofi Pappa	Stavros Sideras
1979	Giorgos Polychroniadis	Manos	Giannis Dimitras
1980	Tzina Spiliotopoulou	Betty Dima	Eleni Dimou
1981	Elena Dimou	Charoula Ntanou	Antypas Mousloumidis
1982	No awards given.		
1983	Petros Karalis	Dimitris Kamsaris	Kostas Thomaidis
1984	Sophia Vossou	Giorgos Marantzas	Notis Chasapis
1985	Christos Dalkos	Fotini Vazou	Dimitris Panagopoulos
1986	Nikos Miraitopoulos	Kostas Pratsinakis	Eleni Antoniadou
1987	Giannis Gardelis	Eleni Antoniou	Sotiris Daras
1988	Matoula Lambrou	Eleni Michalopoulou	Dimitris Nikoloudis
1989	Eleni Michalopoulou	Pegki Rousoudaki	Manolis Lidakis
1990	Giannis Dimitras^{1}		
1991	Anthi Tatsiouli		
1992	Dimitris Nezeritis		
1993	Kostas Vrettos		
1994	Katerina Siapanta	Marianna Kikiforou	Morfo Tsaireli
1995	Soula Stavrou	Makis Eleftheriou	Kostas Vassiliangos
1996	Pyrovates	Michalis Klontzas	Evgenia Grentzelou
1997	Nikos Karagiannis	Virginia Viktoros	Kostas Smokovitis
2005	Stavroula Arvanitopoulou	Sozos Liberopoulos	Efstathia
2006	Stavros Siolas	Thodoris Manolidis	Myronas Stratis
2007	Komis X	Irini Toumbaki	Dimitra Ligopsihaki
2008	Alexandros Goudas	18 Para Tetarto	Vangelis Kapsalis

Note: ^{1} Award later annulled as the song was not original.

== See also ==
- Music of Greece
