= Arleta (musician) =

Greek musician

- Born: Argyro-Nicoleta Tsapra; 3 March 1945; Athens, Greece
- Died: 8 August 2017 (aged 72) Athens, Greece
- Genres: Greek New Wave, éntekhno
- Occupations: Musician, songwriter, author, illustrator
- Instruments: Vocals, guitar
- Years active: 1960–2017
- Labels: Lyra, CBS, Columbia, Portrait, Ακτή, Legend

Arleta (Greek: Αρλέτα; 3 March 1945 – 8 August 2017; born Argyro-Nicoleta Tsapra, Αργυρώ-Νικολέτα Τσάπρα) was a Greek musician, author and book illustrator.

== Biography ==
Arleta was born in Athens on 3 March 1945 and studied at the Athens School of Fine Arts.

She published her first album of her own compositions (Η Αρλέτα τραγουδά, Arleta sings) in 1966 and became one of the leading figures of the Greek New Wave during the 1960s. At the beginning of her career she worked with many well-known Greek composers like Giannis Spanos, George Kontogiorgos, Manos Hatzidakis and Mikis Theodorakis. Her first great successes came with songs whose music was written by Lakis Papadopoulos and lyrics by Marianina Kriezi. She performed with great success in the Athens boîte scene. In 1997 she published a book, Από πού πάνε για την Άνοιξη (Which way to Spring), which was based on her songwriting and included her own illustrations.

On 11 February 2008, just a few minutes before a planned performance at Volos, Arleta suffered a stroke, which left her in hospital for six months and partly paralysed her for a year. with recovery after a lengthy hospitalization and year of rehabilitation. In January 2017, she suffered another stroke and remained in hospital, where she died on 8 August 2017, aged 72.

== Discography ==
Arleta released the following studio albums throughout her career:

- Τραγουδά η Αρλέτα (Arleta sings) (Lyra, 1966)
- Αρλέτα Νο. 2 (Arleta No. 2) (Lyra, 1967)
- Στο Ρυθμό του Αγέρα (In the Rhythm of the Wind) (Lyra, 1968)
- 12+1 Τραγούδια του Μάνου Χατζιδάκι (12+1 Songs of Manos Hatzidakis) (Lyra, 1969)
- Έξη Μέρες (Six Days) (Lyra, 1970)
- Ταξιδεύοντας (Travelling) (Lyra, 1976)
- Romancero Gitano (Lyra, 1978)
- Ένα Καπέλο με Τραγούδια (A Hat with Songs) (Lyra, 1981)
- Περίπου (Almost) (Lyra, 1984)
- Τσάι Γιασεμιού (Jasmine Tea) (CBS, 1985)
- Ζητάτε Να Σας Πω (You Ask Me to Say to You) (CBS, 1987)
- Δέκα και μία νύχτες (Ten and One Nights) (CBS, 1989)
- Εκτός Έδρας (Away) (CBS, 1989)
- Άσε τα Κρυφά Κρυμμένα (Let secrets remain hidden) (Columbia, 1991)
- Μετά Τιμής (With Honour) (Portrait, 1993)
- Έμπορος Ονείρων (Trader of Dreams) (Ακτή, 1995)
- Και Πάλι Χαίρετε (Hello to You Again) (Legend, 2009)
- Demo (Lyra, 2010)

== Illustrations ==
- Bertolt Brecht «Ο Μπαρμπα-Έντε» (Uncle Eddie's Moustache) – Children's Book (Οδυσσέας Editions, 1979; in Greek)
- Vladimir Mayakovsky «Το Αλογάκι-Φωτιά» (The Fire Horsey) – Children's Book (Οδυσσέας Editions, 1986; in Greek)

== See also ==
- Horse Stories
- Praise (film)
- Keti Chomata
- Mariza Koch
- Rena Koumioti
