= Dionysis Savvopoulos =

Greek singer-songwriter (1944–2025)

Dionysis Savvopoulos Διονύσης Σαββόπουλος
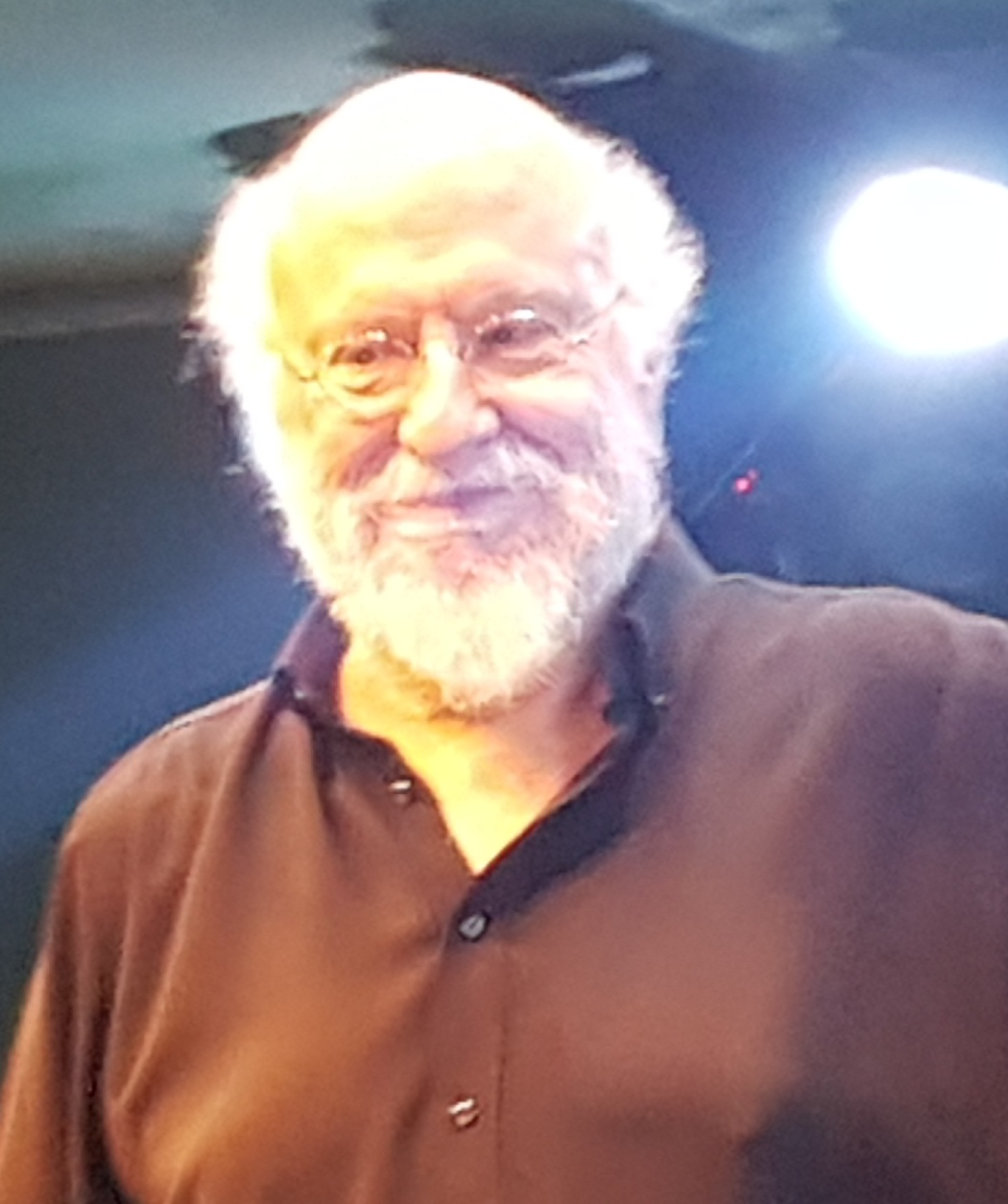
- Savvopoulos in 2020

Background information
- Born: 2 December 1944; Thessaloniki, Kingdom of Greece
- Died: 21 October 2025 (aged 80) Ygeia Hospital, Marousi, Greece
- Genres: Greek rock, laïko, Greek folk music, rebetika
- Years active: 1964–2025
- Spouse: Aspasia Arapidou (m. 1967)

Dionysis Savvopoulos (Greek: Διονύσης Σαββόπουλος; 2 December 1944 – 21 October 2025) was a Greek singer-songwriter. As a musician and songwriter, he made significant contributions to modern Greek music as part of the Greek New Wave.

== Early life and career ==
Savvopoulos was born in the city of Thessaloniki, Greece, in a middle-class family. He passed his university entrance exams and enrolled in the Aristotle University of Thessaloniki to study law, but after his first year of his studies, his passion for music and politics led to an argument with his father and he dropped out in 1963. Savvopoulos then hitchhiked on a truck to Athens and took various odd jobs, including working as a nude model for students in the Athens School of Fine Arts and as a journalist in a newspaper. In Athens, he began singing and playing guitar in various night clubs and became closely associated with the so-called Greek New Wave. Although Savvopoulos was not famed for his voice, his talent in songwriting impressed Alekos Patsifas, the director of the Lyra record company in Greece which was specializing in artists of the Greek New Wave, who signed him. Savvopoulos remained with this label until 1983.

His debut album To Fortigho ("The Truck" alluding to his hitchhiking experience) came out in 1966. Although critically well-received, it failed to chart, allegedly selling only 3,000 copies. Despite this, he was kept on the label's roster and continued with a string of highly successful albums, with self-penned songs combining arrangements reminiscent of early Frank Zappa and politically incisive lyrics in the style of Bob Dylan, with folk tunes from Macedonia, Thrace, and Rebetiko music.

Savvopoulos was noted for being politically active throughout his career in music. In 1967, Savvopoulos was briefly imprisoned and beaten for his political convictions by the Greek military junta of 1967–1974, led by the dictator George Papadopoulos.

Most of his songs were written by himself (both lyrics and music). Until his death, he was singing but no longer composing (since his last studio album as a songwriter, O chronopios). Throughout his career, he sang Greek rock, Laïko (Greek folk music) and Rebetika.

== Personal life and death ==
Savvopoulos was married to Aspasia Arapidou. They had two sons, Kornilios and Romanos, and two grandsons, Dionysis and Andreas.

Savvopoulos died from a heart attack, at Ygeia Hospital, on 21 October 2025, at age 80. At the time of his death, he had also been suffering from cancer. He was buried at the First Cemetery of Athens following a state funeral.

== Discography ==
=== Studio albums ===
- 1966 Fortigho (Φορτηγό; Truck)
- 1969 To perivoli tou trelou (Το περιβόλι του τρελού; The Fool's Garden)
- 1970 Ballos (Μπάλλος)
- 1972 Vromiko psomi (Βρώμικο ψωμί; Dirty Bread)
- 1975 Deka chronia kommatia (Δέκα χρόνια κομμάτια; Ten Years' Pieces)
- 1976 Happy day, soundtrack for the eponymous film by Pantelis Voulgaris
- 1977 Acharnis, O Aristofanis pou gyrise apo ta thymarakia (Αχαρνείς, Ο Αριστοφάνης που γύρισε από τα θυμαράκια; The Acharnians, Aristophanes who came back from the dead)
- 1979 I Rezerva (Η Ρεζέρβα; The Spare)
- 1983 Trapezakia exo (Τραπεζάκια έξω; Tables Out)
- 1989 To kourema (Το κούρεμα; The haircut)
- 1994 Mi petaxis tipota (Μη πετάξεις τίποτα; Don't Throw Anything Away)
- 1996 Parartima A (Παράρτημα Α'; Appendix A)
- 1997 To xenodochio (Το ξενοδοχείο; The Hotel)
- 1999 O chronopios (Ο Xρονοποιός; The time-maker)
- 2008 O Samanos (Ο Σαμάνος; The Shaman), with Thanassis Papakonstantinou
- 2023 Zeibekiko II digital single (Ζεϊμπέκικο ΙΙ) with Sotiria Bellou, Marina Satti and Mikros Kleftis.

=== Live recordings ===
- 1983 Ikosi chronia dromos (Είκοσι χρόνια δρόμος: ζωντανές ηχογραφήσεις; 20 years' Road: Live Recordings)
- 1988 O kyrios Savvopoulos efcharisti ton kyrio Hadjidaki kai tha 'rthi opposdipote (Ο κύριος Σαββόπουλος ευχαριστεί τον κύριο Χατζιδάκι και θα 'ρθει όπωσδηποτε; Mr. Savvopoulos Thanks Mr. Hadjidakis And Will Definitely Attend)
- 1990 Anadromi 63–89 (Αναδρομή 63–89; Retrospective 63–89)
- 2001 Savvorama (Σαββόραμα)
- 2007 O pyrinas (Ο πυρήνας; The Nucleus)
- 2016 Siko psichi moy dose revma (Σήκω ψυχή μου δώσε ρεύμα; Rise soul of mine the power turn on) with Eleni Vitali

== Bibliography ==
- 2003, Hē Souma 1963-2003 (Η Σούμα 1963-2003) (Lyrics) Ianos Bookstores Publications, Athens.
- 2025, Giati ta chronia trechoun chyma (Γιατί τα χρόνια τρέχουν χύμα) (Autobiography) Patakis Publishers, Athens.

== See also ==
- List of Greeks
