= Giannis Poulopoulos =

Greek singer (1941–2020)

Giannis Poulopoulos Γιάννης Πουλόπουλος
- Born: 29 June 1941; Kardamyli, Hellenic State
- Died: 23 August 2020 (aged 79) Haidari, Greece
- Genres: Laïko
- Occupation: Musician
- Instrument: Vocals

Giannis Poulopoulos (Greek: Γιάννης Πουλόπουλος, a.k.a. John Poulopoulos; 29 June 1941 – 23 August 2020) was a Greek singer-songwriter, who had several hits in Greece during the 1960s, 1970s, and 1980s. In terms of total album sales, he is the fourth biggest-selling Greek singer of all time.

== Life ==
Poulopoulos was born on 29 June 1941, in Kardamyli. Shortly after his birth, his parents, originally from Messenia, moved to the Saint Ierotheos region of Peristeri, near Athens. Poulopoulos liked singing from an early age. Prompted by friends, he unsuccessfully sought an audition with Columbia Records, while also working as a builder, playing football in Saint Ierotheos for Atromitos F.C., and producing oil paintings.

Aged 19, Poulopoulos secured auditions with Mikis Theodorakis, Apostolos Kaldaras, Vassilis Tsitsanis, and Giannis Papaioannou, and sang two songs, Mana mou kai Panagia ("My Mother and the Madonna") and Parapono ("Complaint").

Poulopoulos impressed Theodorakis at his first audition, and Theodorakis arranged for Poulopoulos to sing three songs in a theatrical production by Nikos Kourkoulos and Tzeni Karezi of Iakovos Kambanellis's play, The Neighbourhood of Angels. Grigoris Bithikotsis later performed cover versions of the first three songs ("Set a table for two," "Glory to God" and "Bread is on the Table") that Poulopoulos recorded.

Poulopoulos sang regularly in a music hall in Plaka. He recorded four or five 45rpm disks for Columbia Records, which are now difficult to find as he soon agreed to record for Lyra, for whom he recorded three songs by Mikis Theodorakis. In 1965 he was the first performer of four songs written by Manos Loïzos. Around the same time he also had a successful hit with Mi mu thymonis matia mou (Don't be angry with me, my love) composed by Stavros Koujioumtzis. Later on he recorded songs by George Kontogeorgos, included in the LP "Gyspy Day".

By 1966, his records were being distributed more widely, and his songs were featured in films. In Oi Stigmatismenoi ("The Stigmatized"), which starred Giorgos Foundas and Maro Kodou, he sang "Very late" and "I love you" with Helen Kladi. In O Tetraperatos ("The Cunning") with Kostas Chatzichristos he sang "In Piraeus, in Piraeus" by Giorgos Katsaros, and in the romantic comedy Tzeni-Tzeni he and Tzeni Karezi performed a song by Giannis Markopoulos.

He died in Haidari, at age 79, following chronic heart problems.
