= Hello Anatolia =

2013 American documentary film

- Directed by: Chrysovalantis Stamelos
- Written by: Chrysovalantis Stamelos
- Produced by: Chrysovalantis Stamelos
- Music by: Yannis Saoulis
- Production companies: Crescent Street Films, LLC
- Release dates: March 19, 2013 (Athens premiere); October 4, 2013 (New York premiere); September 18, 2014 (Izmir premiere)
- Running time: 90 minutes
- Languages: English; Turkish; Greek

Hello Anatolia is a 2013 American documentary film written, directed, and produced by Greek-American filmmaker Chrysovalantis Stamelos. The film follows Stamelos as he leaves his job in New York City and moves to İzmir (Smyrna), Turkey, to trace his family's roots in Anatolia. The film documents his exploration of the city's neighbourhoods, his interviews with members of the remaining Greek community of Turkey, and his engagement with the region's music and culture. Its title alludes to the novel Farewell Anatolia (Benden Selam Söyle Anadolu'ya) by Dido Sotiriou.

- Hello Anatolia Documentary on YouTube

== Synopsis ==
Hello Anatolia documents the personal journey of Stamelos, a Greek-American who decides to trace the footsteps of his great-grandparents, who were among the Greeks who left Anatolia following the population exchange between Greece and Turkey. After visiting Turkey for a friend's wedding in 2008, Stamelos decided to relocate there, and in 2010 he settled in İzmir.

The film follows his reconnection with his Anatolia ancestry through the city's neighbourhoods, interviews with Greeks still living in Turkey, and the local art and culture. According to Stamelos, he titled the film Hello Anatolia because, for him, the greeting represented starting "new relationships with a fresh mind".

The documentary features an appearance by the Greek singer Glykeria, who discusses the shared roots of Greek and Turkish music, and also includes the singer Fide Köksal and the chef Maria Ekmekçioğlu.

== Production ==
Pre-production for Hello Anatolia began in the spring of 2010, when Stamelos officially moved to İzmir. Over the course of ten months, locations were scouted, and remnants of the surviving Greek-speaking communities of Anatolia were located. Upon development, the Greek America Foundation launched a grassroots fundraising campaign on Kickstarter.com, which raised more than $6,400.

Production took place between 2011 and 2013. Filming occurred throughout the city of İzmir, including historical locations such as the home of Aristotle Onassis, the office of the Consulate General of Greece in Smyrna, and the historical village of Çeşme, where Stamelos reconnected with his family's roots. The team also filmed in Istanbul, capturing footage of historic landmarks including the Greek Orthodox Patriarchate of Saint George, the Apogevmatini Istanbul-Greek newspaper headquarters, and the Hellenic Cultural Center in Pera (Beyoğlu).

Post-production took place with three teams in Turkey, Greece, and New York. The film's soundtrack was produced by international musician and composer Yannis Saoulis, based in Thessaloniki, Greece. The film was produced by Crescent Street Films, LLC, and executive produced by Gregory Pappas with the support of the Greek America Foundation.

== Release ==
Hello Anatolia premiered at The American College of Greece on March 19, 2013, as part of the celebration of Founders Day 2013. It had its New York City premiere on October 4, 2013, at the Museum of the Moving Image as part of the New York City Greek Film Festival. The screening sold out, and a second show was added.

The film has screened at numerous festivals and venues internationally, including:

- The American College of Greece – Deree (Athens)
- Thessaloniki Documentary Film Festival (2013)
- Transatlantyk Film Festival in Poznań, Poland (2013)
- New York City Greek Film Festival (2013) – Official Opener
- Sismanoglio Megaro of the Consulate General of Greece in Istanbul (March 14, 2014)
- French Cultural Center in İzmir (September 18, 2014)

According to the Greek America Foundation, the film aired on WTTW and Cosmote History. It later aired on Greece's Cosmote History Channel. The film was also selected for screenings by Harvard University, Yale University, and the Newhouse School of Communications at Syracuse University, Stamelos' alma mater.

== Home media ==
In January 2016, the film became available online on Vimeo On Demand. In June 2021, the Greek America Foundation made the documentary available to stream for free online.

== See also ==
- Greek Americans
- Smyrna
- Population exchange between Greece and Turkey
