= Nexus (Greek band) =

Greek industrial rock band

Nexus Πλέγμα
- Origin: Athens, Greece
- Genres: Rock; gothic rock; industrial
- Years active: 1999–2005
- Label: Cyberdelia Records
- Past members: Mike Pougounas, Lefteris Strouggaris, Vangelis Papachristopoulous, Costas Spanos, Dimitris "Sidheog" Steves, Panos Economakis

Nexus was a Greek industrial rock band formed by vocalist/keyboardist Mike Pougounas. He was joined by guitarist Lefteris Strouggaris, drummer Vangelis Papachristopoulos, and bassist Costas Spanos. Pougounas and Strouggaris were fresh off of membership with The Flowers Of Romance, a pioneering Greek gothic rock band.

Nexus built on The Flowers Of Romance’s innovations; they were the first industrial group of the Greek rock underground. While Nexus had a more mainstream sound than the Flowers Of Romance, Nexus continued The Flowers Of Romance’s tradition of incorporating countless musical styles into one base style. Nexus received critical and fan acclaim across the European and U.S. underground industrial scenes, making Nexus the second consecutive Mike Pougounas-formed group to become internationally renowned.

== History ==
Internal strife and undesirable management placed so much strain on The Flowers Of Romance that in 1998, frontman Mike Pougounas and guitarist Lefteris Strouggaris left the band. Pougounas formed Nexus and was joined by Strouggaris, ex-Divorce drummer Vangelis Papachristopoulos, and Costas Spanos.

In 1999, Nexus released the self-titled single, Nexus (EP), through FM Records. In December of that same year, ex-The Drops drummer Dimitris "Sidhéog" Steves replaced Vangelis Papachristopoulos.

Nexus left FM Records and Pougounas created Cyberdelia Records on March 9, 2000, immediately adding Nexus to its stable. On May 19, 2000, Nexus released their debut album titled 6 and fans were witness to a bold move by Nexus: unlike albums of The Flowers Of Romance, 6 was entirely in Greek. On the same day of 6’s release, Nexus opened for world-famous The Mission in Thessaloniki after being invited to play by The Mission’s frontman Wayne Hussey, who was instrumental in the success of The Flowers Of Romance’s final album.

February 28, 2001 saw the release of Nexus’s second album, Cybernaut. Nexus reverted to English-language songs with Cybernaut, and this proved to be a wise decision, as Cybernaut was possibly Nexus’s most well-received album by media and fans in both Greece and abroad. Cybernaut had a wider European release than any Mike Pougounas-band album since the Flowers Of Romance’s Brilliant Mistakes, and even saw limited release in the United States.

Lefteris Strouggaris left Nexus in 2001, and the remaining members of the band decided to keep the full-time roster to a trio while using a part-time guitarist. Former Flowers Of Romance guitarist Panos Economakis, a close friend of the full-time Nexus members, was chosen.

The 2002 release of Nexus’s third album Wrapped In Cellophane showcased a further evolution of the band’s sound, mixing aggressive guitar riffs with an electronic harmony. George "Rakos" Kagialedakis directed the music video for the song “Wrapped In Cellophane”, Nexus’s first music video, and it was placed into rotation on Greek national television as well as foreign market television.

In the year of Wrapped In Cellophane’s release, Nexus appeared on the July/August issue of German Music Magazine ZILLO which featured an interview with the band and the track "These Tears Again" in the magazine’s sampler.

Former Flowers Of Romance member George Bousounis and sound engineer George Ginnis aided in the creation of what would be Nexus’s final album, December 2004’s The Beat Syndicate. For reasons that aren’t clear to the fans, the Nexus trio called it quits in May 2005, and Cyberdelia Records ceased operations not long after.

The trio wouldn’t sit still for long; in 2006, Pougounas, Spanos, and Steves formed post-punk band New Zero God.

== Trivia ==
- Mike Pougounas and George Kagialedakis, who made Nexus’s first music video, worked together again in conceptualizing, directing, and producing the 2009 documentary “Back in Black: History Is Made By The Bands, Vol.1.”
- Nexus is named after the androids in the Ridley Scott movie “Blade Runner".

== Discography ==
- 1998 - Nexus (EP) (CD Release / Released in Greece, Distributed Internationally)
- 2000 - 6 (CD Released / Release in Greece, Distributed Internationally)
- 2001 - Cybernaut (CD Release / Released in Greece, Distributed Internationally)
- 2002 - Wrapped In Cellophane (CD Release / Released in Greece, Distributed Internationally)
- 2004 - The Beat Syndicate (CD Release / Released in Greece, Distributed Internationally)
