= New Zero God =

Greek gothic/post-punk band

- Origin: Athens, Greece
- Genres: Rock, gothic rock, post punk, industrial music
- Years active: 2006–present
- Members: Mike Pougounas, John Psimopoulos, Michalis Semertzoglou, Panagiotis Arsenis
- Past members: Averkios Hadjiantoniadis, Costas Spanos, Babis “B-abyss” Diakoumeas, Elias “E-raptor” Raptis, Michael Christou, Achilleas “Lao” Geromoschose, Dimitris “Sidheog” Steves, Apostolos Takos, Harris Stavrakas, Akis Nikolaidis, Babis Efthimiou

New Zero God is a Greek Gothic/Post Punk rock band formed in 2006 by frontman and vocalist Mike Pougounas, bassist Costas Spanos, drummer Dimitris “Sidheog” Steves, and guitarist Averkios Hadjiantoniadis.

New Zero God's popularity in Greece may be due to the veteran musicians who make up the band; as most Greek rock fans were already familiar with Mike Pougounas and Averkios Hadjiantoniadis from The Flowers Of Romance, which is considered a legendary Greek gothic rock group. Costas Spanos and Dimitris Steves played with Pougounas in his previous band, Nexus. While New Zero God is billed as a post-punk group, their sound may lack any true classification, as their current style is a culmination of a musical evolution that began with The Flowers Of Romance's pure punk style, later gothic rock style, and then Nexus's industrial style.

== History ==
Although Mike Pougounas's Cyberdelia Records closed in 2005 and Nexus disbanded along with it, Pougounas, Steves, and Spanos did not go their separate ways. They instead formed New Zero God a year later, reuniting Pougounas and Hadjiantoniadis who played together in The Flowers Of Romance before Hadjiantoniadis left the group to tour Europe.

New Zero God has been performing primarily around Greece, especially Athens, playing new songs as well as covers of Flowers Of Romance songs. New Zero God has performed at several notable shows thus far, such as opening for the Legendary Pink Dots and Christian Death. In 2007, after the departures of Hadjiantoniadis and Spanos from the lineup, they were replaced by guitarist Elias “E-raptor” Raptis and bassist Babis “B-abyss” Diakoumeas.

New Zero God completed production on their debut album, Fun is A Four Letter Word, in 2009, and digitally released their album that same year. During recording, New Zero God's “In Your Dreams Again” was featured on the 4-part compilation set Because God Told Me To Do It. Additionally, the band was featured in “Back In Black”, a 2009 documentary film by George Kagialedakis about the Greek rock scene, and they were also interviewed and featured on a Greek TV show. After having been signed on the day they finished recording, their debut album, "Fun Is A Four Letter Word" was physically released in January 2010 by Puzzlemusik Records.

During June 2010, Michael Christou of the popular bands, Panx Romana and Avaton, joined the folds as second guitarist. When B-Abyss and E-Raptor left to further pursue their own band in December 2010, Harris Stavrakas signed on as bassist, much to the delight of fans from The Flowers Of Romance days.

A number of interviews and reviews in English, American, German, Italian, and Spanish magazines such as MUEN [USA], CARPE NOCTURNE [USA], DOMINION [UK], and TERRORIZER [UK] quickly followed in 2011 as the band gained recognition. During May 2011, singer Mike Pougounas was invited to take part in an international cover release to benefit England's ‘The Sophie Lancaster Foundation’ (S.O.P.H.I.E.). June and July 2011 then brought New Zero God onto the UK radio charts with their song, “Kiss The Witch”, as cited by the UK's Dominion Magazine.

On December 22, 2011, Second Chance was released as a Special Edition single under the name NEW ZERO GOD & FRIENDS. Written by Dimitris “Sidheog” Steves and Mike Pougounas, a number of international musicians joined the members of New Zero God for the charity fundraiser to benefit the American foundation, H.A.W.C. (Healing Abuse, Working for Change). “Second Chance” remained at the #1 spot on the USA's CD Baby Goth and Glam charts for the whole of January, 2012.

The New Zero God 7-track Limited-Edition Collector's EP, Club Bizarre, was released on July 4, 2012, through Secret Sin Records [UK] and featured their new exclusive UK-release track, "Widow's Walk". The EP quickly sold out.

On August 1, 2012, it was announced that Achilleas “Lao” Geromoschos had joined New Zero God on guitars. Achilleas was a Flowers Of Romance member from 1985 to 1990, having been the original guitar player of the songs “Kashmir” and “Autumn Kids”. This new line-up was almost identical to Pougounas' first band, The Flowers Of Romance, during their 1987 era. The only exception being New Zero God's original drummer and co-founding member, Dimitris "Sidheog" Steves. One month later, New Zero God wrapped up filming for their appearance in the movie, “Athens Drift”, a UK film release by Paul Druce.

Their 10-track guitar-driven Gothic/Post Punk studio album, "MMXIII", was released on January 13, 2013. This was their second release through UK label Secret Sin Records. "The Night Calls Your Name" became the band's third annual charity contribution song and was released on 25 March 2013. New Zero God teamed up with symphonic power metal vocalist Maxi Nil (Visions of Atlantis, ex-Elysion, ex-On Thorns I Lay) on backing vocals for this Special Edition Charity Fundraiser for the UK-based Sophie Lancaster Foundation (S.O.P.H.I.E.).

The band announced their newest guitarist, Apostolos "MadzTuxedo" Takos (ex-The Drops) on July 17, 2013, and on October 18, 2013, released their third single, "Destination Unknown". This two-track release served as a prelude to their limited-edition coloured vinyl collector's single under the same title, which was released on December 13, 2013.

In keeping with the charitable spirit of New Zero God's effort to make at least one significant contribution each year, on January 29, 2014, the band took part in the "Festival To Benefit M.K.I.E.". The event was organized by Mike Pougounas through The Greek Underground Scene with the specific aim of gathering medicines for those less fortunate through the Μητροπολιτικό ΚοινωνικόΙατρείο Ελληνικού (M.K.I.E.).

"MMXIII", the Revisited and Remastered Greek Edition by B-Otherside Records was released on February 5, 2014.

== Discography ==
Studio Albums

- 2009 – Fun Is A Four Letter Word (Digital CD Release)
- 2010 – Fun Is A Four Letter Word (Physical CD Release, Puzzlemusik Records)
- 2013 – MMXIII (Physical CD Release, Secret Sin Records, UK)
- 2014 – MMXIII, Revisited & Remastered, The Greek Edition (Physical CD Release, b-otherside Records, GR)
- 2016 – Short Tales & Tall Shadows (Physical CD & Digital Release, Self-Release)

Mini Albums

- 2012 – Club Bizarre (Limited-Edition Collector's EP, Secret Sin Records, UK)
- 2015 – ZONA PERICOLOSA - Recorded LIVE at Ekidna (Modena, Italy) - 18 April 2015 (Digital CD, Self-Release)

"EP"

- 2017 - Under The Influence of Captain Pan Ikatac (Cassette and Digital CD, Self-Release)

Singles and EPs

- 2011 – Second Chance (Digital Single, Special Edition to Benefit H.A.W.C., US)
- 2013 – The Night Calls Your Name (Digital Single, Special Edition to Benefit S.O.P.H.I.E., UK - Feat. Maxi Nil)
- 2013 – Destination Unknown (Digital Single, self-released)
- 2013 – Destination Unknown (Limited-Edition Coloured Vinyl Single, Surgut Resort Records, GR)
- 2016 – Airport (Free Digital Download - Cover, The Motors [written by Andy McMaster] - Feat. Cruel Britannia)
- 2018 – Summer Wine (Free Digital Download - Cover, Lee Hazlewood and Nancy Sinatra [written by Lee Hazlewood] - Feat. Anachistwood)

Split Single

- 2016 – Redemption [New Zero God] | Madhouse Magical [Savage Cut featuring Bobby Deans] (Limited Edition 7" Vinyl Split Single Release)

Compilations

- 2009 – Because God Told Me To Do It (4-CD Compilation)
- 2010 – Lollipop Magazine Fall 2009 (Boston, MA USA)
- 2010 – Muz1ne #Δ Γκραντ Φινάλ (Greece)
- 2011 – Devolution Magazine (UK - August 2011)
- 2011 – Gothic Vision III (Germany - October 2011)
- 2012 – The Blackout Crypthology (UK - April 2012)
- 2012 – Sombrati Records - An Earth In Darkness (Brazil)
- 2013 – A Deadfall Compilation, Volume 1 - Darkness Descends (UK)
- 2013 – The Greek Underground Scene - 2013 Compilation (Greece)
- 2013 – Xperiment XIII - Wicked Trax (Australia)
- 2013 – A Deadfall Compilation, Volume 2 - Shadows Rise (UK)
- 2014 – Intravenous Magazine's Blood Pack, Vol. 1 (UK)
- 2014 – A Deadfall Compilation, Volume 3 - Dark Secrets (UK)
- 2015 – For The Bats, Volume II (Australia)
- 2015 – Mislealia Records - Voices of Mislealia, Vol. I (Italy)
- 2015 – A Deadfall Compilation, Volume 4 - Absolution (UK)

== See also ==
- Greek rock
- The Flowers Of Romance
- Nexus
