= Mike Pougounas =

Greek musician and independent filmmaker

- Born: Athens, Greece
- Genres: Rock, gothic rock, post-punk, industrial music
- Occupations: Singer-songwriter, musician, film director
- Instruments: Vocals, keyboards
- Years active: 1981–present
- Label: Various
- Website: http://www.myspace.com/mike_poug

Mike Pougounas is a Greek vocalist, songwriter, keyboardist, record label owner and independent filmmaker who is most notable for his contributions to Greek rock during his time as the frontman for Greek punk and gothic rock pioneers The Flowers of Romance from 1981 to 1998. Following the breakup of The Flowers of Romance in 1998, Mike Pougounas would both found a new band Nexus, and in 2000, the Cyberdelia Record Label. After the end of Nexus and Cyberdelia in 2005, Mike Pougounas formed New Zero God.

Mike Pougounas' three-decade career has made him an influential and respected performing artist not only in Greece, but also within Europe as a whole.

== Early life ==
Growing up in the poor Athenian neighborhood known as Tzitzifies-Kallithea, Mike Pougounas took an interest in Greek punk at the age of 13, and started playing live shows during that year as well.

== The Flowers of Romance ==
In 1981, at the age of 16, Mike Pougounas would form The Gift, later renamed The Flowers Of Romance after a pre-Sex Pistols band in which Sid Vicious was the drummer. In his position as The Flowers Of Romance's front man, Mike Pougounas would continue to hone his talents as a lead vocalist, songwriter, and keyboardist. Influenced by the many musical styles of the 1980s such as dark wave and punk, Mike Pougounas and the Flowers Of Romance would often incorporate these styles into their early work, which resulted in a unique punk sound that made them very popular in the underground Greek rock scene.

Mike Pougounas encountered international notoriety with the Flowers Of Romance's Dorian Grey LP, and by this time the band's style had evolved into gothic rock. As a result, Mike Pougounas was responsible for the first Greek gothic rock album to be released internationally.

The Flowers Of Romance's sound would continue to evolve through the 1990s, though they never truly departed from their punk and gothic rock roots. In 1995, Mike Pougounas and The Mission frontman Wayne Hussey met and began collaborating on what would be the last album of the Flowers of Romance, Brilliant Mistakes. With Hussey's help ensuring that Brilliant Mistakes could reach a broader media market, 1996's Brilliant Mistakes became The Flowers of Romance's most successful offering.

Unfortunately, failure from the band's managers in promoting a long-planned European tour combined with Pougounas' growing discontent caused a great deal of friction between the Flowers of Romance; Mike Pougounas left the band in 1998, causing the group to disband. Pougounas had been the sole member of the band to stay through the entirety of their 18-year career.

== Nexus, Cyberdelia Records, and New Zero God ==
After leaving The Flowers of Romance, Pougounas formed the first Greek industrial band, Nexus. Pougounas also created Cyberdelia Records on 9 March 2000, and on 19 May, Cyberdelia released Nexus's debut album in Greek, entitled 6.

Both Cyberdelia and Nexus would be successful ventures for Mike Pougounas, as Nexus would attain levels of popularity on par with, if not surpassing, The Flowers of Romance. Cyberdelia Records released albums for popular European bands such as Wayne Hussey's The Mission. In 2005, both Cyberdelia and Nexus disbanded, and a year later Mike Pougounas formed the post-punk New Zero God along with Nexus members Costas Spanos and Dimitris "Sidheog" Steves.

Mike Pougounas is currently New Zero God's lead vocalist, and in November 2009 plan to release their debut album, Fun Is A Four Letter Word.

== Independent film making ==
Vlad the Demon, a graduation assignment of Mike Pougounas while he was studying as a film director in 1986, served as his first experiment in independent film. The 9-minute short film was a comedy that paid homage to 1920s horror expressionism, and was rediscovered in 2008 by Rag Films. After sound manipulation, Mike Pougounas won a directorial award for Vlad the Demon at The 10th Independent Panorama of International Film and Video Makers, Patras City, 2008.

Mike Pougounas and George Kagialedakis conceptualized “Back In Black: History Is Made By The Bands, Vol.1”, a documentary film produced by Rag Films about the Greek rock scene, Greek rock bands, and the survival of both within a seemingly under-appreciative industry. The documentary is currently touring the international film festival circuit, with a possible theatrical release scheduled for late 2009. Mike Pougounas was responsible for the interviews in “Back in Black” as well as the male vocals for the Rag songs “My Life” and “Rock’n’Roll Puppet” while playing the keyboards on the song “From Hell”, which appears on the soundtrack of the documentary.
