= Elli Pappa =

Greek writer and activist (1920–2009)

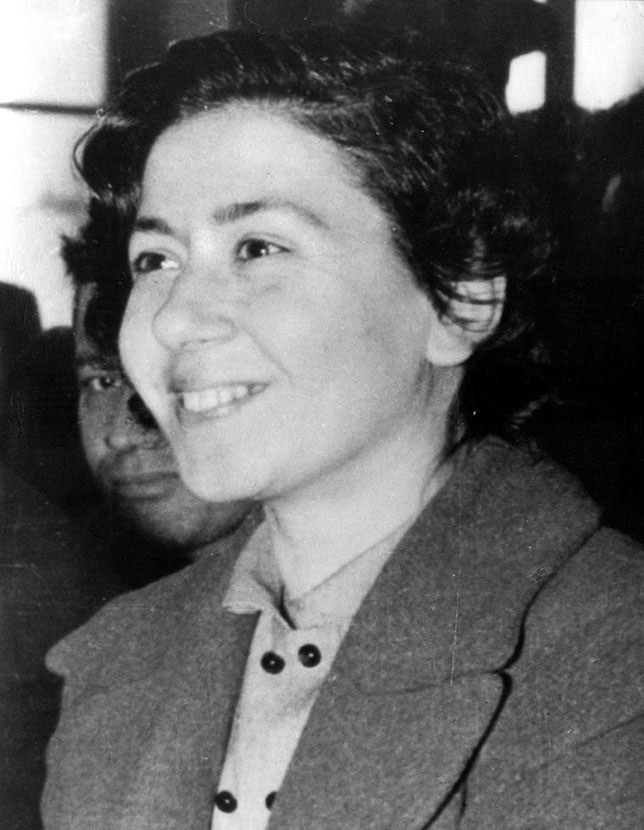
- Pappa during her second trial in 1952
- Born: 1920; Smyrna (under Greek military occupation)
- Died: 27 October 2009 (aged 88–89); Athens, Greece
- Occupations: Writer, journalist
- Partner: Nikos Beloyannis
- Relatives: Dido Sotiriou (sister)
- Writing career
- Language: Greek
- Genres: Political theory, history, biography

Elli Pappa (formerly Ioannidou; 1920 – 27 October 2009) was a Greek writer and activist. She was the sister of Greek author Dido Sotiriou and the partner of Nikos Beloyannis, with whom she had a son in 1951. As a member of the Communist Party of Greece, Pappa worked in the newspaper Rizospastis during the years of the Greek Resistance, and continued contributing articles during and after the Greek Civil War until her arrest in December 1950.

== Career ==
Pappa became known internationally in 1952 when a campaign for clemency against the death sentence given to her by the military tribunal in Athens saw a letter from her prison cell published across the world. Her account of these events and consequent imprisonment was published in the book Martyries mias diadromis (2010). It contains two parts, which were the two large files she had deposited with a museum archive in the 1990s to be published after her death. It narrates her life after the end of the Second World War until her release from prison in 1964, concentrating on conveying her own experience of these events while detailing historical facts.

Her writings on political theory include the book The Ancient Greek Philosophers in Karl Marx's 'Capital' (1983), in which ancient Greek philosophical texts and their use by Karl Marx in his book Capital are examined, and the journal article 'Machiavelli versus Marx' (1992), which was based on an earlier conference paper.

== Cultural references ==
Nikos Tzimas's film The Man with the Carnation (1980) tells the story of Beloyannis (played by Foivos Gikopoulos) in the post-Civil War period. It includes many scenes with Pappa (played by Mirka Papakonstantinou), who worked with him when he arrived in Athens in June 1950 and remained close to him during their trials and the consequent execution of Beloyannis and his associates.
