= Dido Sotiriou =

Greek novelist, journalist, and playwright (1909–2004)

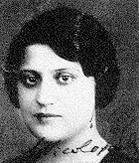
- Born: 18 February 1909; Aydın, Ottoman Empire
- Died: 23 September 2004 (aged 95); Athens, Greece
- Occupations: Novelist, journalist, and playwright
- Relatives: Elli Pappa (sister)

Dido Sotiriou (née Pappa; alternative spellings: Dido Sotiriu, Dido Sotiriyu; Greek: Διδώ Σωτηρίου; 18 February 1909 – 23 September 2004) was a Greek novelist, journalist, and playwright.

== Life ==
Sotiriou was born in Aydın, in western Anatolia and at that time part of the Ottoman Empire, as the daughter of Evangelos Pappas and Marianthi Papadopoulou, in a wealthy and polyglot bourgeois Rûm family who lived in a stately home. Her childhood, Sotiriou said, appeared to her as an "endless fairy tale". She had two older and two younger siblings. After her father, an entrepreneur, went bankrupt and her family became poor, Dido, who at that time was about eight years old, was sent to her wealthy uncle and his wife in Athens, where later she was educated. Sotiriou later described this separation from her family as "my first experience as a refugee". In 1919 the family moved to Smyrna (now İzmir), at that time occupied by Greece, but in 1922 Turkey repulsed the Greek invasion of Asia Minor (Greek-Turkish War), and Sotiriou's family had to leave Smyrna because of the inferno and slaughter that ensued in 1922, (book by Marjorie Housepian).

The family landed in the port of Piraeus, where the father worked in the docks and on ships as a clerk. In Athens, she was raised in her aunt's house in the affluent, middle-class milieu. There she completed her studies, attending the French Institute and having as teachers Kostas Paroritis and Sophia Mavroeidis-Papadakis, and later attending the Sorbonne. However, as she herself explained, she developed in that period a strong sense of social justice, especially because of the contrast between her own privileged situation and the humble way of living of her parents and siblings. She became a member of the union and so came to the leftist movement. In 1933, she joined the anti-fascist front. In 1935, she met in Geneva Vladimir Lenin’s comrade Alexandra Kollontai and in 1945, she was cofounder of the Women’s International Democratic Federation in Paris. In 1936 she began her career as a journalist. She fought against the dictatorship of Ioannis Metaxas and later, in the period of Axis occupation, she joined the Communist Party of Greece and worked for an underground anti-fascist newspaper.

Sotiriou declared in a 1989 interview that since the beginning of her political engagement in 1932, she always stood "on the left wing". She was proud of having waived both her inheritance and the patrimony of her aunt, having the goal of being free and being able to do what she wanted.

Traveling to Paris, she met writers as André Malraux, André Gide and Louis Aragon. In the 1950s, she herself began to write novels, "to tell the truth."

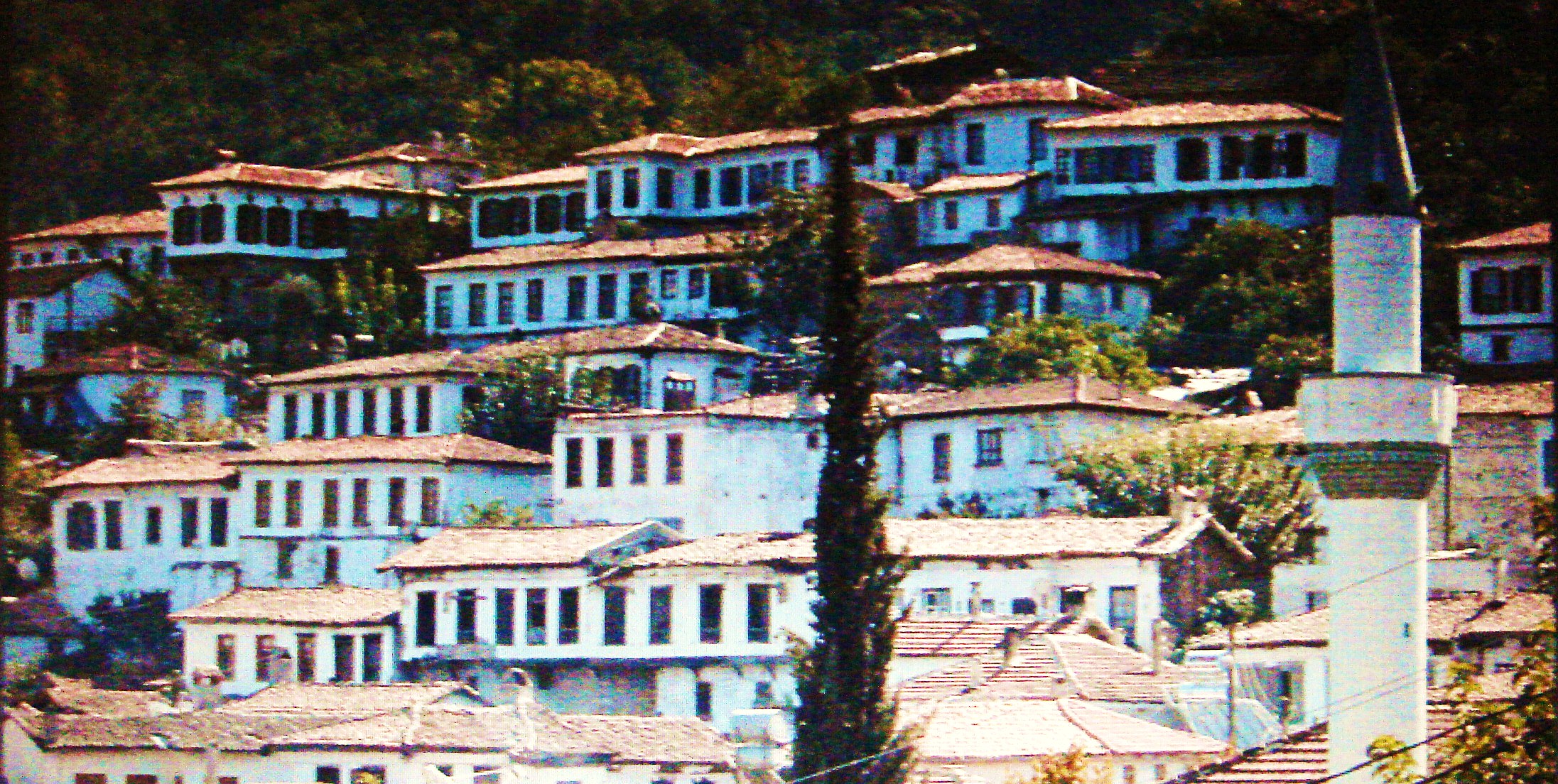
The protagonists of "Farewell Anatolia" live in a little Greek Village near Ephesus, like Şirince (pictured).

In 1959, she published her first novel, The Dead Await ("Οι νεκροί περιμένουν"). In 1962 appeared Bloody Earth ("Ματωμένα Χώματα"; title of the English edition: "Farewell Anatolia"), probably her greatest success. The book deals with the trauma of the Greek-Turkish population exchange and the expulsion of Greeks from Asia Minor. In the preface Sotiriou mentions that she wrote the novel on the basis of the memories of a little Asia Minor farmer named Axiotis Manolis, who had lived the events as an eyewitness. From his perspective, the book is written in first person. The book was (and still is) also very popular in Turkey, probably because, as the author said, "there are no evil Greek and Turk, but only people who are victims and pay dear for it". The book has been reprinted sixty-five times in Greece and translated into six languages, including Turkish in 1970 and French in 1996. Subject of a novel published in 1976, Commandment ("Εντολή"), is the time of the Greek Civil War and the secret machinations against the Greek democracy. Depicted therein is the fate of Nikos Beloyannis, a Communist resistance fighter who was executed in 1952. Another work is Katedafizometha ("Shattered"), appeared in 1982.

Sotiriou was chief editor of a women's magazine, Gynaika ("Woman"), and foreign policy commentator on various newspapers, as Neos Kosmos ("New World") and the Greek Communist Party's daily Rizospastis, where she became editor-in-chief from 1944. As a novelist, she received many awards.

In 1986, she was with Zulfu Livaneli and Mikis Theodorakis among the founders of the Association for the Turkish-Greek Friendship (Daphne/Defne).

She died in Athens at age 95 from pneumonia.

The Dido Sotiriou Cultural Prize, issued by the Hellenic Authors' Society, is named after her.

Dido Sotiriou is a realistic writer who uses self biographical elements participating emotionally to the adventures of her protagonists. Her novels deal with the Asia Minor Catastrophe, the civil war period and the post-war period in Greece.

== Works ==
=== Prose ===
- The dead are waiting. Kedros, Athens, 1959.
- Elektra (Fictionalized biography of Elektra Apostolou). Athens, 1961.
- Bloody Earth. Kedros, Athens, 1962. ISBN 960-04-0083-0 (English edition: Farewell Anatolia. Kedros, Athens; 1996, ISBN 978-960-04-0479-1)
- Commandment. Kedros, Athens, 1976. ISBN 960-04-0005-9 (German edition: Das Gebot. Romiosini Verlag, Köln 1992, ISBN 3-923728-61-1)
- Through the flames. Kedros, Athens, 1978. ISBN 960-04-0146-2
- Guests. Kedros, Athens, 1979. ISBN 960-04-0124-1
- Shattered. Kedros, Athens, 1982. ISBN 960-04-0006-7
- Random encounter and other stories. Kedros, Athens, 2004. ISBN 960-04-2071-8
- Coincidence. Pyrsos, Athens, 1939.

=== Theater ===
- Two theatrical texts and a monologue. Kedros, Athens, 1995.
- Theatre. Kedros, Athens, 1995.

=== Non-fictional works ===
- The Asia Minor catastrophe and the strategy of imperialism in the Levant. Kedros, Athens, 1975 (essay). ISBN 960-04-0472-0

== See also ==
- Greek genocide

== Sources ==
- Geschichte einer Frau (Interview with Dido Sotiriou for the Greek edition of Magazine Marie Claire, Issue 6, May 1989), reprinted in: Niki Eideneier, Arzu Toker (Editors): Kalimerhaba (Greek-German-Turkish Reading Book). Romiosini, Köln 1992, ISBN 3-923728-53-0, pp. 579–588 (German issue) pp. 560–569 (Greek original text)
