= Grave monument from Kallithea =

Monumental grave reconstructed in Piraeus Museum

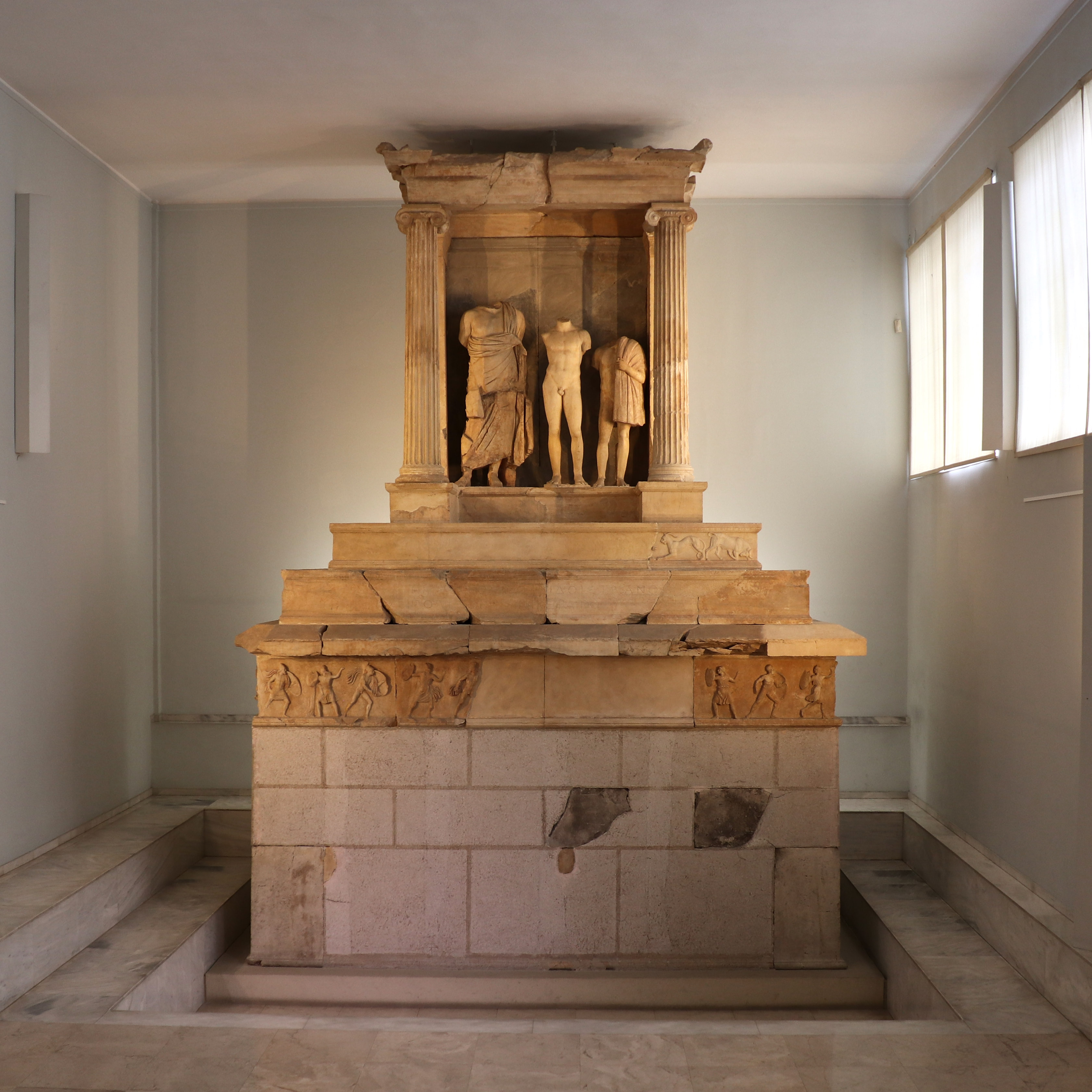
Funerary monument of Nikeratos and Polyxenos.

The Grave Monument from Kallithea is a tomb of a family of metics from Histria (Nikeratos and his son Polyxenos), which was excavated in Kallithea (Athens, Greece). The monument itself dates back to around 320 BCE and contains a polychrome frieze. It is currently located at the Piraeus Archaeological Museum. This grave monument was built outside the Long Walls leading to Piraeus.

== Description ==
The grave monument is composed of a limestone podium, which supports a marble pedestal with steps. On top of that, there are three statues inside an Ionic naiskos (a small temple). The three statues inside are of a family. The one on the far left is of Nikeratos, who wears a himation. The center statue is of his son, Polyxenos, who is depicted as a naked athlete in the contrapposto pose. The statue on the right is of one of the family's slave boys. The father and the slave boy are both in a static pose. All three have the softened musculature indicative of the Hellenistic period. The monument has noticeably aged. Limestone, a softer rock, has caused the podium to lose a few large chunks due to weathering. The marble pedestal has a few large cracks and a couple small missing pieces. The main frieze was done in relief. It depicts an Amazonomachy, where Greeks fought the tribe of warrior women. There is a blank area between two sections of the relief frieze, which may have been a painted frieze that has faded away with time. The naiskos is in a rather poor condition as all three statues inside have had their heads fall off.

=== Comparison to contemporaries ===
This grave monument is fairly reflective of others in the late 4th century BCE. It depicts conspicuous consumption, as only the wealthy could afford something this extravagant. In 317/316 BCE, grave monuments were banned under Demetrios of Phaleron's anti-luxury decree. Conspicuous monuments such as this one may have been the impetus behind the passage of the law.

== Gallery ==
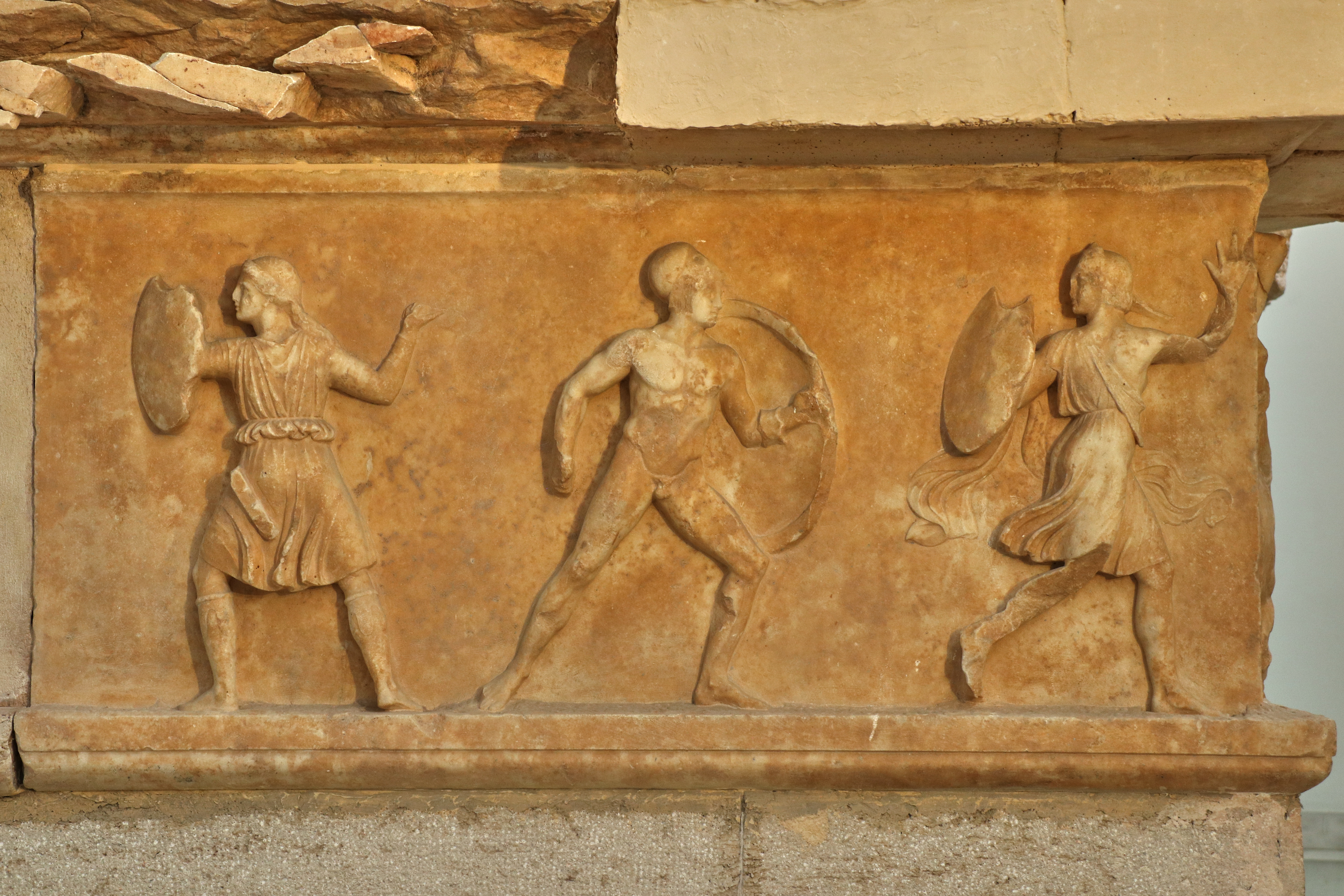

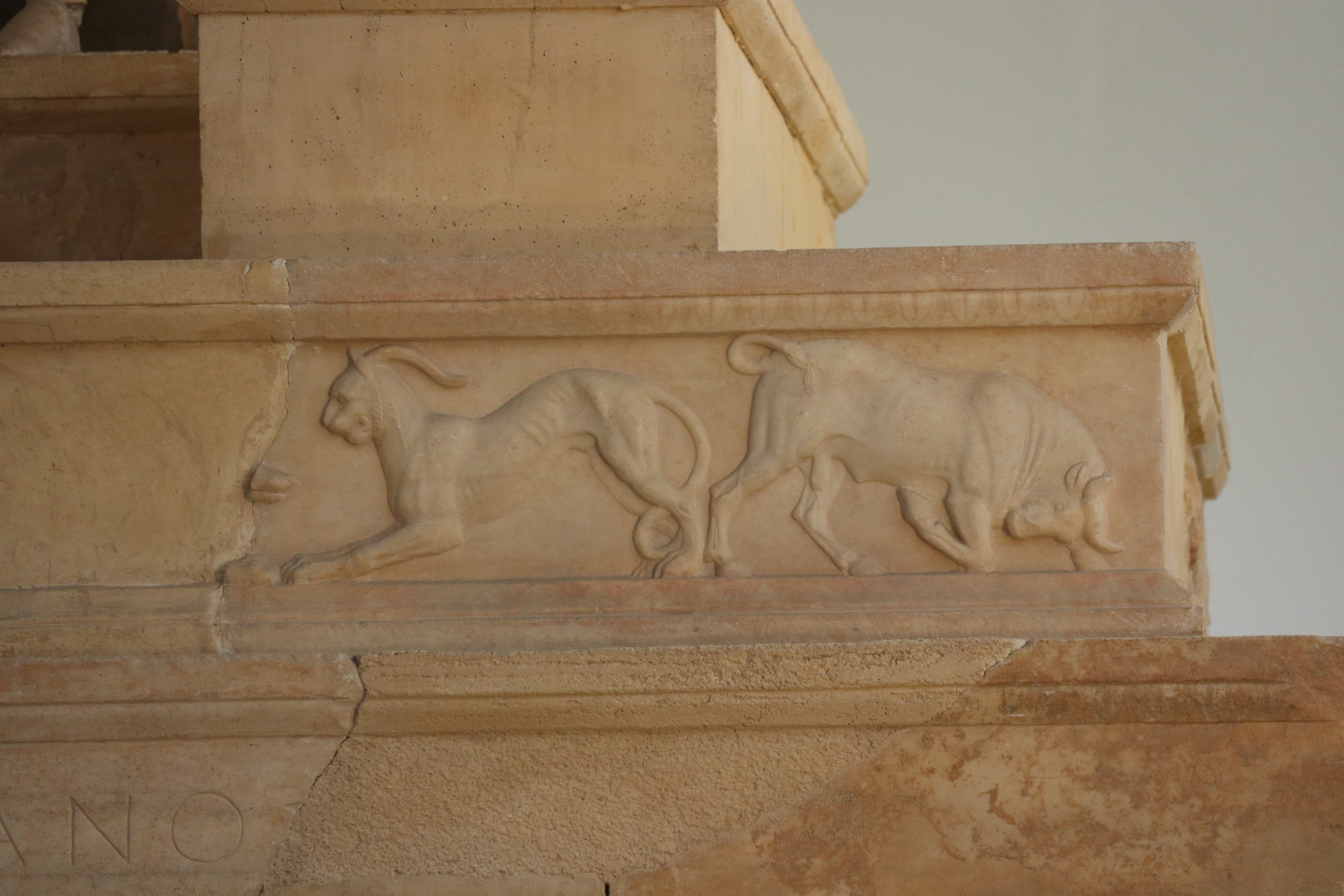
