= Phoebus Delivorias =

Phoebus Delivorias Φοίβος Δεληβοριάς
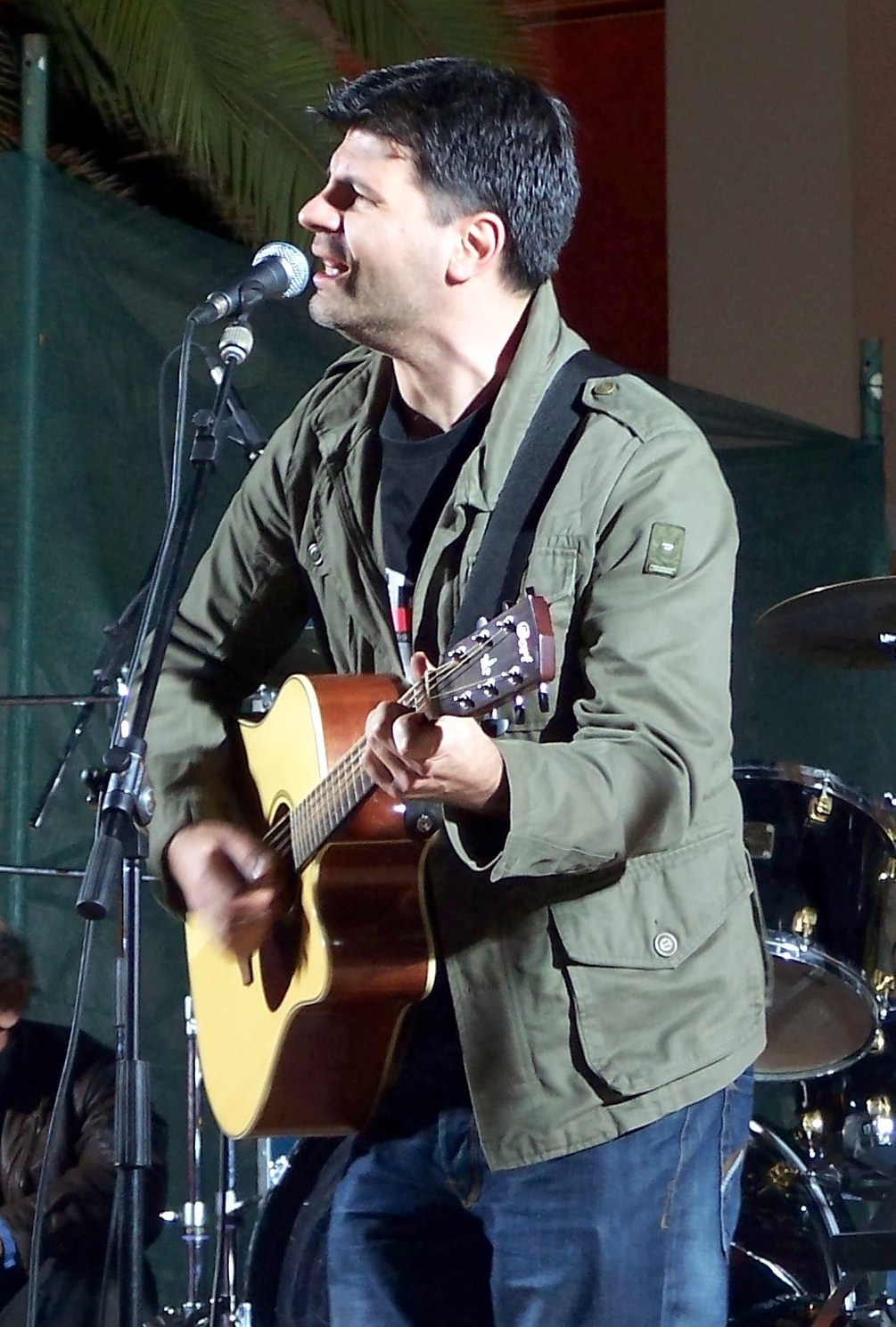
- Phoebus Delivorias

Background information
- Born: September 29, 1973 (age 52)
- Origin: Kallithea, Greece
- Genres: Rock
- Occupations: musician, singer, songwriter
- Instruments: guitar, singing
- Years active: 1988-present
- Website: http://www.foidel.gr/

Phoebus Delivorias (Greek: Φοίβος Δεληβοριάς, born 29 September 1973) is a Greek rock musician, singer, and songwriter from Kallithea, Attica.

== Career ==
In 1988, when he was only 15 years old, he took a cassette of his songs to Manos Xatzidakis resulting, one year later, in the release of his debut album "Η παρέλαση" in November 1989. His second disk was released, quite a few years after the first, in July 1995 and it was titled "Η ζωή μόνο ετσι ειν' ωραία". The same year he participated for the first time in a live music performance with Dionysis Savvopoulos. In 1998, his third album was released and it was titled "Χάλια". In the summer of 2003, his next album is released, the title of which is "Ο καθρέφτης". In 2007, his fifth studio album "Έξω" was released. Then, in 2008, he released a live album "Οι απίθανοι περιπέτειες". Two years later, he released his sixth studio album "Ο Αόρατος Άνθρωπος". His seventh album "Καλλιθέα" was released in November 2015. His first album with children's songs and eighth album overall, "Πες μου τ'όνομά σου", was released in 2018. His latest album "Anime" was released in 2022.

== Discography ==
Foivos Delivorias has released the following albums:

=== Studio albums ===
1989: Η Παρέλαση (The Parade)
1995: Η Ζωή Μόνο Έτσι Είν' Ωραία (Life's Only Good This Way)
1998: Χάλια (Mess)
2003: Ο καθρέφτης (The Mirror)
2007: Έξω (Outside)
2010: Ο Αόρατος Άνθρωπος (The Invisible Man)
2015: Καλλιθέα (Kallithea)
2018: Πες μου το όνομά σου (Tell me your name)
2022: Anime

=== Compilations ===
2008: Οι Απίθανες Περιπέτειες του Φοίβου Δεληβοριά #1 (The Incredible Adventures of Foivos Delivorias #1)

=== Other albums ===
2018: Η ταράτσα του Φοίβου (The Roof of Phoebus)
