= Kallithea =

Kallithea Καλλιθέα (Greek)
- Municipality
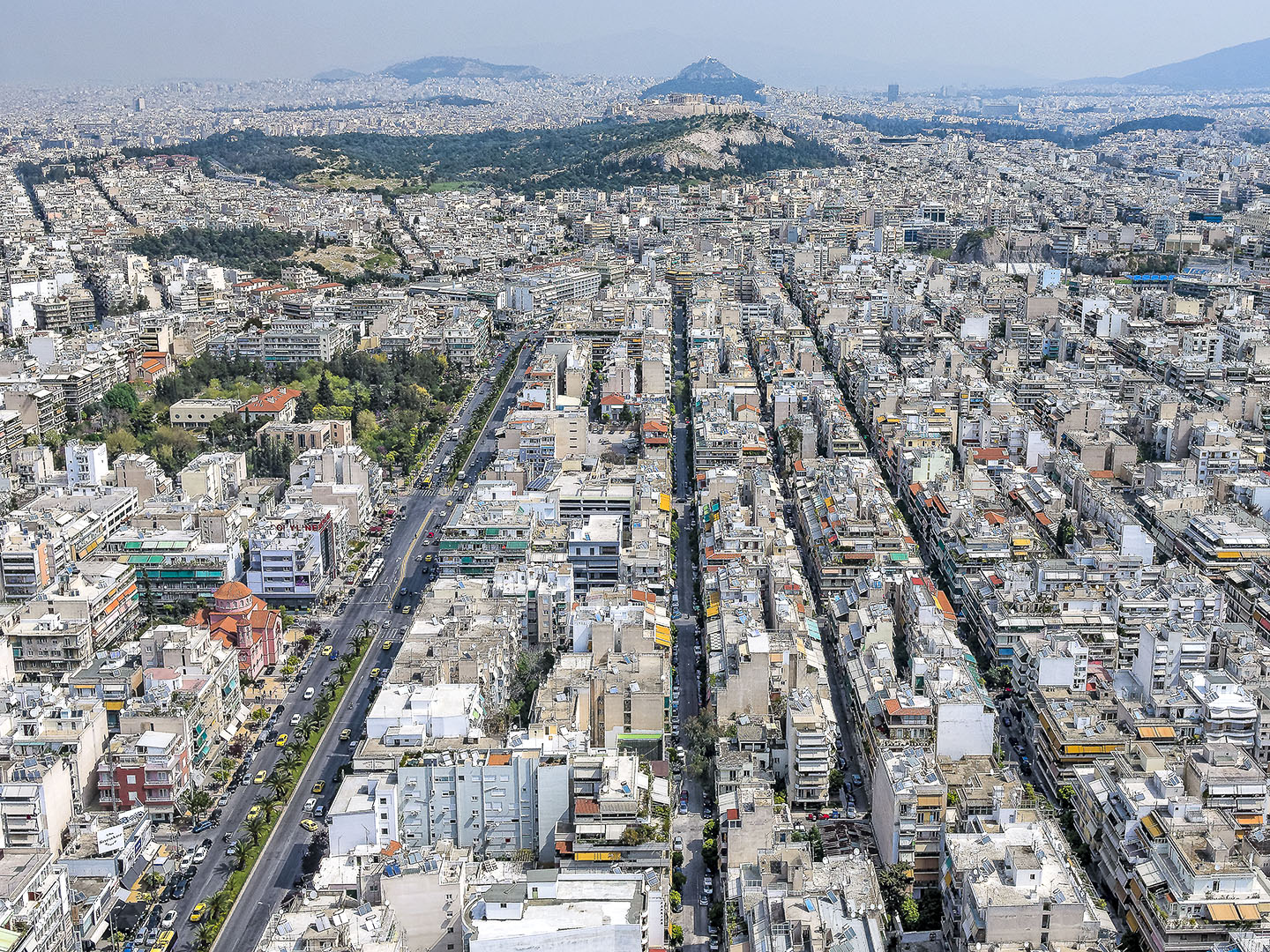
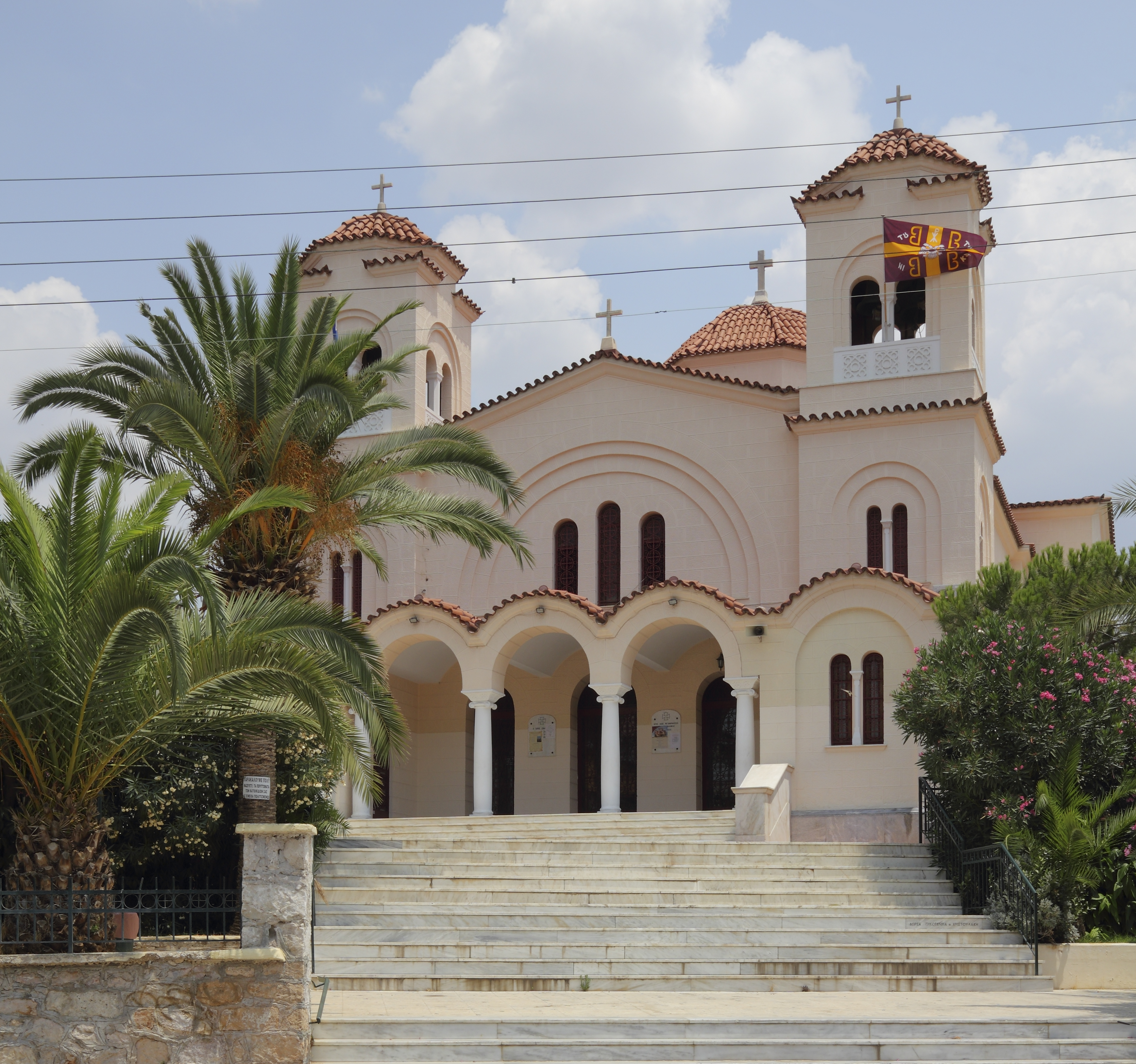
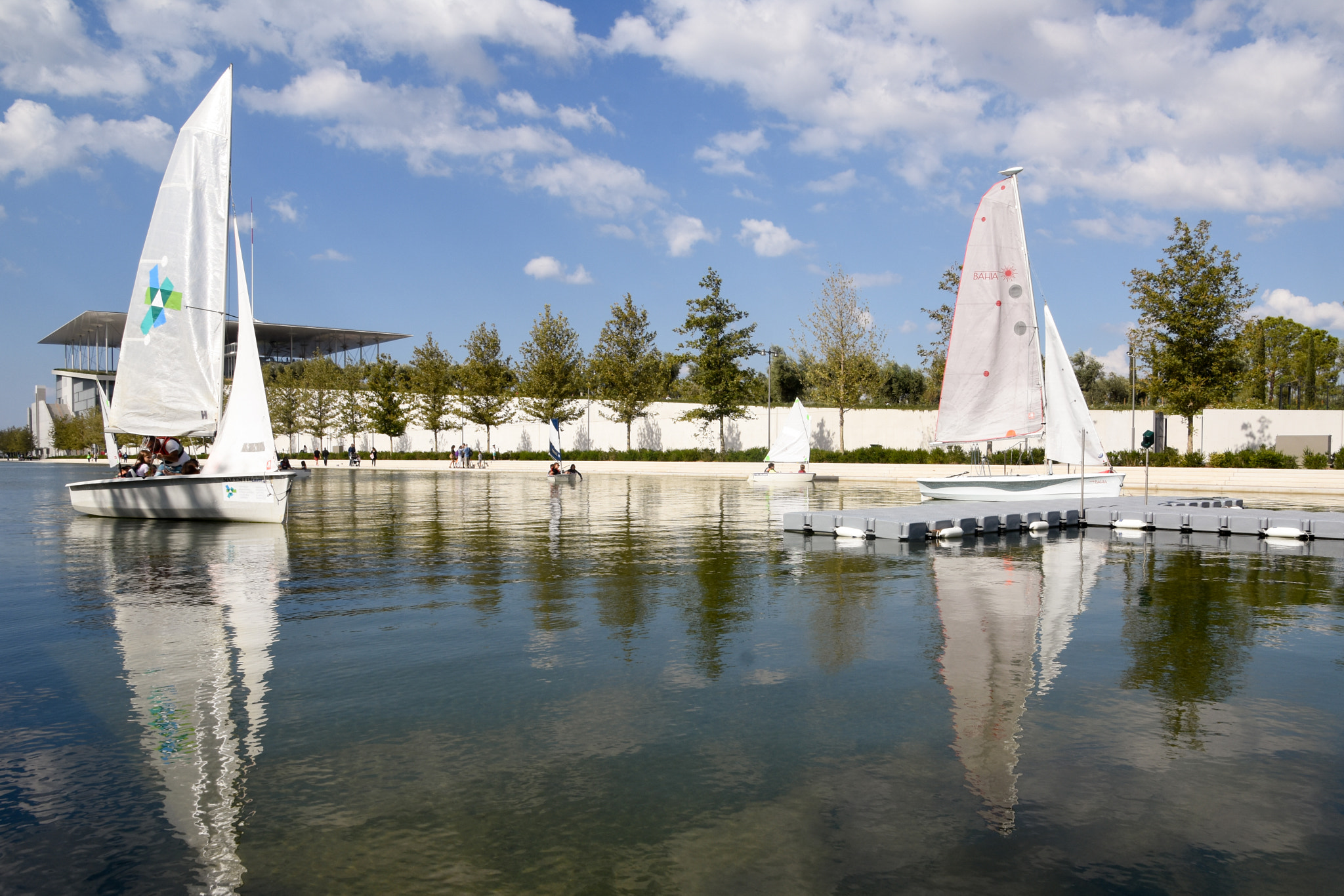
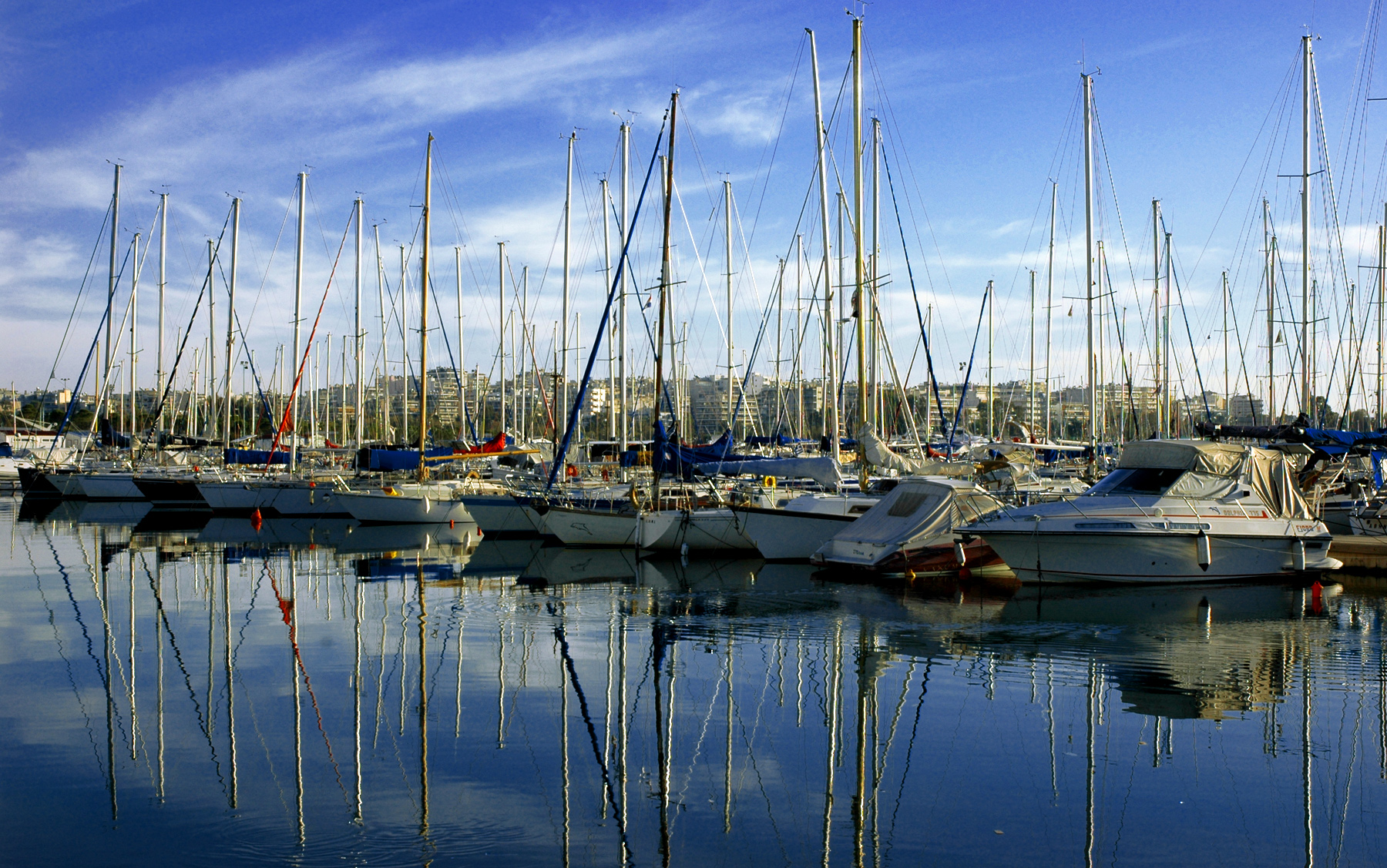
- Aerial view of the city with the Acropolis of Athens in the background Stavros Niarchos Foundation Cultural Center Church of Metamorphosis Sotiros Canal of Stavros Niarchos Park Marina Delta

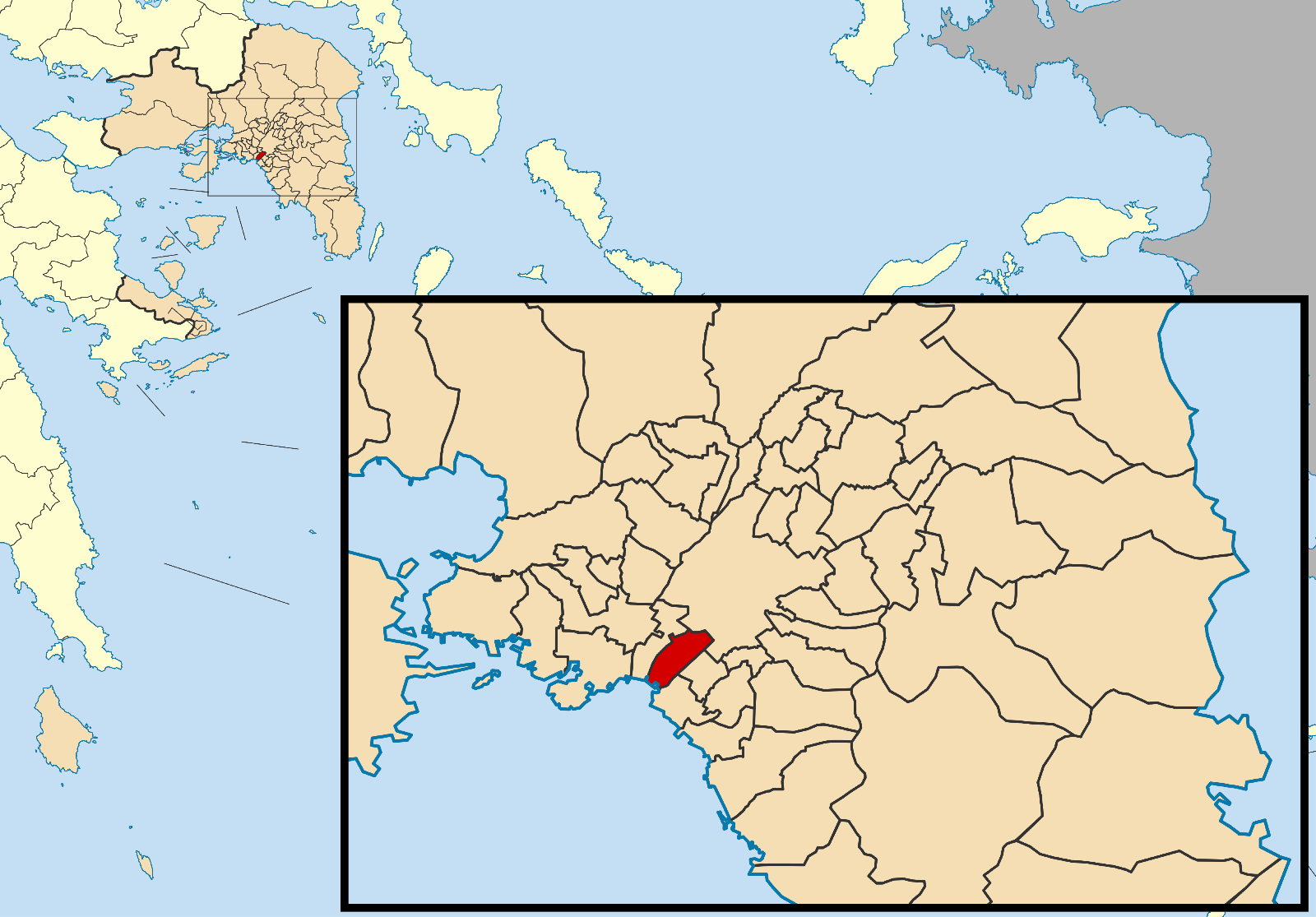

- Location within Greece
- Coordinates: 37°57′N 23°42′E
- Country: Greece
- Administrative region: Attica
- Regional unit: South Athens

Government
  - Mayor: Konstantinos Askounis (since 2023)

Area
  - Municipality: 4.749 km^{2} (1.834 sq mi)
- Elevation: 25 m (82 ft)

Population (2021)
  - Municipality: 97,616
  - Density: 20,560/km^{2} (53,240/sq mi)
- Time zone: UTC+2 (EET)
  - Summer (DST): UTC+3 (EEST)
- Postal code: 176 xx
- Area code: 210
- Vehicle registration: Z
- Website: www.kallithea.gr

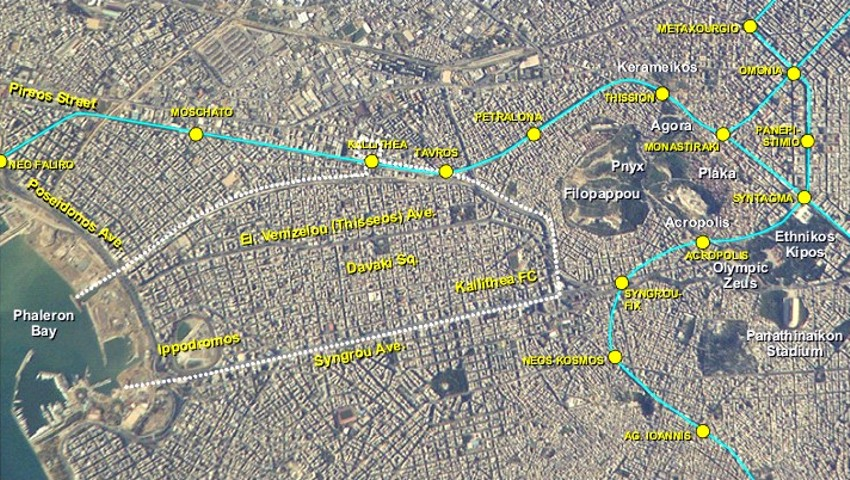
Space photo showing the municipality ofKallithea (bordered with white dotted line), its location next to the Athens centre (to the right) and the Phaleron Bay (to the left), as well as the local layout of the Athens Metro (cyan line) and its stations (yellow circles). Click box right to enlarge

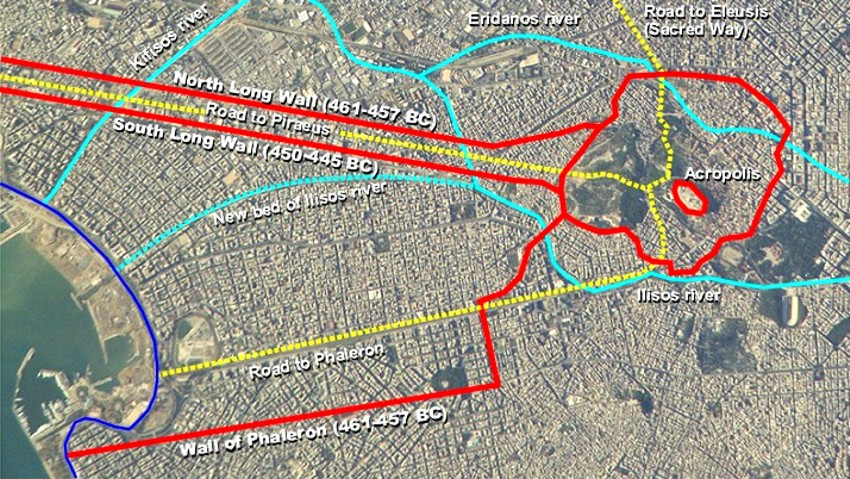
The fifth century BC fortification of Athens (red lines) superimposed on a recent astronaut photo. Also shown the river beds in ancient times (cyan lines), the new river bed (dotted cyan line), the ancient roads coinciding with existing ones (yellow dotted lines) and the Phaleron coastline at ancient times (blue line). Click box right to enlarge

Kallithea (Greek: Καλλιθέα, meaning "beautiful view") is a suburb in Athens agglomeration and a municipality in south Athens regional unit. It is the eighth largest municipality in Greece (97,616 inhabitants, 2021 census), as well as the fourth biggest in the Athens urban area (following municipalities of Athens, Piraeus, and Peristeri). Additionally, it is the 2nd most densely populated municipality in Greece and one of the most densely populated cities in the world, with 20,240/km^{2} (52,400/sq mi). The municipality has an area of 4.749 km^{2} (1.834 sq mi).

== Location ==
The center of Kallithea (Davaki Square) lies at a distance of 3 km (2 miles) to the south of the Athens city centre (Syntagma Square) and 3 km (2 mi) to the north-east of the Piraeus (photo 1). Kallithea extends from the Filopappou and Sikelia hills in the north to Phaleron Bay in the south; its two other sides consist of Syngrou Avenue to the east (border to the towns of Nea Smyrni and Palaio Faliro), and the Ilisos River to the west (border to the towns of Tavros and Moschato) (photo 2).

The site on which the city was developed covers the biggest part of the area to the south of Athens city centre, protected in ancient times (5th century BC) by the Long Walls to the west and the Phalerum Wall to the east (photo 3). Somewhere within this area the ancient town of Xypete lay. The town and its citizens are mentioned, among other places, in Plato's Dialogues.

== 1896 and 2004 Athens Olympics ==
The plans for the establishment of the new city of Kallithea were officially approved in December 1884. On the longitudinal axis of the town (Thiseos Avenue), the Athens to Phaleron tramway once ran, from the beginning (1850) to (1955) and the end of its operations. Near the centre of the town the Shooting Range (Skopeftirion) was built to house events of the first modern Olympic Games, the 1896 Summer Olympics, and these first modern games took place in three venues: the refurbished ancient stadium of Athens (Panathinaiko Stadium) 2 km (1 mi) NE of Kallithea, the Neo Phaliron Velodrome (currently Karaiskaki Stadium) 2 km (1 mi) SW of Kallithea, and the Kallithea Shooting Range (Skopeftirion).

Events of the Athens 2004 Olympic Games were also sited in the district of Kallithea, notably handball and Taekwondo in the new Sports Pavilion (Faliro) by the bottom of Syngrou Avenue, and beach volleyball in the Olympic Beach Volleyball Centre on Kallithea Bay (Tzitzifies).

== Growth ==
Between the first modern games (1896) and the 2004 Olympic Games in the city, Kallithea grew significantly. Initially, the tramway depot and workshop were built here in 1910, followed by the Harokopios Graduate School (1925) and the Panteios Graduate School of Political Sciences (1928).

In the 1920s the town was flooded by thousands of refugees following the Greek genocide, Greco-Turkish War (1919-1922), the Asia Minor Catastrophe (1922), and the Treaty of Lausanne (1923). These refugees arrived in Kallithea mainly from the south Black Sea (Pontus), from ancient Greek cities such as Sinope (now Sinop, Turkey), Sampsus (now Samsun, Turkey), Kerasus (now Giresun, Turkey), Trapezous-Trebizond (now Trabzon, Turkey), Tripolis (now Tirebolu, Turkey), Argyroupolis (now Gümüshane, Turkey) and other remnants of the late Byzantine Empire.

A few had arrived earlier (1919) from the north and east (Russian) coasts of the Black Sea, from places such as Odessos (Odesa), Marioupolis (Mariupol, the Sea of Azov) and elsewhere, after the failed attempt of the western allies (Greece included) against the young Bolshevik state during the Russian Civil War.

Black Sea immigrants of Greek origin also settled in Kallithea in the 1930s, as a result of the change of Soviet policy toward ethnic groups. Their origins were mainly in the east coast of the Black Sea (Batumi, Sukhumi, Novorossiysk, Anapa, etc.)

The first refugees settled originally near the site of the first Olympic shooting range (1896), until they were gradually transferred to new dwellings. After its evacuation the building bound with the shooting range served as a school, until the Nazi Occupation of 1941, when it was converted to a prison. The prison of Kallithea was demolished in 1966; among others, fighters of the Greek Resistance and victims of the Greek Civil War had been jailed there, such as Nikos Beloyannis.

In the 1990s, after the dissolution of the Soviet Union, a new wave of Greek immigrants arrived in Kallithea from the east coast of the Black Sea, from the Caucasus highlands in Georgia, as well as from distant Greek settlements in Kazakhstan and Uzbekistan where their Black Sea Greek ancestors were expelled during Joseph Stalin's regime in the 1930s.

=== Historical population ===
Year	Population
1981	117,319
1991	114,233
2001	109,609
2011	100,641
2021	97,616

== Climate ==
Kallithea has a hot semi-arid climate (BSh) bordering a hot-summer Mediterranean climate (Csa in the Köppen climate classification). It has very hot dry summers and mild winters. During the summer of 2024 the National Observatory of Athens station in Harokopio University reached a stunning summer mean maximum temperature of 36.8 °C (98.2 °F).

Climate data for Harokopio University
Month	Jan	Feb	Mar	Apr	May	Jun	Jul	Aug	Sep	Oct	Nov	Dec	Year
Record high °C (°F)	22.8 (73.0)	21.9 (71.4)	26.1 (79.0)	31.6 (88.9)	36.9 (98.4)	41.4 (106.5)	43.4 (110.1)	43.3 (109.9)	37.3 (99.1)	32.1 (89.8)	28.0 (82.4)	22.1 (71.8)	43.4 (110.1)
Mean daily maximum °C (°F)	14.4 (57.9)	15.6 (60.1)	18.4 (65.1)	22.3 (72.1)	26.9 (80.4)	32.4 (90.3)	35.9 (96.6)	35.1 (95.2)	30.4 (86.7)	25.3 (77.5)	20.3 (68.5)	16.0 (60.8)	24.4 (75.9)
Daily mean °C (°F)	10.6 (51.1)	11.6 (52.9)	13.9 (57.0)	17.4 (63.3)	21.9 (71.4)	27.1 (80.8)	30.5 (86.9)	30.1 (86.2)	25.6 (78.1)	20.7 (69.3)	16.2 (61.2)	12.4 (54.3)	19.8 (67.7)
Mean daily minimum °C (°F)	6.7 (44.1)	7.6 (45.7)	9.5 (49.1)	12.5 (54.5)	16.8 (62.2)	21.8 (71.2)	25.1 (77.2)	25.0 (77.0)	20.8 (69.4)	16.1 (61.0)	12.2 (54.0)	8.8 (47.8)	15.2 (59.4)
Record low °C (°F)	−1.6 (29.1)	−0.4 (31.3)	−0.2 (31.6)	5.5 (41.9)	11.7 (53.1)	14.2 (57.6)	18.3 (64.9)	19.2 (66.6)	12.8 (55.0)	9.1 (48.4)	4.4 (39.9)	0.8 (33.4)	−1.6 (29.1)
Average rainfall mm (inches)	52.2 (2.06)	34.4 (1.35)	28.1 (1.11)	19.6 (0.77)	19.2 (0.76)	26.7 (1.05)	8.9 (0.35)	13.1 (0.52)	23.1 (0.91)	27.4 (1.08)	62.0 (2.44)	63.2 (2.49)	377.9 (14.89)
Source 1: National Observatory of Athens Monthly Bulletins (Nov 2016 - Aug 2025)
Source 2: Harokopio Athens N.O.A station and World Meteorological Organization

== Culture ==
Kallithea's main cultural centre is the Stavros Niarchos Foundation Cultural Center. South Kallithea (Tzitzifies), is associated with the development of Greek folk music, particularly rebetiko and later laïkó. Popular composers and singers once performed here; Markos Vamvakaris, Vassilis Tsitsanis, Yannis Papaioannou, Marika Ninou, Sotiria Bellou, Manolis Chiotis, Mary Linda, Giorgos Zampetas, Stelios Kazantzidis, Marinella, Poly Panou, and Viki Moscholiou.

=== Education ===
Kallithea houses two universities (Harokopio University and Panteion University). An even more notable school in Kallithea is Sivitanidios School, one of the oldest technical school in Greece.

=== Sports ===
Until 2004, south Kallithea (Tzitzifies) housed the only horse track in Greece (Ippodromos - Hippodrome), which later moved to Markopoulon, near Eleftherios Venizelos Airport. Kallithea houses numerous cultural associations and several sport clubs, the most well-known of which are Athens Kallithea F.C. (soccer), Esperos (basketball, volleyball, handball, and also soccer in an earlier period) and Ikaros Kallitheas, a multisport club founded in 1991, originally as Ikaros Nea Smyrni. Kallithea had another important club, Esperides Kallithea, with many titles in women basketball. This club merged to Ikaros Kallithea in 2012.

Active sport clubs based in Kallithea
Club	Founded	Sports	Achievements
Esperos Kallitheas	1943	Basketball, Volleyball	Earlier presence in A1 Ethniki basketball
Athens Kallithea F.C.	1966	Football	Earlier presence in A Ethniki
Ikaros Kallitheas	1991	Basketball	Earlier presence in A1 Ethniki basketball

== Transportation ==
The main roads of Kallithea are Andrea Syngrou Avenue towards eastern Athens and Poseidonos Avenue towards Piraeus and the other southern suburbs. Kallithea is served by metro line 1 stations Kallithea and Tavros, by the tram stations Kallithea and Tzitzifies, and numerous bus and trolley-bus lines connect Kallithea to almost every destination in metropolitan Athens.

== Sites of interest ==
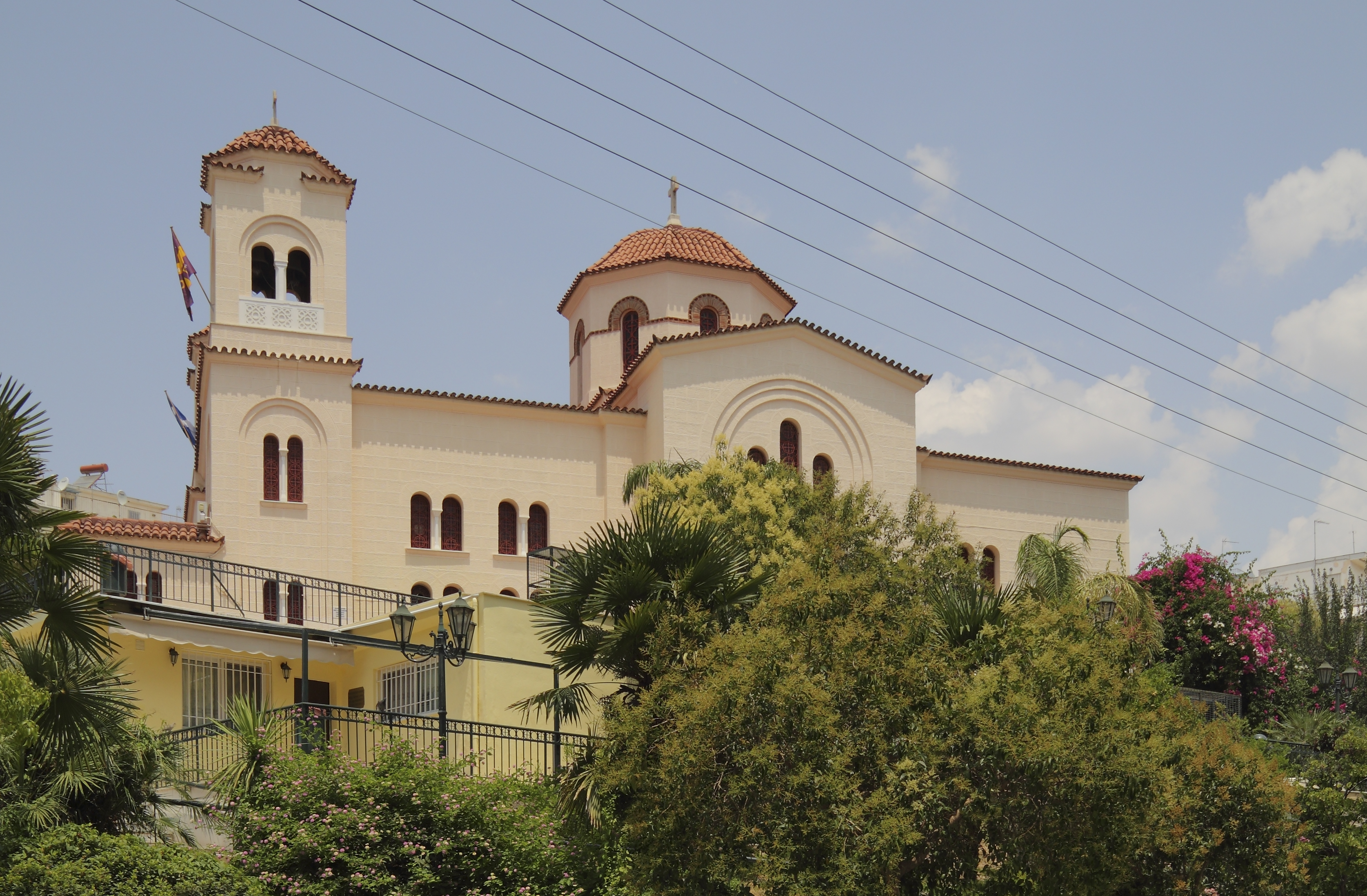
The church Metamorphosi Sotiros

- Harokopio University
- Panteion University
- Municipal Gallery, housed in the Laskaridou building, one of the first dwellings in the city.
- Aghia Eleousa church of the late Byzantine period.
- Kallithea monument, a fourth-century BC family tomb, one of the most impressive exhibits of the Piraeus Archaeological Museum.
- "Argonauts-Comnenus" (Argonaftes-Komnini) fraternity of the Pontus Greeks, aiming at the study and preservation of the history and traditions of their fatherlands.
- "Constantinopolitan Society" (Syllogos Konstantinoupoliton) of the Constantinople Greeks that settled in Kallithea forced to abandon Istanbul during the Greek Genocide and after the Greco-Turkish War (1919-1922) as well as after the Varlik Vergisi, the Istanbul Pogrom and generally in subsequent deteriorations of Greco-Turkish relations.
- Monument in memory of the Pontus Greeks in the center of the city (Davaki Square and Gardens).
- Faliro Coastal Zone Olympic Complex on Kallithea beach from the Sports Pavilion (Faliro) to the Olympic Beach Volleyball Center and the delta of the River Ilisos.
- Grigoris Lambrakis Stadium, home to Kallithea FC since 1972.

== Emblem ==
The emblem of the Kallithea municipality is Theseus. According to the Greek Mythology, Theseus landed on the shores of Kallithea after returning from Crete, where he had killed the Minotaur.

== Notable people ==
- Demis Anastasiadis, singer and songwriter
- Foivos Delivorias, singer and songwriter
- Eleni Foureira, singer, actress, dancer, and fashion designer
- Stamatis Kraounakis, composer

== Gallery ==
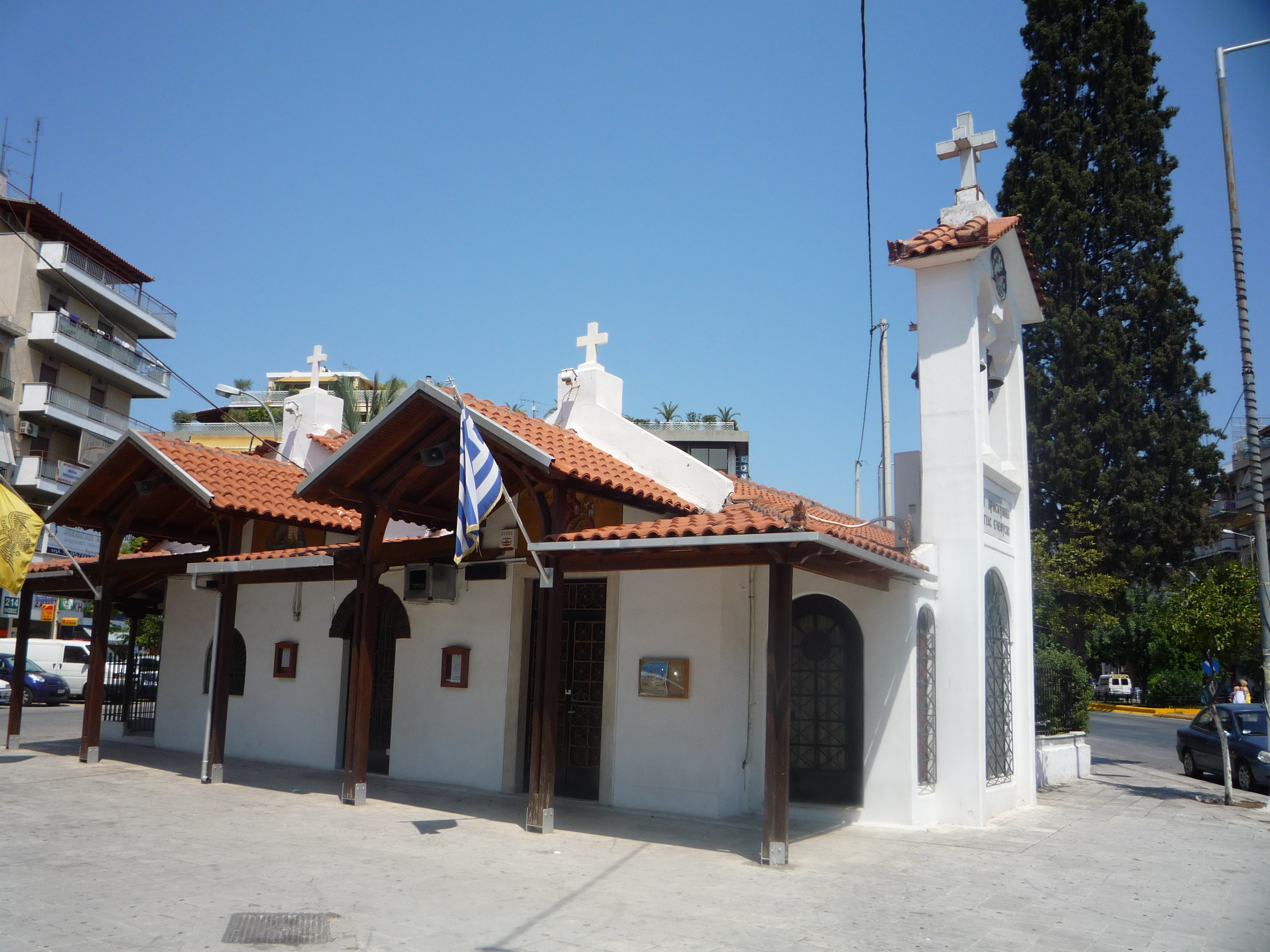
The church Agia Eleousa (Thisseos Avenue)

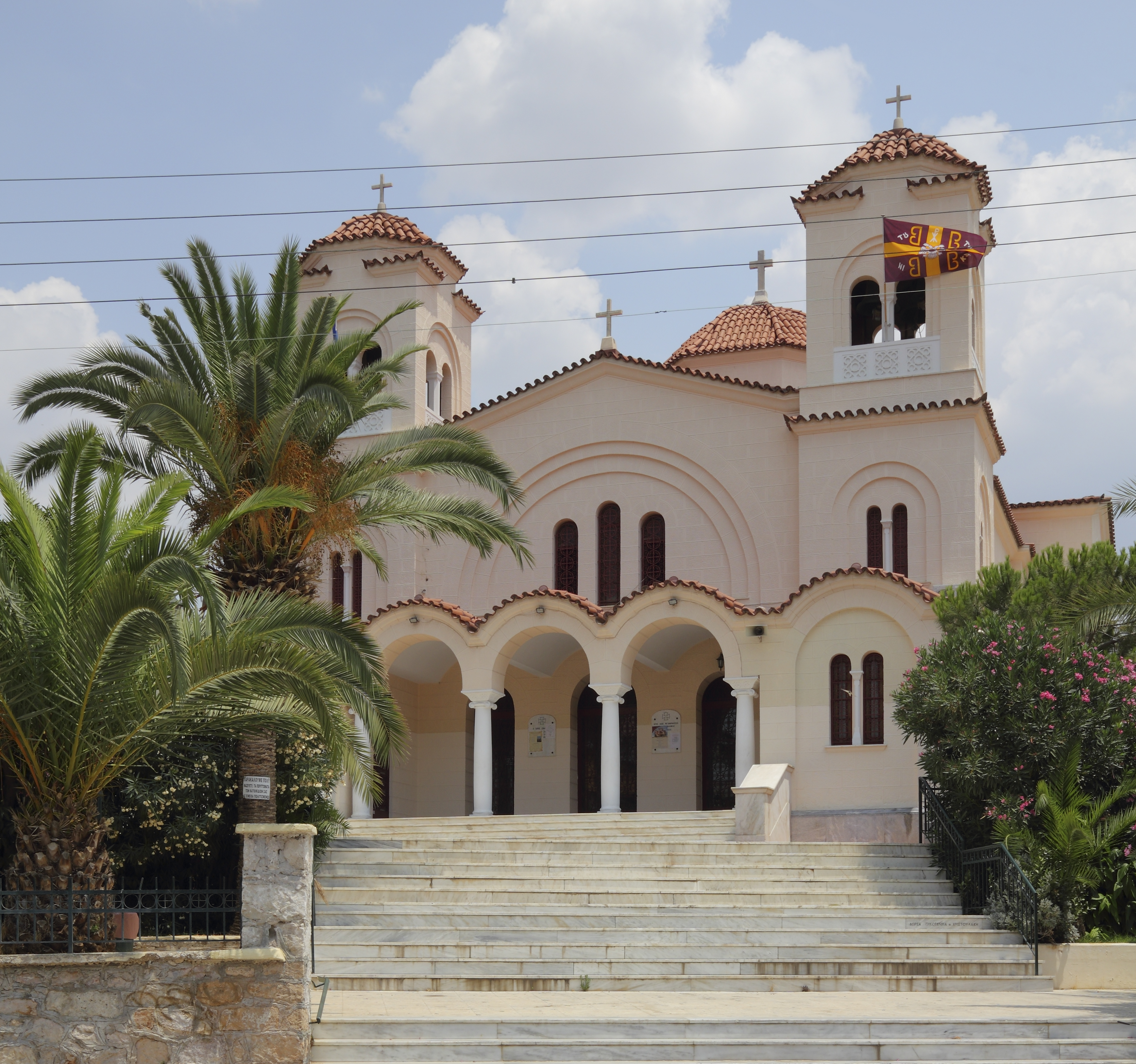
The church Metamorphosi Sotiros

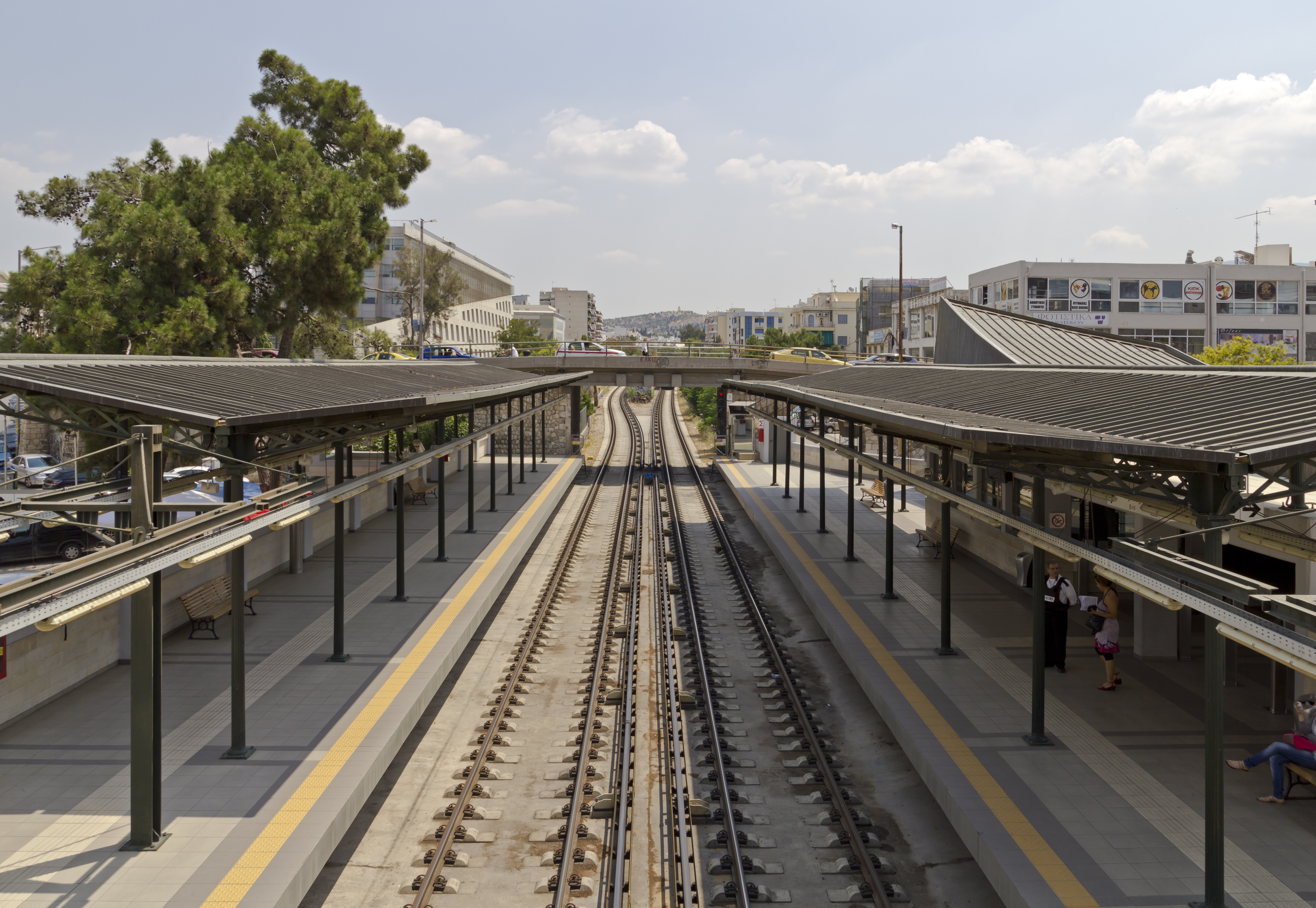
Kallithea Metro station

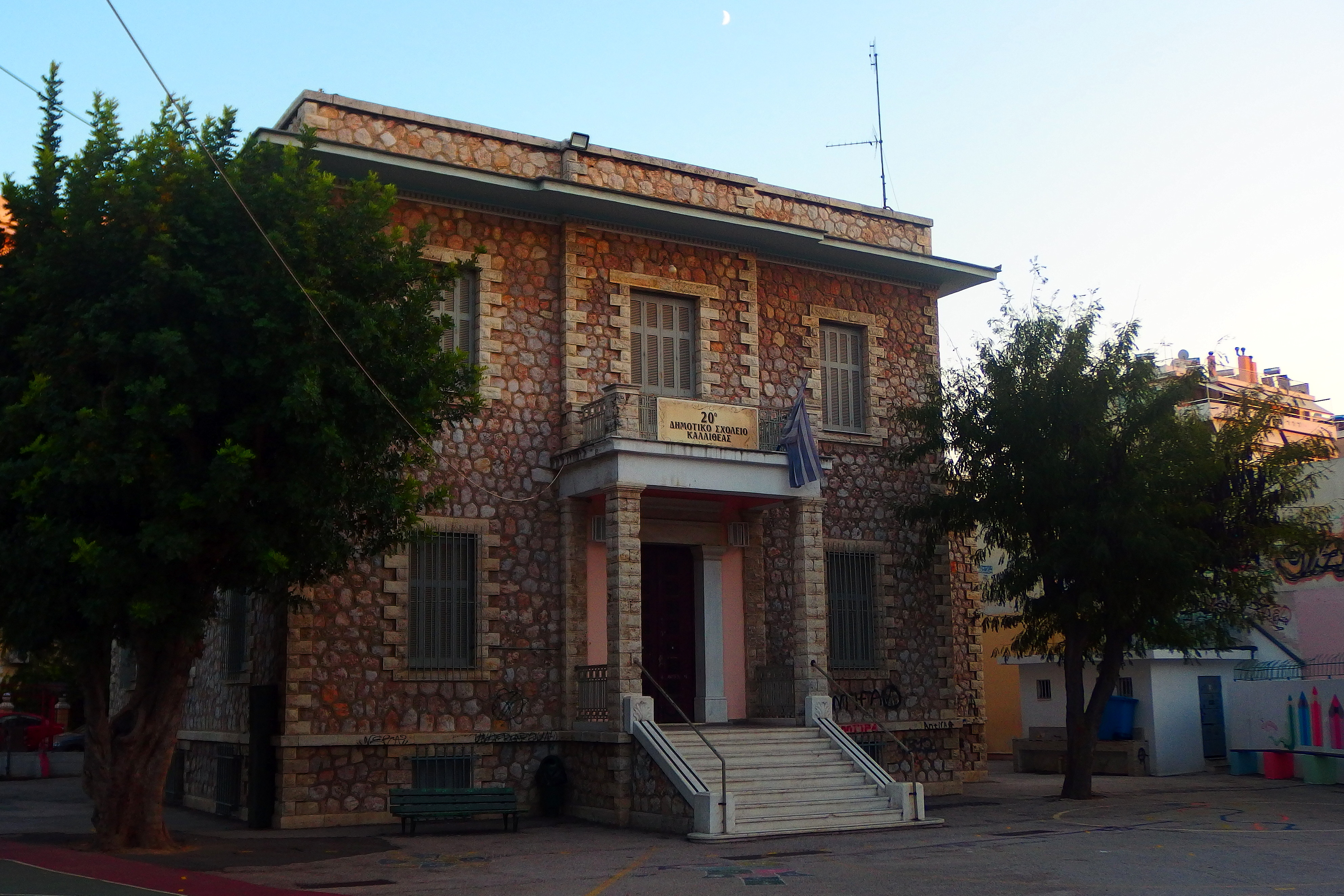
The building of the 20th Primary School of Kallithea

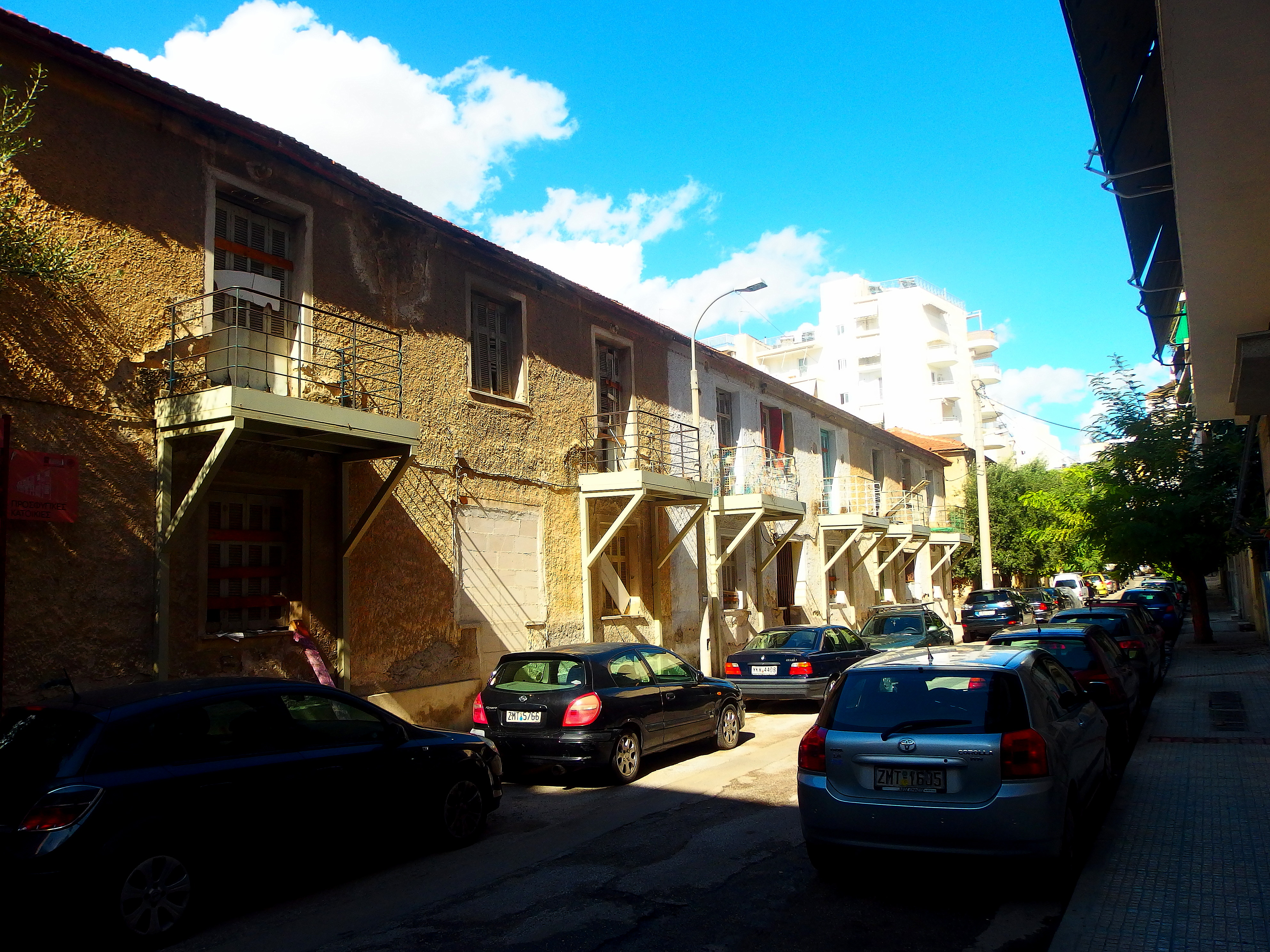
Old refugees' houses in Kallithea

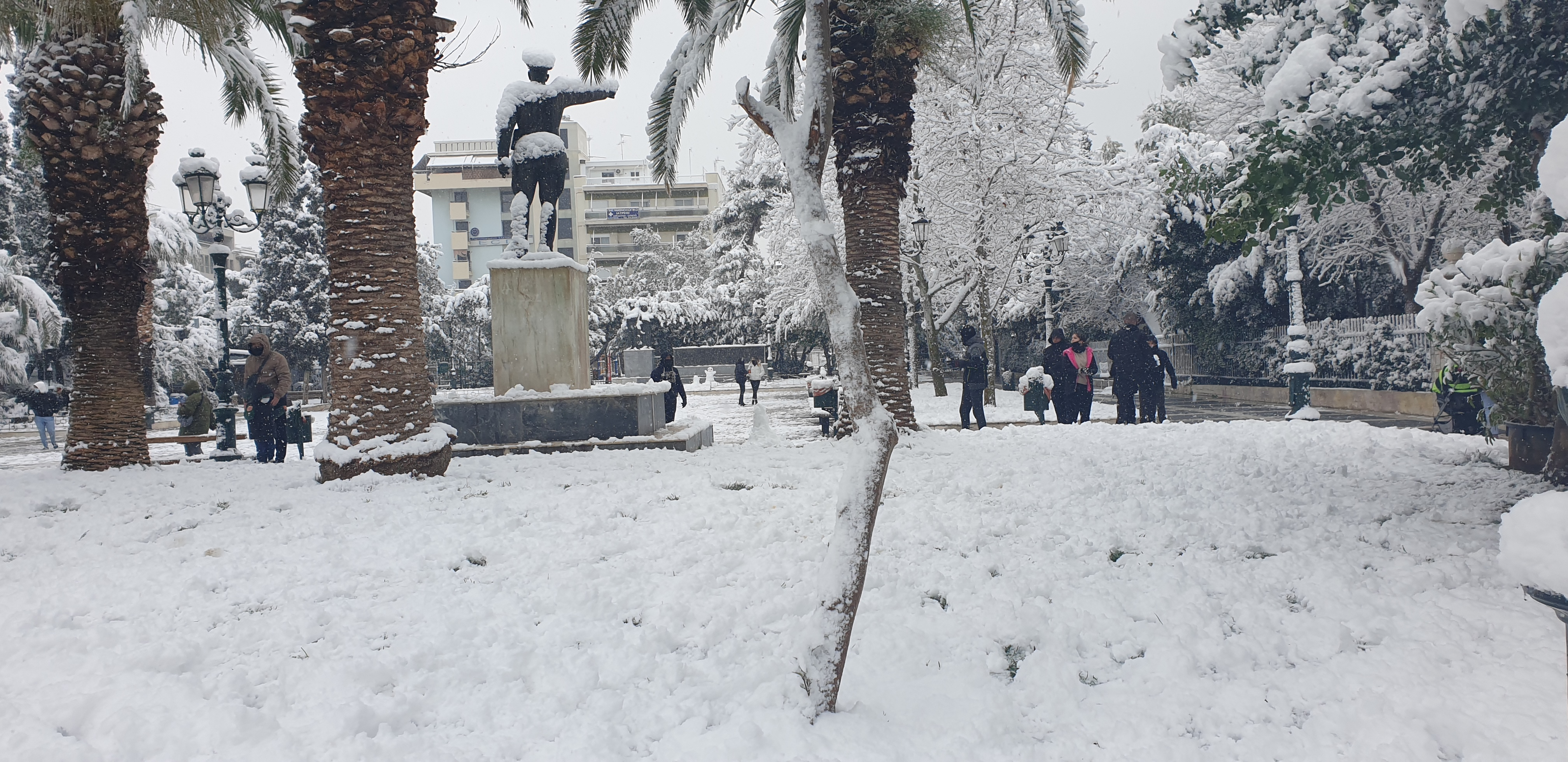
Snow in Davaki Square

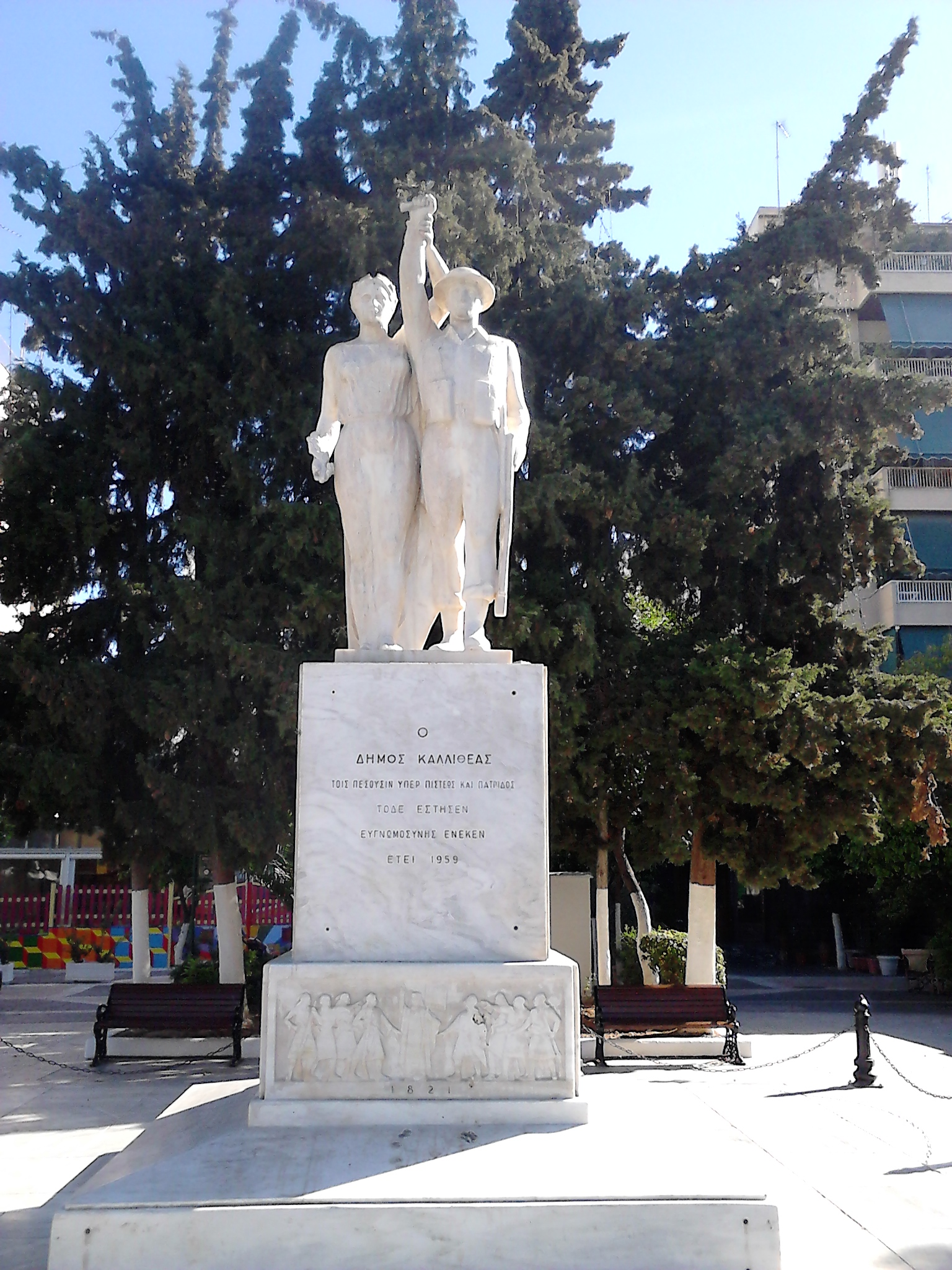
One of the Kallithea War Memorial

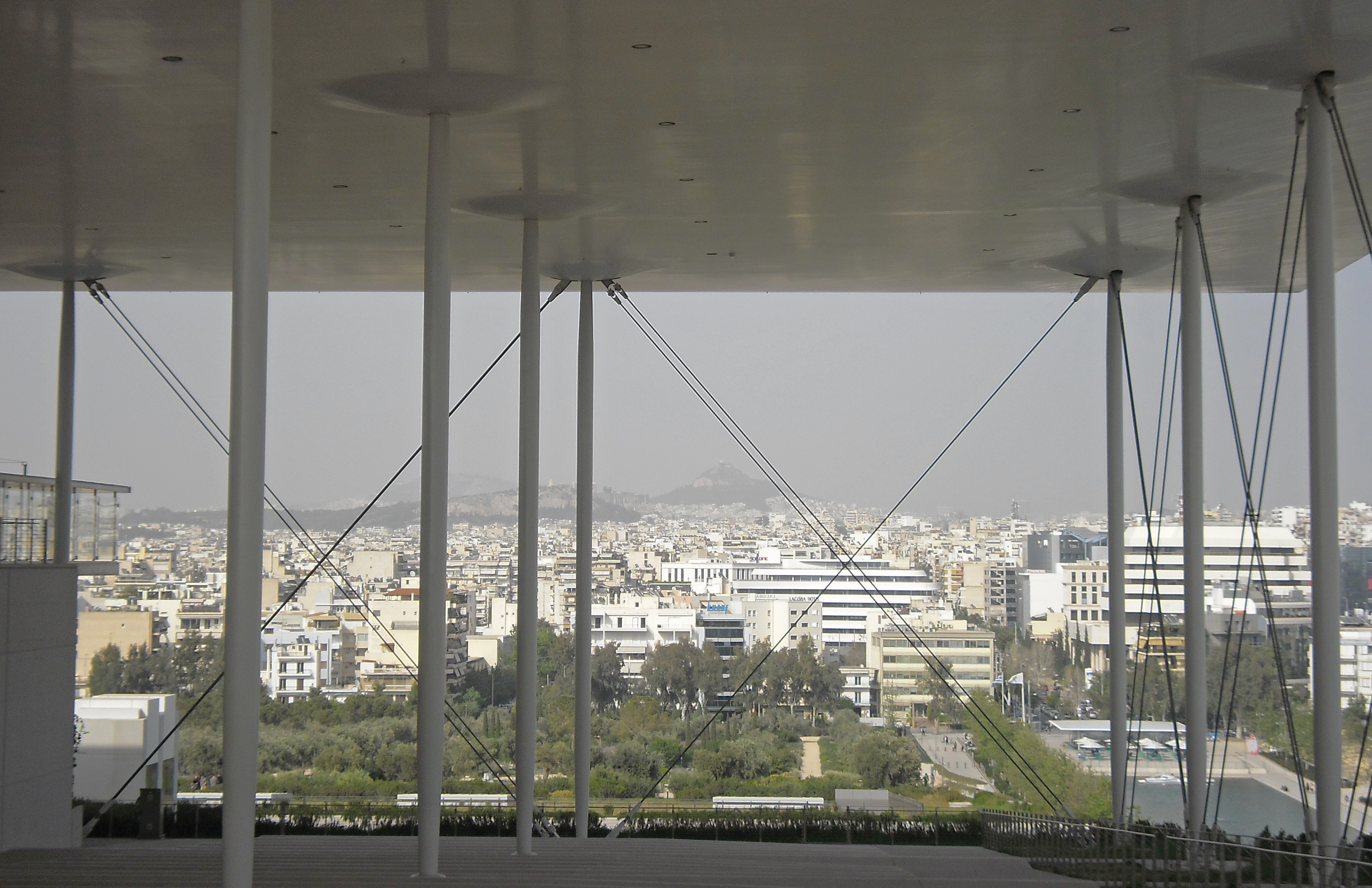
View of the city from Stavros Niarchos Foundation Center

== See also ==
- List of cities in Greece
