= Nikos Beloyannis =

Greek resistance leader during World War II; leading cadre of the Greek Communist Party

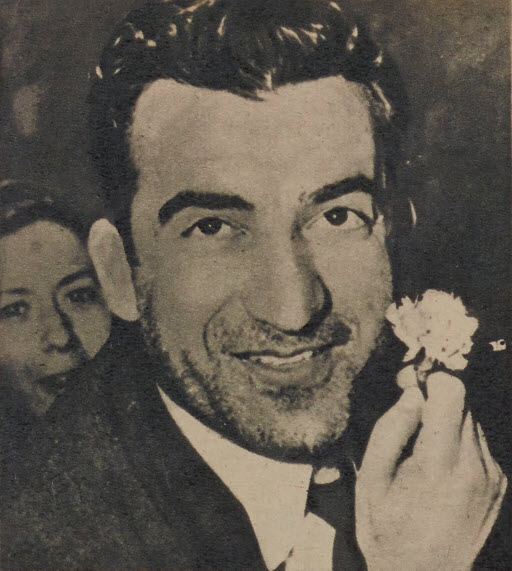

Personal details
- Born: 22 December 1915 Amaliada, Greece
- Died: 30 March 1952 (aged 36) Goudi, Athens, Greece
- Party: Communist Party of Greece
- Domestic partner: Elli Pappa
- Occupation: Politician, political commissar

Military service
- Branch/service: Democratic Army of Greece; Greek People's Liberation Army
- Years of service: 1946-1949 (Democratic Army of Greece); 1943-1945 (Greek People's Liberation Army)
- Rank: Political commissar
- Unit: 10th Division (Democratic Army of Greece); 9th Regiment (Greek People's Liberation Army)
- Battles/wars: Greek Civil War; World War II; Greek Resistance

Nikos Beloyannis (Greek: Νίκος Μπελογιάννης; 1915 – 30 March 1952) was a Greek resistance leader and leading member of the Greek Communist Party.

== Biography ==
Beloyannis was born in Amaliada (Peloponnese, Greece) in 1915. He came from a relatively prosperous family and went on to study law in Athens, but before being able to graduate, he was arrested and jailed in an Akronauplia prison by the Ioannis Metaxas regime in the 1930s. He was transferred to the Germans after the Axis occupation of Greece in 1941. He escaped in 1943 and joined the Greek People's Liberation Army (ELAS) in Peloponnese on the side of Aris Velouchiotis. After becoming Political Commissioner of the Democratic Army of Greece (DSE) during the Greek Civil War, he was one of the last to leave the country after its defeat in 1949.

In June 1950, Beloyannis returned to Greece in order to re-establish the Communist Party of Greece (KKE) in Athens, which had been declared illegal. He was arrested on 20 December 1950 and court-martialed on charges of violating Compulsory Law 509/1947, which criminalized the KKE. He was accused of treason, allegedly having transmitted information to the Soviet Union. The Beloyannis trial started in Athens on 19 October 1951. In total, 94 people were accused. One of the three members of the court-martial was Georgios Papadopoulos who later became the leader of the military dictatorship of 1967-1974. Beloyannis denied all accusations and stressed the patriotic nature of his actions during the anti-Nazi resistance, the British intervention, and the Greek Civil War. He became globally known as the "Man with the Carnation" and as such, he was depicted in a famous Pablo Picasso sketch. Beloyannis defended the achievements of the resistance and exposed that people who had fought the Nazis were persecuted for their left-wing views, while Nazi collaborators were rewarded with posts in the Greek government in the onset of the Cold War.

Despite national and international appeals for clemency, between 15 and 16 November, the court-martial sentenced Beloyannis and eleven of his comrades to death. On 1 March 1952, Beloyannis and seven others were sentenced. Within a week, the Greek government received hundreds of thousands of international telegrams protesting the death sentence, while an international campaign—with the participation of personalities like Picasso, Charlie Chaplin, Jean Paul Sartre, Paul Éluard, Nazim Hikmet and others—asked for the cancellation of the military tribune's verdict. Four prisoners, including Beloyannis, were taken from Kallithea on the early morning of Sunday, 30 March 1952, and executed in the Goudi camp. The sentences of the other prisoners were commuted to life imprisonment, and by the mid-1960s, all were released from prison.

Beloyannis was one of the most prominent of the Greeks who collaborated with the Soviet Union after World War II. His name was given to the village of Beloiannisz, Hungary, which housed Greek left-wing refugees that fled Greece at the end of the civil war until they were allowed to return to Greece by the first Andreas Papandreou government in the early 1980s.

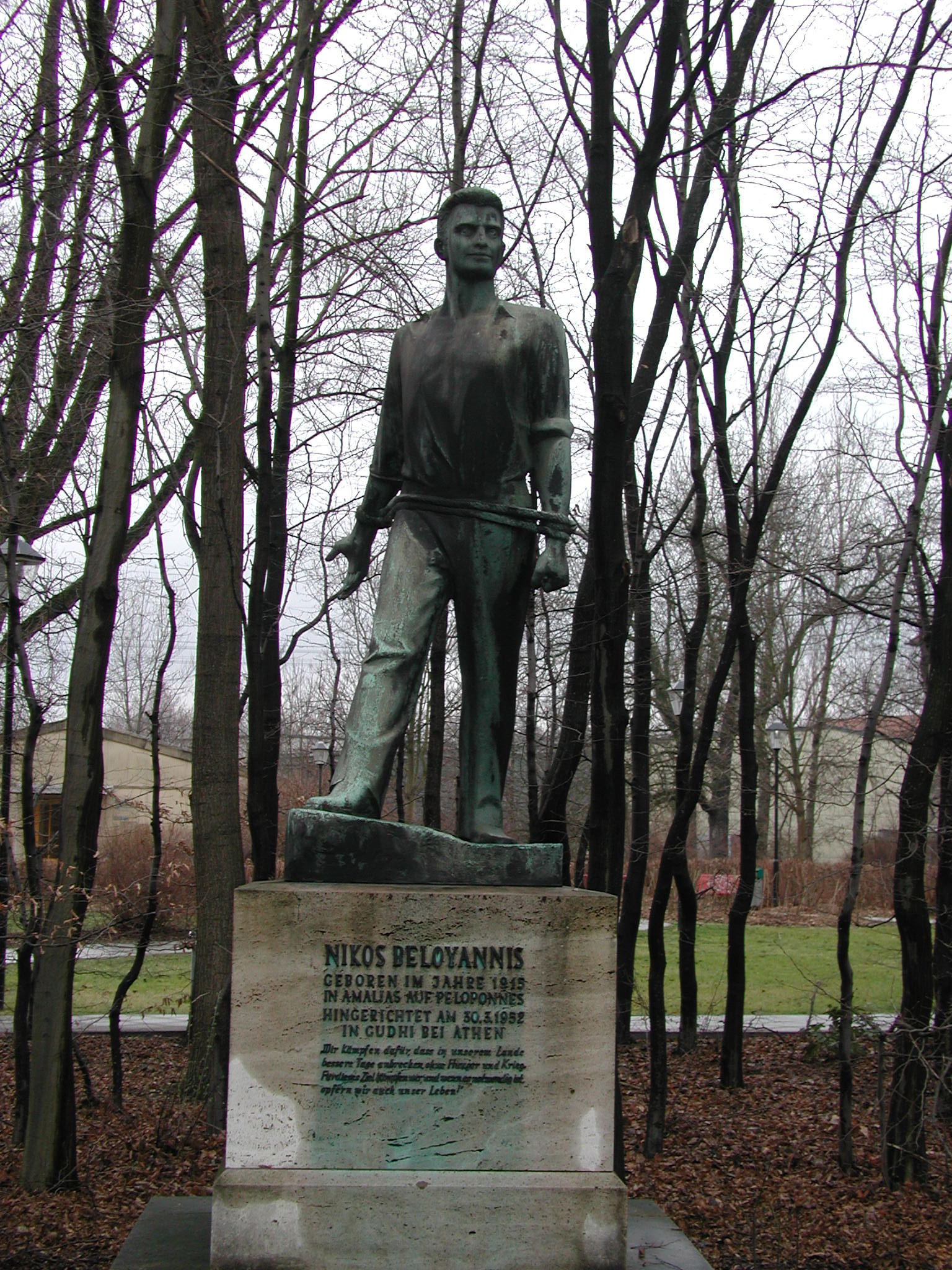
A monument of Nikos Beloyannis in former Communist East Berlin.

== Writings ==
In his last letter, written from death-row, Beloyannis mentions two books that he appears to have written on the economic development of Greece and the country's history of literature. The manuscripts of the former were published in 2010 under the title Foreign Capital in Greece (Το Ξένο Κεφάλαιο στην Ελλάδα, To Kseno Kefaleo stin Ellada). Through the detailed analysis of Greece's external borrowing, its history is presented as one of subjection to foreign powers and financial institutions who ended up controlling most of its economy and resources to the dismay of the working class.

== Cultural references ==
- Pablo Picasso created a sketch named The Man with the Carnation honouring Beloyannis, inspired by a portrait of him.
- Peter de Francia painted The Execution of Beloyannis in 1953. It was sold to a private collector in 2011 by James Hyman Gallery It has since become part of the Tate collection.
- Nikos Tzimas' movie The Man with the Carnation (1980) dramatises the arrest, trial, and execution of Beloyannis.
- Turkish poet Nâzım Hikmet wrote a poem called The Man with the Carnation in 1952 about Beloyannis.

== See also ==
- Elli Pappa (1920–2009), Greek writer and activist, partner of Nikos Beloyannis
- Beloiannisz, a village in Hungary named after him
