= Farewell Anatolia =

1962 novel by Dido Sotiriou

- Author: Dido Sotiriou
- Original title: Ματωμένα χώματα
- Language: Greek
- Genre: Historical fiction
- Publication date: 1962
- Media type: Print
- ISBN: 978-9600404791

Farewell Anatolia (Greek: Ματωμένα χώματα, romanized: Matomena chomata, lit. 'Blood-stained lands') is one of the best-known novels of Dido Sotiriou. It is a historical fiction book set during World War I and the subsequent Greco-Turkish War. It was first published in Athens in 1962 and has been translated into several languages, including English, Bulgarian, French, Turkish, Spanish and German.

== Plot ==
The story follows Manolis Axiotis, a Greek peasant living in a village in Anatolia where Turks, Greeks and Armenians coexisted peacefully in the years prior to World War I. With Ottoman Empire's entry to the war, the protagonist is taken prisoner into the forced labour battalions Amele Taburları. After surviving the hardships of the forced labour camps and returning to his village, the Greco-Turkish War starts and with the arrival of Greek troops to Anatolia, joins the Greek army. As the Greek troops advance, Manolis perceives the senselessness of war, and its extreme violence. After the initial advance, he witnesses the collapse of the Greek front and the chaotic retreat of the army as well as the massacres of the Greek and Armenian population, culminating with the destruction of Smyrna (modern İzmir).

== Reception ==
The novel has been highly popular in Greece, reaching its 107th reprint in 2022 and selling at least 423 thousand copies, despite its circulation being prohibited during the Greek military dictatorship of 1967–74. In Cyprus, it has been used as a textbook in schools during the mid-1980s.

It has been translated in several languages, including English, Spanish, Turkish, German, French, Bulgarian, Serbian, Russian, Romanian, Italian and others, having its biggest success in Turkey, where it was first published by Turkish intellectuals without the knowledge of the writer.

In 1982, Dido Sotiriou received the Abdi İpekçi Peace and Friendship Prize for promoting peace between the two countries.

A television series based on the book was transmitted by the Alpha channel in Greece in 2008. The story was also made into a theatrical play in 2022.
