= The Flowers of Romance (Greek band) =

Punk and gothic rock band

- Origin: Athens, Greece
- Genres: Gothic rock; punk rock; post-punk
- Years active: 1981–1998
- Labels: Wipe Out! Records, FM Records
- Past members: Mike Pougounas; Costas Venos; Tasos Dimitriadis; Achileas Geromoshos; Haris Stavrakas; George Venizelos; Teo Botinis; Platon Papadimitriou; Michalis Tzavaras; Aggelos Kakouratos

The Flowers of Romance was a pioneering punk and gothic rock band of the underground Greek rock scene from 1981 to 1998. The band's energetic sound and combinations of several styles of rock led to their prevalence within the underground Greek rock scene for nearly two decades, and a belief by some that they were the top Greek gothic rock group in history.

== Career ==
=== Punk era:1981–1990 ===
Inspired by punk bands such as The Clash, The Damned and the Dead Boys, lead vocalist and frontman Mike Pougounas formed The Gift along with guitarist Costas Venos and bassist Tasos Dimitriadis in February 1981 in Athens. The name The Gift did not last, and the band later changed their name to The Flowers of Romance, as a tribute to punk legend Sid Vicious and one of his pre-Sex Pistols bands.

The Flowers of Romance quickly gained a cult status throughout the underground Greek rock scene by setting themselves apart with a unique punk sound that incorporated dozens of musical styles and English-language lyrics. Tasos Dimitriadis and Costas Venos left the group in 1984.

In replacing these vacancies with Achileas Geromoshos on guitar and Haris Stavrakas on bass, 1986 saw the release of The Flowers of Romance's first tape, "Anovis". "Anovis" helped further cement the band's status as a Greek rock mainstay, a status which led to their securing a contract with Wipe Out! Records in 1988. This new contract allowed for "Autumn Kids", one of the band's most popular songs, to be released on Wipe Out!'s 12 Raw Greek Groups punk rock compilation in 1988. The Flowers of Romance underwent more changes of its members as George Venizelos was replaced by drummer Babis Efthymiou, bassist Haris Stavrakas was replaced by Teo Botinis, and guitarist Platon Papadimitriou joined the band, turning The Flowers of Romance into a five-man band for the first time. Mike Pougounas remained as the lead vocalist, and by 1990, he was the only original member of the group.

Capitalizing on the exposure from Wipe Out!'s 12 Raw Greek Groups, The Flowers of Romance began work on their first album, Dorian Grey. Its tracks consisted of the band's songs between 1986 and 1989, including "Kashmir" and "There is Nothing We Can’t Solve Together". A cover of Marc Bolan's "Children of the Revolution" was a cult hit in Greece. The Dorian Grey LP also began to showcase an evolution in The Flowers of Romance's sound, as they incorporated elements from other musical styles. The Dorian Grey LP was also the band's first foray into the gothic rock style, making the band not only the first Greek gothic rock band, but making The Dorian Grey LP the first Greek gothic rock album to be distributed internationally.

Dorian Greys release in Greece and across Europe resulted in the album becoming an underground hit for The Flowers of Romance that led to their national exposure and appearances on Greek national television in 1990. Similar to the band's later albums, Dorian Grey was considered one of the 50 best Greek rock albums of all time.

=== Gothic rock era:1990–1998 ===
In 1992, The Flowers of Romance capitalized on their cult success with the release of the Love Means Death EP and The Flowers Of Romance…The Story So Far. During the recording of the Love Means Death EP, the band's lineup again changed as guitarist Dimitris Beis replaced Plato Papadimitriou and Achileas Geromoshos. Following the release of Love Means Death, Harry Stavrakas returned to the band full-time to replace Teo Botinis.

1992 also saw the release of The Flowers Of Romance…The Story So Far. Primarily a compilation of previously unreleased material, it was a tape released solely within the UK, adding to The Flowers of Romance's string of internationally released music. The November 1993 release of the band's The Pleasure and the Pain LP revealed the band's versatility; this new album showcased a style more in line with gothic rock and featured Mike Pougounas on keyboards as well as the vocals. The 7" single, "The Pleasure and the Pain"/"Winter Waltz" was released prior to the arrival of the new album, with "Winter Waltz" becoming one of the band's most acclaimed songs since "Love Means Death". Whereas the Greek release of The Pleasure and the Pain LP was vinyl, the German edition was in CD form and featured four bonus tracks, including "Island on the Moon". The Pleasure and the Pain was another success for the band, but following production of the album, the band underwent changes in membership: drummer Michalis Tzavaras and guitarist Dimitris Beis left the band and were replaced by Dimitris Koukas and guitar player Aggelos Kakouratos, though Kakouratos only stayed with the band for a few months, with Averkios Hadjiandoniadis then replacing him.

Mike Pougounas and The Mission frontman Wayne Hussey met in 1995, and by this time The Flowers of Romance were already amidst the pre-production of their next album, Brilliant Mistakes. Wayne Hussey's keen interest in The Flowers of Romance resulted in a full collaboration. In addition to producing the album and allowing the band to record in The Mission's Bristol studio, Wayne Hussey collaborated on several songs and was able to introduce The Flowers of Romance to a broader media market. Brilliant Mistakes was released in late 1996 and became The Flowers of Romance's greatest success, with the tracks "Channel Z" and "In a Vacant Place" reaching No. 5 and No. 12 respectively on the Greek music charts. In 1997, Brilliant Mistakes had limited release in the US and UK, as well as a release in Germany under the Hyperium record label.

=== Split ===
Although The Flowers of Romance were planning a full European tour, managers of the band moved slowly in finding promoters for it. Though a breakup was never officially announced, mounting personal problems within the band caused frontman Mike Pougounas to leave the band. He founded the industrial band Nexus in 1998, and session guitarist Strouggaris decided to follow his footsteps and join Nexus. In March 2000, Pougounas founded the Cyberdelia record label.

== Discography ==
- 1990 - Dorian Grey (vinyl only – released in Greece)
- 1992 - Love Means Death (12" EP - released only in Greece)
- 1993 - "Pleasure and the Pain"/"Winter Waltz" (7" - released only in Greece)
- 1993 - Pleasure and the Pain (vinyl release in Greece/CD with 4 bonus tracks in Germany)
- 1996 - Brilliant Mistakes (CD Release - Greece and Germany)
- 1997 - "Channel Z" (CD single - released only in Germany)

== See also ==
- Greek rock
