= 9th Filmfare Awards =

1962 awards for Hindi cinema

- Date: 20 May 1962
- Site: Bombay

Highlights
- Best Film: Jis Desh Mein Ganga Behti Hai
- Best Actor: Raj Kapoor for Jis Desh Mein Ganga Behti Hai
- Best Actress: Vyjayanthimala for Gunga Jumna
- Most awards: Jis Desh Mein Ganga Behti Hai (4)
- Most nominations: Jis Desh Mein Ganga Behti Hai (10)

The 9th Filmfare Awards were held on 20 May 1962, at Bombay, honoring the best films in Hindi Cinema in 1961.

Jis Desh Mein Ganga Behti Hai led the ceremony with 10 nominations, followed by Gunga Jumna with 7 nominations.

Although a 1960 release, Jis Desh Mein Ganga Behti Hai had not been considered for the 8th Filmfare Awards. It won 4 awards, including Best Film and Best Actor (for Raj Kapoor), becoming the most-awarded film at the ceremony.

Shubha Khote received dual nominations for Best Supporting Actress for her performances in Gharana and Sasural, but lost to Nirupa Roy who won the award for Chhaya.

== Main awards ==
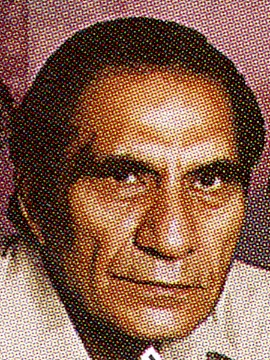
Baldev Raj Chopra, Best Director

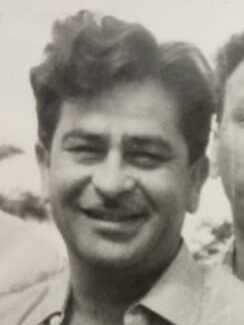
Raj Kapoor, Best Actor

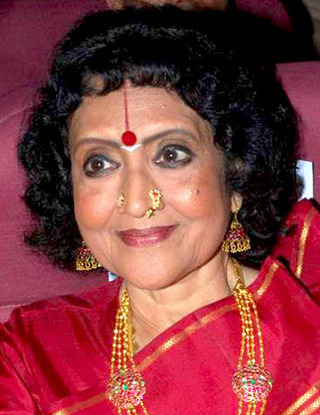
Vyjayanthimala, Best Actress

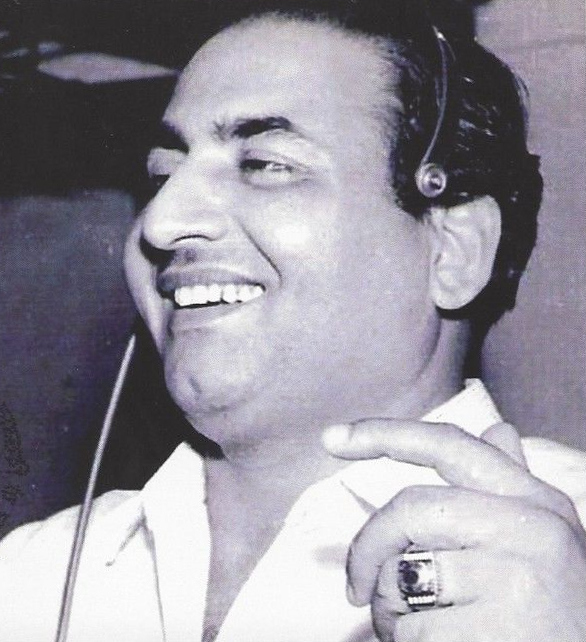
Mohammed Rafi, Best Playback Singer

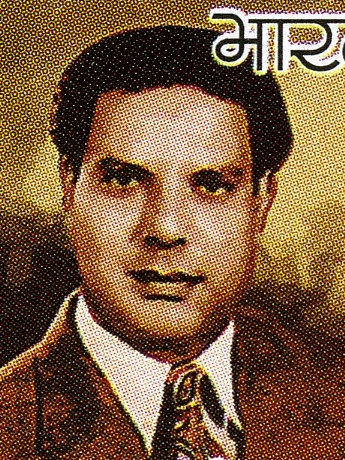
Shakeel Badayuni, Best Lyricist

Best Film	Best Director
Jis Desh Mein Ganga Behti Hai – R. K. Films – Raj Kapoor; Gunga Jumna – Citizen Films – Dilip Kumar; Kanoon – B. R. Films – B. R. Chopra	B. R. Chopra – Kanoon; Nitin Bose – Gunga Jumna; Radhu Karmakar – Jis Desh Mein Ganga Behti Hai
Best Actor	Best Actress
Raj Kapoor – Jis Desh Mein Ganga Behti Hai as Raju; Dev Anand – Hum Dono as Maj. Manohar Lal Verma/Capt. Anand; Dilip Kumar – Gunga Jumna as Gangaram "Ganga"	Vyjayanthimala – Gunga Jumna as Dhanno; Padmini – Jis Desh Mein Ganga Behti Hai as Kammo; Saira Banu – Junglee as Rajkumari 'Raj'
Best Supporting Actor	Best Supporting Actress
Nana Palsikar – Kanoon as Kaalia; Mehmood – Sasural as Mahesh; Pran – Jis Desh Mein Ganga Behti Hai as Raka	Nirupa Roy – Chhaya as Manorama / Aayah; Shubha Khote – Gharana as Ragini; Shubha Khote – Sasural as Sita
Best Music Director	Best Lyricist
Ravi – Gharana; Naushad – Gunga Jumna; Shankar–Jaikishan – Jis Desh Mein Ganga Behti Hai	Shakeel Badayuni – "Husn Wale Tera" from Gharana; Hasrat Jaipuri – "Teri Pyari Pyari Surat" from Sasural; Shailendra – "Hothon Pe Sacchai" from Jis Desh Mein Ganga Behti Hai
Best Playback Singer – Male	Best Playback Singer – Female
Mohammed Rafi – "Chashme Buddoor" from Sasural; Mohammed Rafi – "Husn Wale Tera" from Gharana; Mukesh – "Hothon Pe Sacchai" from Jis Desh Mein Ganga Behti Hai	Award won by a male singer
Best Story	Best Dialogue
C. V. Sridhar – Nazrana; C. J. Pavri – Kanoon; Mohan Kumar – Aas Ka Panchhi	Wajahat Mirza – Gunga Jumna

== Technical Awards ==
Best Editing	Best Cinematography
G. G. Mayekar – Jis Desh Mein Ganga Behti Hai	V. Balasaheb – Gunga Jumna
Best Art Direction	Best Sound Design
M. R. Acharekar – Jis Desh Mein Ganga Behti Hai	Kuldeep Singh – Junglee

== Superlatives ==
The following films had multiple wins and/or nominations

Movie	Awards	Nominations
Jis Desh Mein Ganga Behti Hai	4	10
Gunga Jumna	3	7
Gharana	2	4
Kanoon	2	4
Sasural	1	4
Junglee	1	2

== See also ==
- 8th Filmfare Awards
- 10th Filmfare Awards
