= R. K. Films =

Former film production company founded by Raj Kapoor

- Type: Private
- Industry: Bollywood
- Founded: 1948
- Founder: Raj Kapoor
- Headquarters: Chembur, Mumbai, Maharashtra
- Key people: Randhir Kapoor; Karisma Kapoor; Kareena Kapoor; Ranbir Kapoor
- Products: Films; Tech shows
- Owners: Randhir Kapoor; Rishi Kapoor; Rajiv Kapoor
- Parent: R. K. Studios LTD

R. K. Films was an Indian film production company based in R. K. Studio, a film studio, both established by and named after the Bollywood actor Raj Kapoor. It was headquartered at Chembur, Mumbai. Founded in 1948, one year after India gained independence. It had a rough start, as its first movie, Aag (1948) did not perform well at the box office. Most of the R. K. Films productions share a common theme of criticising society and depicting love across social divides.

== History ==
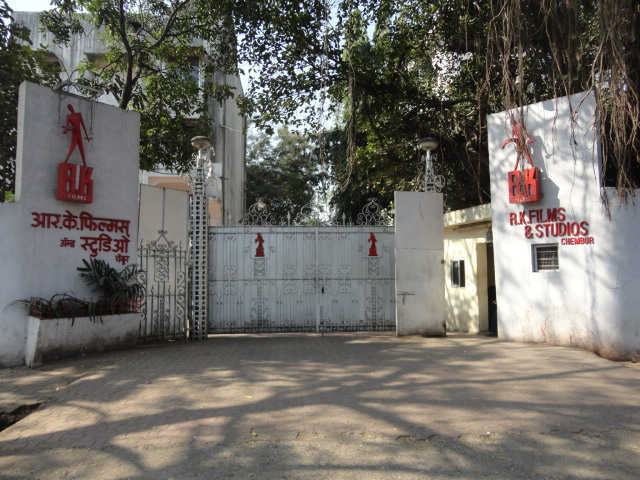
R.K. Film and R. K. Studio entrance, Chembur, Mumbai

R. K. Films was formed in 1948 by Raj Kapoor in Chembur.

After the commercial failure of the studio's first venture, Aag (1948), it found success with Barsaat (1949). After this success, the company's logo was designed to imitate the poster of Barsaat. RK Films produced many successful films such as Awaara (1951), Boot Polish, Jagte Raho and Shree 420. Awaara was particularly successful, not just in India, but all over the world. Many R. K. Films movies featured Kapoor opposite actress Nargis. Kapoor appeared in 15 R. K. films with Nargis and travelled around the world with her to promote the studio's films. The music team of Shankar Jaikishan also worked frequently on R. K. Films productions during this period. Starting with Awaara (1951), Radhu Karmakar shot all of Kapoor's subsequent films for four decades, till his last, Ram Teri Ganga Maili (1985).

R. K. Films produced many films in the next few decades, including Jis Desh Men Ganga Behti Hai (1960), Mera Naam Joker (1970), Bobby (1973), Satyam Shivam Sundaram (1978), Prem Rog (1982) and Ram Teri Ganga Maili (1985), Kapoor's last film. In the 1970s, Kapoor's eldest son Randhir Kapoor joined his father at the studio, and made his acting and directorial debut with Kal Aaj Aur Kal in 1971, which also starred his future wife Babita, father Raj and grandfather Prithviraj Kapoor. He went on to direct two more films with the company Dharam Karam (1975) and an incomplete film left by Raj, which he completed after his father's death in 1988 and Henna (1991). Raj's brother Shashi Kapoor also appeared in several R. K. films. When Raj died in 1988, Randhir took over the studio. His younger brother Rajiv Kapoor directed Prem Granth in 1996 and Rishi Kapoor directed Aa Ab Laut Chalen (1999). Hereafter, the Kapoors have produced no more films under the R. K. Films banner. Unlike other Bollywood studios of the time period, R.K. Films was able to preserve all the costumes used in its films.

On 16 September 2017, R. K. Studio caught fire and collapsed. A massive fire broke out in the studio during the shoot of a television reality show and the studio was engulfed in fire.

== Logo ==
A poster for film Barsaat, 1949, which also shows the logo of the R.K. Films

The logo of R. K. Films is based on a scene from the film Barsaat, as can be seen in the poster for the movie. The logo was later simplified. Bollywood actor Manoj Kumar has claimed that the logo was designed by Balasaheb Thackeray. It may possibly have been inspired by The Kreutzer Sonata.

== R. K. Studio ==
The studio occupied nearly two acres of land in the Mumbai-suburb of Chembur. The studio's main building was constructed in the early 1950s. Raj Kapoor's cottage was behind this building where he often organized small intimate meetings and functions. The 25th anniversary of R. K. Films was celebrated here.

There was a makeshift museum (once Nargis's dressing & make-up room) was a treasure trove which was lost in the fire. It included posters from Barsaat (1949), Awaara (1951), Aag (1948), Mera Naam Joker (1970) and Bobby (1973). It also had a large black umbrella that protected the couple from the studio rain in the song "Pyar Hua, Ikrar Hua" in Shree 420 (1955), Nargis's long black dress from Awaara, Vyjanthimala's sari(s) from Sangam, Dimple Kapadia's funky frocks from Bobby, Padmini's sari(s) from Jis Desh Mein Ganga Behti Hai, the dafali used in Mera Naam Raju (Jis Desh Mein Ganga Behti Hai) and even some of the hats Raj Kapoor wore in his films. These were lost in the fire. Rishi Kapoor regarded that as the greatest loss due to the fire.

The sets constructed at the studio included:

- Set for "Ghar Aaya Mera Pardesi" dream sequence in Kapoor's Awaara with the Elephant-inspired image
- Set for "Pyar Hua Ikrar Hua"
- Haveli Set for song "Yeh Galiyan Yeh Chaubara Yahan Aana Na Dobara", Prem Rog, 1982
- Banares set for Ram Teri Ganga Maili, 1985

Ref -

== Festivals at R. K. Studio ==
Festivals like Ganesh Chaturthi (Ganapati) and Holi were regularly celebrated by the Kapoor family together with their distinguished guests.

== Filmography ==
Movies	Year	Notes	Ref.
Aag	1948	First movie	
Barsaat	1949		
Awaara	1951		
Aah	1953		
Boot Polish	1954		
Shree 420	1955		
Jagte Raho	1956		
Ab Dilli Dur Nahin	1957		
Jis Desh Men Ganga Behti Hai	1960		
Sangam	1964		
Mera Naam Joker	1970		
Kal Aaj Aur Kal	1971		
Bobby	1973		
Dharam Karam	1975		
Satyam Shivam Sundaram	1978		
Biwi-O-Biwi	1981		
Prem Rog	1982		
Ram Teri Ganga Maili	1985		
Henna	1991		
Prem Granth	1996		
Aa Ab Laut Chalen	1999	Final film	

== Awards ==
Year	Nominee / work	Award	Result
1955	Shree 420	National Film Award for Best Feature Film in Hindi	Won
1956	Ek Din Ratre	National Film Award for Best Feature Film in Bengali	Won
1955	Boot Polish	Filmfare Award for Best Film	Won
1962	Jis Desh Mein Ganga Behti Hai	Filmfare Award for Best Film	Won
1986	Ram Teri Ganga Maili	Filmfare Award for Best Film	Won
1983	Prem Rog	Filmfare Award for Best Film	Nominated

== Acquisition ==
Godrej Properties, part of Godrej group, acquired R.K.Studios Land in 2018. The confirmation was publicly made on 3 May 2019. The company did not disclose the deal value. RK Studios sold to Godrej Properties has been made into Godrej RKS.

== See also ==
- Raj Kapoor's memorial at family farm in Pune
- Kapoor family

== Bibliography ==
- Ritu Nanda; Raj Kapoor (1991). Raj Kapoor, His Life and His Films. R.K. Films & Studios.
- Madhu Jain (2009). Kapoors: The First Family of Indian Cinema. Penguin Books Limited. pp. 339–. ISBN 978-81-8475-813-9.
