= Mera Naam Joker =

1970 Indian film by Raj Kapoor

- Theatrical release poster
- Directed by: Raj Kapoor
- Screenplay by: K. A. Abbas
- Story by: K. A. Abbas
- Produced by: Raj Kapoor
- Starring: Raj Kapoor; Simi Garewal; Rishi Kapoor; Kseniya Ryabinkina; Padmini; Manoj Kumar; Dharmendra; Dara Singh; Rajendra Kumar
- Cinematography: Radhu Karmakar
- Edited by: Raj Kapoor
- Music by: Shankar Jaikishan
- Production company: R. K. Films
- Distributed by: R. K. Films
- Release date: 18 December 1970
- Running time: 248 minutes
- Country: India
- Language: Hindi
- Box office: est. $22 million (USSR)

Mera Naam Joker (transl. My Name Is Joker) is a 1970 Indian epic romantic drama film, directed, edited and produced by Raj Kapoor under his banner R. K. Films, and written by Khwaja Ahmad Abbas. The film stars Raj Kapoor as the eponymous character, with his son Rishi Kapoor making his screen debut playing his younger version, along with Simi Garewal, Kseniya Ryabinkina, Padmini, Manoj Kumar, Rajendra Kumar, Dharmendra and Dara Singh in supporting roles. The plot focuses on a clown who must make his audience laugh at the cost of his sorrows; three women who shaped his life view his final performance.

The film is one of the lengthiest films of Indian cinema. Mera Naam Joker is the second and to date last Indian film to have two intervals, the first being Sangam (1964). After Sangam became a blockbuster, Mera Naam Joker was highly anticipated as it had been under production for six years and heavily publicized, loosely based on Kapoor's own life. The film was partly made with the participation of Soviet actors and was partly shot in Moscow. The film's music, still very popular, was composed by Shankar Jaikishan, for which the duo got their ninth Filmfare award. In India, upon release the film was critical and commercial failure, putting Kapoor into a financial crisis, as the film was panned for its length and plot. The film later on became a cult classic and is regarded as one of Raj Kapoor's best films and among the best Bollywood films of the 20th century. The film is now regarded as one of Kapoor's finest works, with film experts labeling it as a "misunderstood masterpiece".

An abridged version was released in the 1980s and had a highly successful run at the box office. Kapoor termed it his favourite film and described it as having much philosophical depth and meaning. In the Soviet Union, the film also initially drew mixed reviews from critics, yet commercially became a blockbuster at the Soviet box office after it released there in 1972. Rather than being released as a single film, the film's three chapters were released separately as three parts in the Soviet Union. The three parts of the film collectively sold 73.1 million tickets at the Soviet box office.

== Plot ==
Three women, Mary, Marina, and Meena, are each sent a toy clown and invited to the last performance of the famous clown Raj Ranbir aka Raju, in his first time on stage in 20 years. The stories of these three women and their relationships with Raju are told through a series of flashbacks during his performance.

=== Chapter I ===
As a chubby, clumsy 16 year old, Raju is known to his schoolmates as the class clown. Unlike the rest of the students at his private Christian school, Raju is poor and lives nearby with his mother and no one else. When a new teacher, Mary, comes to his school, she encourages Raju to find his ambitions and makes him more confident in himself. One day, after coming home, Raju asks his mother what his deceased father did. Despite rejecting this question in the past, she finally answers that he had worked as a clown in the circus, and died in an accident there. Raju proclaims that he will be just like his father and make everyone laugh, to the horror of his mother, who says his father had only given her tears. On a school trip to the forest, Mary accidentally falls into the river. After she comes out, Raju becomes entranced by the sight of her leg. He then follows her to a grove, where he sees her undressing. When he tries to sleep that night, Raju imagines her nude. He goes to the church to confess (Raju thinks himself a sinner for imagining his teacher nude); and after he does that Mary sees him there, and when he says he committed a sin she says that he can't have committed a sin as he is a child, Raju replies that he isn't one. When Mary and the rest of the students leave for the holidays, Raju gifts her a toy clown that his father had. Afterwards, he roams around the school, lonely and depressed. When Mary comes back, Raju is startled to discover that she has a male companion named David with her. After Raju comes to the couple's house, David starts becoming suspicious, and confronts him after he leaves but still waits outside. When Raju drops his books in shock, David discovers a paper with her picture and a heart surrounding it. Raju's mother becomes sick, and he starts dressing as a clown to sell various concoctions on the roadside to pay the school fees. However, after his classmate's mother sees him, Raju is expelled. Mary consoles him, and tells him that she will also be leaving to marry David. He attends the wedding as best man. Before the newlyweds drive off to their new life, David gifts Raju back the toy clown.

=== Chapter II ===
Raju and his ill mother move to several cities over the years before coming to Bombay. Now an adult, Raju is working as a clown at a local fair. When a group of Russian entertainers come to Gemini Circus to promote Indo-Soviet relations, he sneaks in with them and pockets their first payment. Raju claims that he is the Russian ringleader, which immediately causes Gemini's own ringleader, Sher Singh, to conspire against him. During his initial performance, Sher Singh switches off the lights, which lands Raju in a dangerous situation. After the actual ringmaster comes in, Sher Singh saves Raju and brings him to a meeting to explain himself. Raju explains that he needed a job to take care of his mother, and that he had to resort to this drama to get into the circus. Realizing his potential, circus owner Mahendra Kumar hires him. Marina, the lead trapezist, also notices him, and despite the language barrier, they become close. He comes back to his mother and tells her that he got a job, but leaves out the details. She hopes that he will be able to find a wife to "complete" the family. Soon, Raju is hired as a clown, and eventually he and Marina fall in love, with his toy clown being given away once again. However, Mahendra reminds him that the artists will be going back soon, and discourages his love. Raju and Marina meet again, and Marina realizes that his mother sees her as his future wife. She visits her again, but leaves her the toy clown departs tearfully. Raju's mother realizes through the poster that wrapped the toy that he is a clown once again, and rushes to the circus on the day of the Russians' last performance. Seeing him on the trapeze, Raju's mother dies, being reminded of the accident which caused her husband's death. Despite his sorrow, Raju performs as a clown that night. Afterwards, he decides to resign, citing his mother's death. The chapter ends with Raju seeing Marina off at the airport.

=== Chapter III ===
Alone again, Raju wanders on the beach and throws his toy clown into the sea. A dog runs out to catch it and gives it back. The dog named Moti belongs to the orphan Meenu, and the three partner up to make a roadside show and live together in an abandoned house. One day, Meenu's shirt is torn and Raju, upon discovering that she is a girl, deserts her. After a while, he comes back to her home, where she explains that her real name is Meena and that she had to act like a boy to survive on her own in the city, which she had fled to, to achieve her dream of becoming a famous actress. Raju gifts her a saree, but despite the explanation, Raju is mad that their friendship was based on a lie and leaves. After Meena confesses her love for him, Raju changes his mind. Their singing gets noticed and the duo start performing at a qawwali venue. One day, Moti gets taken by the city pound, mistaken for a stray. While Raju mourns the loss of their companion, Meena says that they have no use for Moti anymore. Her attitude shocks Raju and he figures that she only uses love as a tool to use others. Despite his pity for the qawwali venue owner who had already pre-paid them, Meena makes them move into theatre acting. While Meena maintains that she loves him, Raju is suspicious. After a while, Meena is noticed by movie star Rajendra Kumar, who wants a new heroine for his next film. Although Raju accompanies Meena to the screen tests, Kumar tells him that in order for her to become a great actress, Raju must leave. After a farewell at their old house, Raju is left alone with his toy clown.

The film then transitions back to his last show. After a song Raju announces an intermission of indeterminate length, but then reassures the audience that the "joker" still has more to perform to keep his audience laughing. The film ends with the words "Positively Not The End".

== Cast ==
- Raj Kapoor as Raju (Joker)
  - Rishi Kapoor as young Raju
- Rajendra Kumar as Himself
- Manoj Kumar as David
- Dharmendra as Mahendra Kumar
- Padmini as Meena Bansal / Meenu Master
- Simi Garewal as Mary
- Kseniya Ryabinkina as Marina
- Dara Singh as Sher Singh
- Om Prakash as Circus Surgeon
- Rajendra Nath as Circus Surgeon
- Achala Sachdev as Raju's mother
- Mongrel Moti as Dog
- Eduard Sjereda as a Member of the Soviet State Circus

== Soundtrack ==
All music is composed by Shankar–Jaikishan.

No.	Title	Lyrics	Singer(s)	Length
1.	"Ae Bhai Zara Dekh Ke Chalo"	Neeraj	Manna Dey	6:02
2.	"Ang Lag Jaa Balma" (Raga Megh Malhar)	Shailendra	Asha Bhosle	4:04
3.	"Daagh Na Lag Jaye"	Hasrat Jaipuri	Mukesh; Asha Bhosle	4:51
4.	"Jane Kahan Gaye Wo Din" (Raga Shivaranjani)	Hasrat Jaipuri	Mukesh	4:48
5.	"Kehta Hai Joker Sara Zamana"	Neeraj	Mukesh	5:28
6.	"Sadke Heer Tujh Pe"	Prem Dhawan	Mohammed Rafi	2:55
7.	"Kaate Na Kaate Raina"	Shailendra	Asha Bhosle; Manna Dey	10:13
8.	"Teetar Ke Do Aage Teetar"	Hasrat Jaipuri	Mukesh; Asha Bhosle	3:47
9.	"Jeena Yahan Marna Yahan"	Shailendra	Mukesh	4:28
10.	"Aawaara Hoon"	Shailendra	Mukesh	1:12
Total length:				47:48

== Production ==
Mera Naam Joker was under production for six years, with Raj Kapoor investing much of his own personal fortune. All his assets were mortgaged. The film has three chapters. Originally, it was to have six chapters. Khwaja Ahmad Abbas wrote the screenplay with Kapoor in mind, and several instances in the story was based on Kapoor's own life, such as the Christian school teacher episode. Kapoor approached each chapter as it were three separate films. He shot the third chapter first as Padmini and Rajendra Kumar were available at the time. By the time he began the first chapter, he was behind schedule and over the budget. The school scenes were shot at St. Paul's School, Darjeeling. The film was five hours long. The clown mask used by Kapoor in the film was burned in a fire at RK Studios in 2017.

The film also makes references to Raj Kapoor's career throughout. The popular title track of Awaara (1951) is used near the end of the second chapter. In the song "Kehta Hai Joker Saara Zamana", a child looks up reels of Shree 420 (1955) in a bioscope, which featured Nargis, who formed an iconic pair with Raj Kapoor in the 40s and 50s. The poster of Kapoor's previous film Sangam is also seen.

== Reception ==
=== India ===
Upon release in India, Mera Naam Joker was widely derided for its length and the experimental nature of its plot, and it became a critical and commercial failure. The film had two intervals. It later came to be considered a cult classic, and it is considered one of Kapoor's best films. Its reputation was revived, which happened after India was introduced to world cinema.

=== Soviet Union ===
In the Soviet Union, the film's distribution rights were sold for ₹15 lakh (US$199,351.44), the highest for an Indian film up until then. Upon release, the film initially also drew a mixed reaction from Russian critics. Despite this, the film became a commercial blockbuster at the Soviet box office after it released there in 1972. Rather than being released as a single film, the film's three chapters were released separately as three parts in the Soviet Union. The first part drew 29 million box office admissions, the second part drew 22.6 million admissions, and the final part 21.5 million admissions, adding up to a total of 73.1 million admissions at the Soviet box office. This was equivalent to an estimated 18.28 million Rbls ($22.13 million, ₹16.81 crore) at the time, or $170 million (₹1,382 crore) adjusted for inflation in 2025.

== Themes and analysis ==
The crux of the film is how Raju, the joker, entertains people and makes them laugh, but to do so hides many hardships and heartbreaks of his own life. The 'Joker' is an allegory for not just clowns, but artists and entertainers of all kinds, like Raj Kapoor himself. In the film, the audience does not concern itself with the person who is performing but accepts only the performer divorced from his personal situation, his emotions and even from his real persona. The audience embraces only the character that entertains them and does not associate with the real person playing that character. The film implies that life itself is a performance, literally turning Raju's life into chapters of a film. Therefore, to the “Joker” there is no reality outside performance, he only belongs to the stage, to his character, to the performance, and the audience.

In the end Raju gives a speech to the audience where he says that the "show" will always go on although it may have different characters, meaning that artists will go through the same across generations.

The film is also semi-autobiographical, reportedly based on the life experiences of Raj Kapoor.

== Awards ==
18th National Film Awards:

- Best Child Artist – Rishi Kapoor
- Best Male Playback Singer – Manna Dey for "Ae Bhai Zara Dekh Ke Chalo"
- Best Cinematography (Color) – Radhu Karmakar

19th Filmfare Awards:

Won

- Best Director – Raj Kapoor
- Best Music Director – Shankar–Jaikishan
- Best Male Playback Singer – Manna Dey for "Ae Bhai Zara Dekh Ke Chalo"
- Best Cinematography – Radhu Karmakar
- Best Sound Design – Allauddin Khan Qureshi

Nominated

- Best Film – Raj Kapoor
- Best Lyricist – Gopaldas Neeraj for "Ae Bhai Zara Dekh Ke Chalo"

== See also ==
- List of highest-grossing Indian films in overseas markets
- Sad clown paradox
