= Raj Kapoor bibliography =

This article contains a list of books about Hindi film director and actor Raj Kapoor.

== Books ==
- Nanda, Ritu (2002). Raj Kapoor: Speaks. Penguin Books India. ISBN 978-0-670-04952-3.
- Jain, Madhu (2009). Kapoors: The First Family of Indian Cinema. Penguin Books Limited. ISBN 978-81-8475-813-9.
- Reuben, Bunny (1995). Raj Kapoor, the Fabulous Showman: An Intimate Biography. Indus. ISBN 978-81-7223-196-5.
- Holt, Julia; Phalke, Shubhra (1995). Raj Kapoor. Basic Skills Agency. ISBN 978-1-85990-021-5.
- Nanda, Ritu; Kapūra, Rāja (1991). Raj Kapoor, His Life and His Films. R.K. Films & Studios.
- Khubchandani, Lata (2003). Raj Kapoor: The Great Showman. Rupa & Company. ISBN 978-81-7167-816-7.
- Banerjee, Shampa (1985). Profiles, five film-makers from India: V. Shantaram, Raj Kapoor, Mrinal Sen, Guru Dutt, Ritwik Ghatak. Directorate of Film Festivals, National Film Development Corp. ISBN 978-81-201-0007-7.
- Dissanayake, Wimal; Sahai, Malti (1988). Raj Kapoor's Films, Harmony of Discourses. Vikas Publishing House. ISBN 978-0-7069-4443-3.
- Reuben, Bunny (1988). Raj Kapoor: The Fabulous Showman. Virgo. ISBN 9788185304038.
- Jall, Hutokshi (1995). Raj Kapoor and Hindi films : Catalysts of Political Socialization in India. Kolkata: Statesman. OCLC 41111513.
- Chaukse, Jayprakash (1991). Jananayak Raj Kapoor. Prachi.
- Kapoor, Prithvi Raj (1952). Dīvāra; nāṭaka. Pr̥thvī Thieṭarsa-Prakāśana.
- Abbas, Khwaja Ahmad; Sāṭhe, Vasanta; Akhtar, Suhail; Vijay Jani (2010). The Dialogue of Awaara: Raj Kapoor's Immortal Classic. Niyogi Books. ISBN 978-81-89738-54-9.
- Lālacanda, Bismila Peśāvarī; Kapoor, Prithvi Raj (1971). Paṭhāna. Neśanala Pabliśiṅga Hāusa.
- Abbas, Khwaja Ahmad (1973). Bobby : the original and complete story of Raj Kapoor's great motion picture. New Delhi: Sterling. OCLC 3488899.
- Chaudhuri, Shantanu Ray; Nayak, Prashanto Kumar (2005). Icons from Bollywood : [Dilip Kumar, Dev Anand, Raj Kapoor, Guru Dutt, Kishore Kumar, Nargis, Yash Chopra, Madhubala, Rahul Dev Burman, Rajesh Khanna, Amitabh Bachchan, Javed Akhtar, Hema Malini, Aamir Khan, Shah Rukh Khan]. New Delhi: Puffin Books. ISBN 9780143334910. OCLC 644446030.
- Agravala, Prahalada (2007). राजकपूर आधी हकीकत आधा फसाना [Raj Kapoor, half real, half story] (in Hindi). New Delhi: Rajakamala. ISBN 9788126714056. OCLC 308549158.
- Caukase, Jayaprakāśa (2010). Rājakapūra : sr̥jana prakriyā (in Hindi). New Delhi: Rājakamala Prakāśana. ISBN 978-81-267-1957-0. OCLC 693110694.
- Bhagata, Bhai (1992). Digdarśaka Rāja Kapūra (in Marathi). Mumbai: Śalākā Prakāśana. OCLC 27815883.
- Birathare, Satīśa (2010). Vāha Rājakapūra (in Hindi). Indore: Raṅga Prakāśana. ISBN 9788188423118. OCLC 722454597.
- Uhl, Matthias; Kumar, Keval J. (2004). "Sangam". Indischer Film : eine Einführung. Medienumbrüche / Medienumbrüche (in German). Vol. 3. Bielefeld. pp. 66–72. ISBN 978-3-89942-183-5. OCLC 474368216.
- Kumar, Surendra (2003). Legends of Indian cinema : Pen portraits. New Delhi: Har-Anand Publications. ISBN 9788124108727. OCLC 475663771.
- Chatterjee, Gayatri (2003). Awāra. New Delhi: Penguin Books. ISBN 978-0-14-302980-9. OCLC 475663955.
- Desai, Meghnad (2012). "Raj Kapoor". In Patel, Bhaichand (ed.). Bollywood's Top 20: Superstars of Indian Cinema. Penguin Books India. pp. 89–99. ISBN 978-0-670-08572-9. OCLC 833340249.
- Charrin, Sabine (1993). Les Studios de Raj Kapoor de 1948 à 1990 : Restauration et lignes de forces d'un système de production (in French). Paris: Université de la Sorbonne Nouvelle. OCLC 491224174.
- Koṭhārī, Birena; Jhālā, Bharatakumāra (2013). Kalākāra nahīṃ, paṇa kalāsaṃsthā: Rājakapūra (in Gujarati). Amadāvāda: Buka Śelpha : Mukhya prāptisthāna, Navabhārata Sāhitya Mandira. ISBN 978-93-82678-49-6. OCLC 858529450.

== Journal articles ==
- Vasudevan, R. (1989). "The Melodramatic Mode and the Commercial Hindi Cinema: Notes on Film History, Narrative and Performance in the 1950s". Screen. 30 (3): 29–50. doi:10.1093/screen/30.3.29. ISSN 0036-9543.
- Doraiswamy, Rashmi (2002). "Image And Imagination: reconstructing the nation in cinema". India International Centre Quarterly. 29 (3/4). India International Centre: 211–223. JSTOR 23005827.
- Rajagopalan, Sudha (2006). "Emblematic of the thaw". South Asian Popular Culture. 4 (2): 83–100. doi:10.1080/14746680600796972. ISSN 1474-6689. S2CID 143183872.
