= G. G. Mayekar =

Bollywood Film Editor

- Occupation: Film editor
- Years active: 1949 – 1979
- Notable work: Shree 420 (1955), Jis Desh Men Ganga Behti Hai (1960)
- Awards: Filmfare Award for Best Editing

G. G. Mayekar was a Bollywood film editor from India who edited many Hindi and Marathi films, notably the famous films Shree 420 (1955), Jis Desh Men Ganga Behti Hai (1960).

== Career ==
The contributions from editor G. G. Mayekar, cinematographer Radhu Karmakar and art director M. R. Acharekar were significant to veteran actor Raj Kapoor and R. K. Studios' success. His other notable films he worked on include Barsaat (1949), Awara (1951), Ashiana (1952), Aah (1953), Boot Polish (1954), Teesri Kasam (1966), Rajnigandha (1974) and many others.

== Awards and nominations ==
=== Filmfare Awards ===
Filmfare Award for Best Editing

Year	Film	Role	Result
1955	Shree 420	Editor	Won
1960	Jis Desh Men Ganga Behti Hai	Editor	Won

== Filmography ==
Year	Show	Role
1949	Barsaat	Editor
1949	Dillagi	Editor
1950	Dastan	Editor
1951	Awaara	Editor
1951	Naujawan	Editor
1952	Ashiana	Editor
1953	Aah	Editor
1954	Boot Polish	Editor
1955	Char Paise	Editor
1955	Shree 420	Editor
1956	Jagte Raho	Editor
1956	Basant Bahar	Editor
1957	Ab Dilli Dur Nahin	Editor
1960	Jis Desh Men Ganga Behti Hai	Editor
1962	Rungoli	Editor
1962	Aarti	Editor
1966	Teesri Kasam	Editor
1967	Raat Aur Din	Editor
1968	Saraswatichandra	Editor
1968	Bai Mothi Bhagyachi	Editor
1969	Dharti Kahe Pukar Ke	Editor
1972	Dil Daulat Duniya	Editor
1974	Rajnigandha	Editor
1979	Manzil	Editor
