= Mera Joota Hai Japani =

Song by Mukesh

from the album Shri 420
- Language: Hindi
- Released: 1955
- Length: 4:20
- Label: Saregama
- Composer: Shankar Jaikishan
- Lyricist: Shailendra

"Mera Joota Hai Japani" (pronounced [ˈmeːɾɑː ˈdʒuːtaː ɦɛː dʒaːˈpaːniː]; lit. 'My Shoes are Japanese') is a Hindi song with music composed by Shankar Jaikishan and lyrics written by Shailendra. It was featured in the 1955 Bollywood film Shree 420, performed by popular Bollywood actor Raj Kapoor, though sung by playback singer Mukesh.

In the song, the narrator asserts pride in being Indian, despite their clothes all being from other countries. The chorus runs:

मेरा जूता है जापानी, ये पतलून इङ्ग्लिस्तानी
सर पे लाल टोपी रूसी, फिर भी दिल है हिन्दुस्तानी

Merā jūtā hai Jāpānī, ye patlūn Iṅglistānī
Sar pē lāl ṭōpī Rūsī, phir bhī dil hai Hindustānī

My shoes are Japanese, these trousers are English;
The red cap on my head is Russian, but still my heart is Indian.

Due to its patriotic themes, the song was widely embraced in its time as a representation of the newly sovereign nation of India. As India was gaining its status as a sovereign democratic republic, this song depicted the casting off of the colonialist yoke and the recognition of the internationalist aim of uniting to make India and the world a better place.

The song was also a satirical retort at some of the political leaders and rich upper class of the newly independent India, who boasted of being swadeshi in their clothes, but were extremely western in their thought, outlook, affiliations and deeds.

This song gained international fame, particularly in the Soviet Union.

== In popular culture ==
- The opening section of the 1988 novel The Satanic Verses by Salman Rushdie has the character Gibreel Farishta singing an English translation of the opening lines of the song while he is falling out of an airplane.
- The first lines from the song are heard early in the 1991 film Mississippi Masala, at a significantly tense moment during the expulsion of Indians in Uganda in 1972.
- The 2000 Bollywood film Phir Bhi Dil Hai Hindustani is named after a line in the song.
- Bengali author Mahasweta Devi quoted the lyrics in her inaugural address at the 2006 Frankfurt Book Fair:

This is truly the age where the jūtā (shoe) is Japani (Japanese), patlūn (pants) is Inglistani (English), the ṭōpī (hat) is Roosi (Russian), but the dil... dil (heart) is always Hindustani (Indian)... My country, torn, tattered, proud, beautiful, hot, humid, cold, sandy, shining India. My country.

- In the 2009 movie Today's Special starring Aasif Mandvi, "Mera Joota Hai Japani" plays on the radio in Naseeruddin Shah's cab.
- The 2012 re-make song "Bollywood" by Sasha Dith and DJ Rico Bernasconi, featured on the Buddha Bar XIV compilation, features the original recording.
- In the 2013 film Gravity, the Indian astronaut Shariff, voiced by Phaldut Sharma, sings the first line of the song while taking a break from his duties in space.
- In the 2006 novel The Inheritance of Loss, by Kiran Desai, Biju, an Indian immigrant in the US finds solace in the song among his immigrant friends and colleagues.
- A 2015 Indian satirical cartoon So Sorry: Modi in Russia about Prime Minister Narendra Modi's trip to Russia features a character inspired by the Prime Minister singing this song and dancing on the streets of winter Moscow.
- The song is played at the beginning of the American film Deadpool (2016).
- The song was sampled in Indian rapper KR$NA's single "Joota Japani", produced by Umair, which was released on 17 January 2024. The music video (set in Japan) dropped later that day, which paid homage to the singer Mukesh.
- In July 2024, during a visit to Russia, Prime Minister Narendra Modi referenced the song "Mera Joota Hai Japani" to emphasize the historical ties between India and Russia. He highlighted the line 'Sar pe lal topi Rusi, phir bhi dil hai Hindustani,' suggesting that it symbolizes the cultural connections between the two nations.

== See also ==
- Music of Bollywood
