= Param Vir Chakra (film) =

- Directed by: Ashok Kaul
- Written by: Ashok Kaul and K.K.Singh
- Produced by: Ashok Kaul
- Starring: Saeed Jaffrey; Kulbhushan Kharbanda; Hema Malini; Rajeshwari Sachdev
- Cinematography: Radhu Karmakar
- Edited by: Navneet Pataskar
- Music by: Ravindra Jain
- Release date: 31 March 1995
- Country: India
- Language: Hindi

Param Vir Chakra is a 1995 Bollywood war action film directed and written by Major Ashok Kaul. It stars Saeed Jaffrey, Kulbhushan Kharbanda and Hema Malini. The film premiered on 31 March 1995 in Mumbai.

At the 42nd National Film Awards of 1994, veteran cinematographer Radhu Karmakar, who died in 1993, was posthumously given a Special Jury Award for the film.

== Cast ==
- Hema Malini as Seema, Akash's Mother
- Salim Shaikh as Air Force Officer Akash)
- Rajeshwari Sachdev as Radha Joshi
- Navin Nischol as Mahesh Joshi Radha's Father
- Saeed Jaffrey as Naval Officer Yashpal Nanda
- Kulbhushan Kharbanda as Army Officer Khanna
- Abhijeet Sengupta as Naval Officer Ravi Chatterjee
- Rajesh Shringarpure as Army Officer Arun Khanna
- Reema Lagoo as Kamla Khanna Arun's Mother
- Raghubir Yadav as student
- Aashish Kaul as Inspector Sharma

== Soundtrack ==
#	Title	Singer(s)
1	"Gagan Se Oonchi" - Part I	Suresh Wadkar, Mohammed Aziz, Vinod Rathod
2	"Pyar Ki Vaadiyon Mein" - Part I	Alka Yagnik, Udit Narayan
3	"Pyar Ki Vaadiyon Mein" - Part II	Alka Yagnik, Udit Narayan
4	"Gagan Se Oonchi" - Part II	Suresh Wadkar, Mohammed Aziz, Vinod Rathod
5	"Sun Aaj Mere"	Kumar Sanu, Sadhna Sargam
6	"Ek Baat Kahoon"	Kumar Sanu
7	"Tujh Pe Qurban"	Ravindra Jain, Asha Bhosle
8	"My First Love"	Kumar Sanu, Suresh Wadkar, Mohammed Aziz
9	"Pyar Ke Lamhe"	Suresh Wadkar, Mohammed Aziz
10	"Param Veer Chakra"	Ravindra Jain
11	"Mere Mehboob Mere Watan"	Kumar Sanu, Suresh Wadkar, Mohammed Aziz, Asha Bhosle
