= Ek Aadmi =

- Directed by: Khwaja Ahmad Abbas
- Starring: Shabana Azmi; Parikshat Sahni; Tun Tun
- Release date: 1988
- Running time: approx 180 minutes
- Country: India
- Language: Hindi

Ek Aadmi is 1988 Hindi language movie directed by Khwaja Ahmad Abbas, starring Shabana Azmi, Parikshat Sahni and Tun Tun.
