= Mujhe Budhha Mil Gaya =

"Buddha Mil Gaya"

Song by Lata Mangeshkar
- Language: Hindi
- Released: 1964
- Length: 3:58
- Composer: Shankar Jaikishan
- Lyricist: Hasrat Jaipuri

Mujhe Budhha Mil Gaya is a Hindi film song by Lata Mangeshkar. It featured in the 1964 Hindi film Sangam produced, directed by Raj Kapoor.

The song is one of the cornerstones of Hindi film industry, where the heroine, who till now was depicted as pure, shows her sexuality and behaves like a vamp to taunt her husband, who does not want to take her to a cabaret. The song is performed by Vyjayanthimala playing the role of Radha and her husband's role of Flight Lt. Sunder Khanna played by Raj Kapoor. The song also has casting of Rajendra Kumar as Magistrate Gopal Verma. Vyjayanthimala was shown wearing tight jeans and blouse and dancing seductively to match the theme of the song.

The song holds a special place in history of Indian cinema, as it was the first time the heroine of the film was depicted seductively and with this beginning slowly the line between heroine and the vamp got blurred and Indian film heroines began to do the sensual dance songs.

The tiff between Raj Kapoor and singer Lata Mangeshkar, while recording this song has now become legendary, when she objected to some words in song. In an interview Lata Mangeshkar confirmed that she did not watch the movie due to picturization of the song.
