= Do Boond Pani =

Do Poond Pani
- Directed by: Khwaja Ahmad Abbas
- Written by: Khwaja Ahmad Abbas
- Produced by: Khwaja Ahmad Abbas
- Starring: Simi Garewal, Jalal Agha, Kiran Kumar, Madhu Chanda
- Cinematography: Ramchandra
- Music by: Jaidev
- Production company: Naya Sansar
- Release date: 1971
- Running time: 141 minutes
- Country: India
- Language: Hindi

Do Boond Pani (meaning: Two Drops of Water) is a 1971 Hindi social drama film produced and directed by Khwaja Ahmad Abbas. Made under the "Naya Sansar" banner; the story, screenplay and dialogues were by Abbas, with additional dialogues by Inder Raj Anand. The music was composed by Jaidev. The cast included Simi Garewal, Jalal Agha and Madhu Chanda and was the debut film of actor Kiran Kumar. The film won the award for Best Feature film on National integration.

Set against the backdrop of Rajasthan, the film focused on the scarcity of water, and the eventual building of a dam. Ganga Singh (Jalal Agha) goes to work on the dam, but loses his life, leaving behind his widow and a young son in the village. His sacrifice helps transform the desert land into a fertile area with the dam being called Ganga Sagar dam.

== Plot ==
Ganga Singh, newly married to Gauri, brings his wife to his village, in Rajasthan where he lives with his father Hari Singh, and sister Sonki. They live hand to mouth in the poor village which is suffering from drought and villagers have to travel a long distance to get water. Ganga Singh hears of a dam being constructed and leaves his wife to join in the building of it. His family goes through misfortunes, with his father dying and his sister being raped by the dacoit Mangal Singh. Ganga himself dies preventing a disaster at the dam. The dam is eventually built bringing greenery to an arid region. His wife bears a son and lives on in the village.

== Cast ==
- Jalal Agha as Ganga Singh
- Simi Garewal as Gauri
- Madhu Chanda as Sonki
- Sajjan as Hari Singh
- Prakash Thapa as Mangal Singh
- Kiran Kumar as Mohan Kaul
- Rashid Khan as Bhikhu
- Pinchoo Kapoor as Postman

== Reception ==
The film was referred to as an "inspirational melodrama" and the music by Jaidev was stated as a "magisterial score", however, the film was not a commercial success and flopped at the box office.

== Awards ==
- Nargis Dutt Award for Best Feature Film on National Integration.

== Soundtrack ==
Composer Jaidev got Asha Bhosle to sing for Do Boond Pani, for the song "Ja Ri Pawaniya". The lyricists were Kaifi Azmi, Balkavi Bairagi and M. R. Mukul. The playback singing was provided by Asha Bhosle, Lakshmi Shankar, Parveen Sultana, Meenu Purushottam, Mukesh, Ambar Kumar, Shrikant Moghe and Bhushan Mehta.

=== Song list ===
#	Title	Singer	Lyricist
1	"Ja Ri Pawaniya Piya Ke Des Ja"	Asha Bhosle	Kaifi Azmi
2	"Bani Teri Bindiya Ki"	Lakshmi Shankar	Balkavi Bairagi
3	"Peetal Ki Mori Gaagri" (Happy)	Parveen Sultana, Minu Purushottam	Kaifi Azmi
4	"Peetal Ki Mori Gaagri" (Sad)	Parveen Sultana	Kaifi Azmi
5	"Mar Gai Mar Gai Re"	Meenu Purushottam, Ambar Kumar, Bhushan Mehta	Kaifi Azmi
6	"Do Boond Pani"	Mukesh	Kaifi Azmi
7	"Sai Naam"	Shrikant Moghe, Ambar Kumar	M. R. Mukul
