= Kseniya Ryabinkina =

Russian professional ballet dancer and character actor

- Ксения Рябинкина
- Kseniya Ryabinkina in Johar Mehmood in Goa (1965)
- Born: Kseniya Lvovna Ryabinkina; 4 September 1945 (age 81); Moscow, Russian SFSR, Soviet Union
- Occupations: Actress, ballerina
- Spouse: Aleksei Stychkin
- Children: Evgeniy Stychkin

Kseniya Lvovna Ryabinkina (Russian: Ксения Львовна Рябинкина) is a Russian professional ballet dancer and character actor. She has appeared in Soviet, Russian and Hindi cinema since the 1960s.

== Early life ==
Kseniya Ryabinkina was born in Moscow to a ballerina mother and a geo-physics doctor. She has an elder sister by four years by name of Elena, also an accomplished ballerina.

== Career ==
She started her career as a ballerina in Moscow’s Bolshoi Theatre.

She is best remembered in India as Marina, the Russian circus trapeze artiste cum love interest from Raj Kapoor's classic 1970 film Mera Naam Joker.

== Later years ==
In 2009, the Russian actress made her return to Bollywood. Ryabinkina acted in Chintuji, a film that was loosely based on incidents from Raj Kapoor's son – Rishi Kapoor's life. She still mentors ballerinas and actors in Russia.

== Filmography ==
Key
†	Denotes films that have not yet been released

Year	Film	Role(s)	Language	Notes
1967	The Tale of Tsar Saltan	Princess Swan		
1970	Carmen Syuta			
1970	Mera Naam Joker	Marina	Hindi	
2009	Chintu Ji		Hindi	
2018	White Crow	Kseniya		
