= Aasman Mahal =

- Directed by: K. A. Abbas
- Written by: K. A. Abbas
- Produced by: K. A. Abbas
- Starring: Dilip Raj; Surekha; Nana Palsikar; David
- Cinematography: Ramchandra
- Music by: J. P. Kaushik
- Production company: Naya Sansar
- Release date: 1965
- Running time: 172 minutes
- Country: India
- Language: Hindi

Aasman Mahal (lit. 'Sky palace') is a 1965 Hindi social family drama film directed by K. A. Abbas. Produced for the "Naya Sansar" banner, its story was written by Abbas, and the cinematographer was Ramchandra. The script and dialogues were by Inder Raj Anand. Prithviraj Kapoor's role as the impoverished Nawab, was acclaimed in the film for its "authenticity". Dilip Raj, son of P. Jairaj, played the hero, having earlier acted in Shehar Aur Sapna (1963). The other co-stars were Surekha, David, Nana Palsikar, Anwar Hussain.

The story revolves around a Nawab, who having lost his money, still continues to live in the old traditional style, maintaining a grandeur facade. His son opposes the unrealistic life-style.

== Plot ==
An elderly impoverished Nawab lives in his ancestral Haveli (Mansion). A business man wants to buy it, in order to convert it into a hotel. Though financially in a desperate state, the Nawab refuses to sell his property and clings on to his old-fashioned ideals of nobility. His son, is dissolute and not of much account, but he is able to let go of the aristocratic baggage. He is in love with the daughter of the house help.

Aasman Mahal evokes other stories of a decaying aristocracy like Chekhov's The Cherry Orchard set in Russia and Lampedusa's The Leopard set in Sicily and Premchand's Shatranj Ke Khilari set in Lucknow.

== Cast ==
- Prithviraj Kapoor
- Dilip Raj
- Surekha
- Nana Palsikar
- Mridula Rani
- David Abraham
- Anwar Hussain
- Madhukar
- Irshad Panjatan
- Rashid Khan

== Production ==
Cited in the Limca Book of Records to be one of the first films to be "shot on location without sets", thereby not making use of "studio" sets. The film shooting took place in its entirety in Hyderabad. Prithviraj Kapoor's acting won him a special "Honor at the Karlovy Awards".

== Soundtrack ==
One of the notable songs by composer J. P. Kaushik from the film, and described as an "introspective" and "philosophical" number, was "Main Aahein Bhar Nahin Sakta". The lyricists were Ali Sardar Jafri and Majaz Lakhnawi, and the singers were Vijaya Majumdar, Mahendra Kapoor, Geeta Dutt and Madhukar.

=== Songlist ===
#	Title	Singer	Lyricist
1	"Tune Samjha Hi Nahi Kya Hai"	Vijaya Mazumdar	Ali Sardar Jafri
2	"Main Aahe Bhar Nahi Sakta"	Mahendra Kapoor, Vijaya Majumdar	Majaz Lakhnawi
3	"Khubsurat Hai Teri Tarah Shikayat Teri"	Mahendra Kapoor	Ali Sardar Jafri
4	"Ae Raat Zara Aahista Guzar"	Geeta Dutt, Madhukar	Ali Sardar Jafri
5	"Kaun Achcha Hai Yahan Kaun Kharab"	Mahebdra Kapoor	Ali Sardar Jafri
6	"Mai Sharabi Hoon"	Mahendra Kapoor, Vijaya Majumdar	Ali Sardar Jafri
