= 8th National Film Awards =

Indian ceremony celebrating cinema of 1960

- Awarded for: Best of Indian cinema in 1960
- Awarded by: Ministry of Information and Broadcasting
- Presented by: Sarvepalli Radhakrishnan (Vice President of India)
- Presented on: 31 March 1961
- Site: Vigyan Bhavan, New Delhi
- Official website: dff.nic.in
- Best Feature Film: Anuradha

The 8th National Film Awards, then known as State Awards for Films, presented by Ministry of Information and Broadcasting, India to felicitate the best of Indian Cinema released in 1960. Ceremony took place at Vigyan Bhavan, New Delhi on 31 March 1961 and awards were given by then Vice-President of India, Dr. Sarvepalli Radhakrishnan.

Starting with 8th National Film Awards, new category of awards for Educational Films was introduced. This category includes Prime Minister's gold medal and Certificate of Merit for second and third best educational film.

== Awards ==
Awards were divided into feature films and non-feature films.

President's gold medal for the All India Best Feature Film is now better known as National Film Award for Best Feature Film, whereas President's gold medal for the Best Documentary Film is analogous to today's National Film Award for Best Non-Feature Film. For children's films, Prime Minister's gold medal is now given as National Film Award for Best Children's Film. At the regional level, President's silver medal for Best Feature Film is now given as National Film Award for Best Feature Film in a particular language. Certificate of Merit in all the categories is discontinued over the years.

=== Feature films ===
Feature films were awarded at All India as well as regional level. For the 8th National Film Awards, a Hindi film Anuradha won the President's gold medal for the All India Best Feature Film. Following were the awards given:

==== All India Award ====
Following were the awards given in each category:

Award	Film	Language	Awardee(s)	Cash prize
President's gold medal for the All India Best Feature Film	Anuradha	Hindi	Producer: Hrishikesh Mukherjee	Gold Medal and ₹20,000
President's gold medal for the All India Best Feature Film	Anuradha	Hindi	Director: Hrishikesh Mukherjee	₹5,000
All India Certificate of Merit for Second Best Feature Film	Kshudhita Pashan	Bengali	Producer: Hemen Ganguly	Certificate of Merit and ₹10,000
All India Certificate of Merit for Second Best Feature Film	Kshudhita Pashan	Bengali	Director: Tapan Sinha	₹2,500
All India Certificate of Merit for the Third Best Feature Film	Deivapiravi	Tamil	Producer: Kamal Brothers Pvt Ltd	Certificate of Merit only
All India Certificate of Merit for the Third Best Feature Film	Deivapiravi	Tamil	Director: R. Krishnan	Certificate of Merit only
All India Certificate of Merit for the Third Best Feature Film	Deivapiravi	Tamil	Director: S. Panju	Certificate of Merit only
Prime Minister's gold medal for the Best Children's Film	Phool Aur Kaliyan	Hindi	Producer: Rajkamal Kalamandir	Gold Medal and ₹20,000
Prime Minister's gold medal for the Best Children's Film	Phool Aur Kaliyan	Hindi	Director: Ram Gabale	₹5,000
All India Certificate of Merit for the Second Best Children's Film	Idd Mubarak	Hindi	Producer: Children's Film Society	Certificate of Merit and ₹10,000
All India Certificate of Merit for the Second Best Children's Film	Idd Mubarak	Hindi	Director: Khwaja Ahmad Abbas	₹2,500
All India Certificate of Merit for the Third Best Children's Film	Delhi Ki Kahani	Hindi	Producer: Children's Film Society	Certificate of Merit only
All India Certificate of Merit for the Third Best Children's Film	Delhi Ki Kahani	Hindi	Director: Rajendra Kumar	Certificate of Merit only

==== Regional Award ====
The awards were given to the best films made in the regional languages of India. With 8th National Film Awards, new award category was introduced for the feature films made in Gujarati and Odia language. These newly introduced categories includes President's silver medal for Best Feature Film and Certificate of Merit for second and third best film in both the languages, although former was not given for Gujarati language as no film was found suitable for the award. Along with Gujarati, President's silver medal for Best Feature Film was also not given in Kannada language, instead Certificate of Merit was awarded. No awards were given in Assamese and Malayalam language as no film was found to be suitable.

Award	Film	Awardee(s)	
Award	Film	Producer	Director
Feature Films in Bengali
President's silver medal for Best Feature Film	Devi	Satyajit Ray	Satyajit Ray
Certificate of Merit	Ganga	Cine Art Production Pvt Ltd.	Rajen Tarafdar
Feature Films in Gujarati
Certificate of Merit	Mendi Rang Lagyo	Bipin Gajjar	Manhar Raskapur
Feature Films in Hindi
President's silver medal for Best Feature Film	Mughal-e-Azam	K. Asif	K. Asif
Certificate of Merit	Jis Desh Men Ganga Behti Hai	Ranbir Raj Kapoor	Radhu Karmakar
Certificate of Merit	Kanoon	B. R. Chopra	B. R. Chopra
Feature Films in Kannada
Certificate of Merit	Bhakta Kanakadasa	D. R. Naidu	Y. R. Swami
Feature Films in Marathi
President's silver medal for Best Feature Film	Kanyadaan	Surel Chitra	Madhav Shinde
Certificate of Merit	Umaj Padel Tar	Narayan Baburao Kamat	Dinkar D. Patil
Feature Films in Odia
President's silver medal for Best Feature Film	Sri Lokenath	Rupa Raga Pvt Ltd.	Prafulla Kumar Sengupta
Feature Films in Tamil
President's silver medal for Best Feature Film	Parthiban Kanavu	Jubilee Films Pvt Ltd.	D. Yoganand
Certificate of Merit	Paathai Theriyuthu Paar	Kumari Films Pvt Ltd.	Nemai Ghosh
Certificate of Merit	Kalathur Kannamma	AVM Productions	A. Bhimsingh
Feature Films in Telugu
President's silver medal for Best Feature Film	Mahakavi Kalidasu	Sarani Productions	K. Kameshwara Rao
Certificate of Merit	Sri Seetha Rama Kalyanam	N. A. T. Pvt Ltd.	N. Trivikrama Rao

=== Non-Feature films ===
Non-feature film awards were given for the documentaries and educational films made in the country. Following were the awards given:

==== Documentaries ====
Award	Film	Language	Awardee(s)	Cash prize
President's gold medal for the Best Documentary Film	Kangra and Kulu	English	Producer: Films Division	Gold Medal and ₹4,000
President's gold medal for the Best Documentary Film	Kangra and Kulu	English	Director: N. S. Thapu	₹1,000
All India Certificate of Merit for the Second Best Documentary Film	Saga of Service	English	Producer: Films Division	Certificate of Merit and ₹2,000
All India Certificate of Merit for the Second Best Documentary Film	Saga of Service	English	Director: Dilip Jamdar	₹500
All India Certificate of Merit for the Third Best Documentary Film	The Weavers	English	Director: F. R. Bilimoria	Certificate of Merit only
All India Certificate of Merit for the Third Best Documentary Film	The Weavers	English	Producer: Films Division	Certificate of Merit only

==== Educational films ====
Award	Film	Language	Awardee(s)	Cash prize
Prime Minister's gold medal for the Best Educational Film	Pond Culture	English	Producer: Films Division	Gold Medal and ₹4,000
Prime Minister's gold medal for the Best Educational Film	Pond Culture	English	Director: N. K. Issar	₹1,000
All India Certificate of Merit for the Second Best Educational Film	Cotton	English	Producer: Films Division	Certificate of Merit only
All India Certificate of Merit for the Second Best Educational Film	Cotton	English	Director: Krishna Kapil	Certificate of Merit only
All India Certificate of Merit for the Third Best Educational Film	Wheat	English	Producer: Films Division	Certificate of Merit only
All India Certificate of Merit for the Third Best Educational Film	Wheat	English	Director: Krishna Kapil	Certificate of Merit only

=== Awards not given ===
Following were the awards not given as no film was found to be suitable for the award:

- President's silver medal for Best Feature Film in Assamese
- President's silver medal for Best Feature Film in Kannada
- President's silver medal for Best Feature Film in Malayalam
