= Nana Palshikar =

Indian actor

- Born: 1907; Mumbai, Bombay Presidency, British India
- Died: 1 June 1984 (aged 76–77); Mumbai, Maharashtra, India
- Occupation: actor
- Years active: 1935–1984

Nana Palshikar (Marathi: नाना पळशीकर) (1907 – 1 June 1984) was an Indian actor who appeared in over 80 Hindi films. He made his film debut in 1935 with Dhuwandhar, and went on to play character roles in both Hindi mainstream and arthouse films. He was also cast in small parts in a few international productions such as Maya (1966), The Guru (1969) and Gandhi (1982). Palshikar was awarded the Filmfare Award for Best Supporting Actor twice, in 1962 and 1965. He was recognised with an award in the same category by the Bengal Film Journalists' Association in 1965.

== Career ==
Palshikar made his first film appearance in 1935 along with Leela Chitnis in Sukumar Chatterjee's Dhurandhar. He appeared in two more films in this decade, Kangan and Durga (1939), both of which were produced at the Bombay Talkies production house and were the two final films directed by German director Franz Osten.

After a long break of 14 years, during which he appeared only in one film Bahurani (1940), he returned to the screen in Bimal Roy's 1953 picture Do Bigha Zamin (Two Acres of Land), in which he played Dhangu Maheto, alongside actors such as Balraj Sahni and Nirupa Roy. The film was a major critical success and won several national and international honours. He followed it with supporting roles in other successful films of this decade, such as V. Shantaram's Jhanak Jhanak Payal Baaje, Bimal Roy's Devdas, Raj Kapoor's Shree 420, Sombhu Mitra's Jagte Raho and Hrishikesh Mukherjee's Anari.

In 1960, Palshikar appeared in Kanoon, a courtroom drama involving a murder case. Directed by B. R. Chopra, the film saw Palshikar playing Kaalia, a petty thief who is caught and charged with murder for no fault of his own. Palshikar's performance earned him his first Filmfare Award for Best Supporting Actor. In a retrospective review in 2009, The Hindu noted: "the star of the second half is Nana Palshikar, who slips into the role of a petty thief with a commanding performance."

In 1963, Palshikar appeared in Khwaja Ahmad Abbas's Shehar Aur Sapna (The City and The Dreams). It is a social film which portrays the struggle of pavement dwellers in the backdrop of rapid industrialisation. The film, a love story that takes place in a drain pipe, received the President's Gold Medal Award and the National Film Award for Best Feature Film. Palshikar's performance as Johnny earned him his second Filmfare Award for Best Supporting Actor, and he was acknowledged as Best Supporting Actor (Hindi) by the Bengal Film Journalists' Association.

John Berry's Maya (1966) saw Palshikar playing Sajid Khan's father. In 1969, James Ivory cast him in the foreign co-production The Guru. Ivory said: "I didn't know a great deal about him when we cast him... He was said to be a very good actor, which I took on faith." Judith Crist from the New York Magazine described his small part of "The Guru's Guru" in the film as "an unforgettable cameo".

In the 1970s, Palshikar continued to portray father figures or authoritative characters such as judges. For instance, he played a father in many films such as B. R. Chopra's Dhund, based on Agatha Christie's play The Unexpected Guest in 1973 and Yaaron Ka Yaar in 1977. However, these roles were generally relatively minor and he was often uncredited for his performances, such as his role as a judge in Jwar Bhata in 1972.

He continued playing a father into the 1980s, appearing in Aakrosh (1980), playing Om Puri's dad. His last major film was in the epic film Gandhi in 1982, a Richard Attenborough directed biographical film based on the life of Mohandas Gandhi, who led the nonviolent resistance movement against British colonial rule in India during the first half of the 20th century. However, his role was very minor, playing a villager. His last appearance was in the film Kanoon Kya Karega, again playing a parent.

He died on 1 June 1984 in Bombay, aged 77.

== Awards ==
- 1962: Filmfare Best Supporting Actor Award - Kanoon
- 1965: Filmfare Best Supporting Actor Award - Shehar Aur Sapna
- 1965: BFJA Awards, Best Supporting Actor (Hindi) - Shehar Aur Sapna

== Filmography ==
- Dhuwandhar (1935)
- Kangan (1939)
- Durga (1939)
- Bahurani (1940)
- Jhoola (1941)
- Kunwara Baap (1942)
- Shakuntala (1943)
- Do Bigha Zamin (1953) as Dhangu Maheto
- Shamsheer (1953)
- Daera (1953)
- Baap Beti (1954)
- Shree 420 (1955) as Gambler with goatee
- Sabse Bada Rupaiya (1955)
- Railway Platform (1955) as Station Master
- Jhanak Jhanak Payal Baaje (1955) as Sadhu
- Devdas (1955) as Street singer
- Jagte Raho (1956) as Doctor
- Shatranj (1956)
- New Delhi (1956) as Subramaniam
- Bandhan (1956)
- Do Roti (1957) as Malti's Dad
- Baarish (1957) as Gopal dada
- Ab Dilli Dur Nahin (1957) as Mukundlal's lawyer
- Teerth Yatra (1957)
- Phir Subah Hogi (1958) as Sohni's Father (uncredited)
- Karigar (1958) as Astrologer
- Jailor (1958) as Ramsingh Choudhry
- Gaj Gauri (1958)
- Farishta (1958)
- Char Dil Char Raahein (1959) as Pujariji
- Jaalsaaz (1959)
- Anari (1959) as Evil Priest
- Jis Desh Men Ganga Behti Hai (1960) as Tau
- Mera Ghar Mere Bachche (1960) as Sharmaji
- Kanoon (1960) as Kaalia
- College Girl (1960) as Biharilal Sharma
- Maya (1961) as Jyothsi (uncredited)
- Babasa Ri Laadi (1961)
- Aashiq (1962) as Thakur / Renuka's Father
- Main Chup Rahungi (1962) as Narayan
- Bijli Chamke Jamna Paar (1962)
- Shehar Aur Sapna (1963) as Johhny, the violinist
- Nartakee (1963) as Prof. Verma
- Gumrah (1963) as Meena's Father
- Bharosa (1963) as Shivcharan Das
- Sangam (1964) as Nathu
- Dosti (1964) as Sharma
- Cha Cha Cha (1964) as Gyan Das
- Shagoon (1964)
- Pooja Ke Phool (1964) as Hansraj
- Hamara Ghar (1964)
- Geet Gaaya Pattharonne (1964) as Dinanath
- Door Gagan Ki Chhaon Mein (1964)
- Bhoot Bungla (1965) as Ramlal 'Ramu'
- Arzoo (1965)
- Aasmaan Mahal (1965)
- Maya (1966) as Raji's Father
- Biradari (1966) as Deepu
- Anupama (1966) as Mohan Sharma's assistant (uncredited)
- Aakhri Khat (1966)
- Hamraaz (1967) as Jumma
- Boond Jo Ban Gayee Moti (1967) as Head Master
- Baharon Ke Sapne (1967) as Bholanath
- Aurat (1967) as Parvati's Moneylender
- Duniya (1968) as Girdhari
- Balram Shri Krishna (1968)
- Man Ka Meet (1969) as Doctor
- The Guru (1969) as The Guru's Guru
- Sambandh (1969) as Nityada
- Prarthana (1969)
- Jaal Saz (1969) as Mahavir
- Doli (1969) as Ganpat Lala
- Aadmi Aur Insaan (1969) as Justice B.N. Desai
- Heer Raanjha (1970) as Diwan, the King's Inquisitor
- Uphaar (1971) as Ramchandra Awasthi
- Ganga Tera Pani Amrit (1971) as Masterji
- Dushmun (1971) as Ganga Din
- Rut Rangeeli Ayee (1972) as Kundanlal
- Dastaan (1972) as Dr. Khanna
- Lalkar (1972) as Colonel Kapoor
- Joroo Ka Ghulam (1972) as Nandlal
- Yaar Mera (1972) as Deena Nath
- Shor (1972)
- Jeet (1972) as Ratan's dad (uncredited)
- Badle Ki Aag (1973)
- Dhund (1973) as The Judge
- Jwar Bhata (1973) as Judge #2 (uncredited)
- Prem Parbat (1973)
- Naya Nasha (1973) as Protesting student's dad
- Prem Nagar (1974) as Puran
- Ishq Ishq Ishq (1974)
- Albeli (1974)
- Dharmatma (1975) as Purshottam (Kundan's dad)
- Sikka (1976)
- Subah Zaroor Aayegi (1977)
- Shyam Tere Kitne Naam (1977)
- Nachdi Jawani (1977) punjabi movie
- Yaaron Ka Yaar (1977) as Malti's dad
- Paapi (1977) as Seth. Ghanshyamdas
- Karm (1977) as Shivlal (Premnath's father-in-law)
- Daku Aur Mahatma (1977)
- Charandas (1977) as Judge
- Ganga Ki Saugandh (1978) as Keshavram
- Pati Patni Aur Woh (1978) as Nirmala's Nanaji
- Saajan Bina Suhagan (1978) as Asha's dad
- Jaandaar (1979)
- Aakrosh (1980) as Bhiku's dad
- The Burning Train (1980) as Seema's Mamaji
- The Naxalites (1980) as Charu Majumdar
- Swayamvar (1980) as Purohit Shankarprasad
- Sampoorna Santoshi Maa Ki Mahima (1981)
- Agni Pareeksha (1981) as Dinanath Sharma
- Gandhi (1982) as Villager
- Unchi Uraan (1984)
- Kanoon Kya Karega (1984) as Parent of accused youth (final film role)
