= The Naxalites =

- Film poster
- Directed by: Khwaja Ahmad Abbas
- Produced by: Khwaja Ahmad Abbas
- Starring: Mithun Chakraborty; Smita Patil; Dina Pathak; Jalal Agha; Bijaya Jena; Imtiaz; Nana Palsikar
- Music by: Prem Dhawan
- Release date: 1980
- Running time: 120 minutes
- Country: India
- Language: Hindi

The Naxalites is a 1980 Indian Hindi-language film directed by Khwaja Ahmad Abbas, starring Mithun Chakraborty, Smita Patil, Dina Pathak, Jalal Agha, Bijaya Jena, Imtiaz and Nana Palsikar.

== Plot ==
The Naxalites is the story of Naxalites and their life struggle against the system.

== Songs ==
1. "Aaj Apne Lahu Se" – Antara Chowdhury

== Cast ==
- Mithun Chakraborty as Amor Kal
- Smita Patil as Ajitha
- Nana Palsikar as Charu Majumdar
- Dina Pathak
- Jalal Agha
- Bijaya Jena
- Pinchoo Kapoor
- Asit Sen
- Imtiaz Khan as Haider Khan
- Priyadarshini
- Sunil Lahri
