= Jagte Raho =

- Film poster
- Directed by: Sombhu Mitra; Amit Maitra
- Written by: K. A. Abbas
- Screenplay by: Sombhu Mitra; Amit Maitra
- Story by: Sombhu Mitra; Amit Maitra
- Produced by: Raj Kapoor
- Starring: Pradeep Kumar; Sumitra Devi; Smriti Biswas; Pahari Sanyal; Sulochana Chatterjee; Daisy Irani; Nemo; Motilal; Nana Palsikar; Iftekhar; Raj Kapoor; Nargis
- Cinematography: Radhu Karmakar
- Edited by: G. G. Mayekar
- Music by: Salil Chowdhury
- Distributed by: R.K. Films Ltd.
- Release date: 3 August 1956
- Running time: 149 minutes
- Country: India
- Languages: Hindi; Bengali

Jagte Raho (transl. Stay Awake or Stay Alert) is a 1956 Hindi/Bengali film, directed by Amit Maitra and Sombhu Mitra, written by Khwaja Ahmad Abbas, and produced by and starring Raj Kapoor. The film centers on the trials of a poor villager (Kapoor) who comes to a city in search of a better life. However, the naive man soon becomes trapped in a web of middle-class greed and corruption. The film also features a cameo by Nargis in the final scene.

It was produced in Bengali as Ek Din Raatre, starring Raj Kapoor, Chhabi Biswas, Pahari Sanyal, Nargis Dutt and Daisy Irani. The film won the Crystal Globe Grand Prix at the Karlovy Vary International Film Festival in Czechoslovakia in 1957.

== Plot summary ==
A poor peasant (Kapoor) from the village, who comes to the city in search of work, is looking for some water to quench his thirst. He enters an apartment complex, whose residents take him for a thief and chase him. He runs from one flat to another trying to escape his predicament. Along the way, he witnesses many shady undertakings in the flats where he hides. Ironically, these crimes are being committed by the so-called "respectable" citizens of the city, who by day lead a life totally in contrast to their nighttime deeds behind closed doors.

He is shocked by these events and tries to escape by evading the search parties patrolling the apartment building in search of the elusive thief. He is unfortunately seen, and people chase him to the roof of the building. He puts up a brave resistance and then descends by the water pipes onto the porch of a flat. He goes in to find a young girl (Daisy Irani). She talks to him and kindles a self-belief in the peasant, who determinedly tries to face the adversity waiting outside. But when he ventures out of the flat, he is surprised to find that nobody takes notice of him. He eventually leaves the apartment building, his thirst still unquenched. He hears a beautiful song and searching for its source arrives at the doorstep of a woman (Nargis) drawing water from a well. His thirst is finally assuaged.

== Music ==
Other than the acting, the music is the highlight of the film. Lyrics are by Shailendra and Prem Dhawan and music is by Salil Chowdhury.

The songs are

1. "Zindagi Khawab Hai, Khvaab Me Jhuth Kya Aur Bhala Sach Hai Kya" - Mukesh

2. "Main Koi Jhoot Boleya" - Mohammed Rafi and S. Balbir (Lyrics by Prem Dhawan)

3. "Jaago Mohan Pyaare" - Lata Mangeshkar (Raag Bhairav)

4. "Thandee Thandee Savan Kee Phuhar" - Asha Bhosle

5. "Maine Jo Li Angdayi" - Haridhan, Sandhya Mukherjee

=== Bengali version ===
The song "Zindagi Khwab Hai", picturized on Motilal in Hindi was recorded as "Ei Duniaye Shobi Hoi" (Sung by Manna Dey) in the Bengali version and was picturized on Chhabi Biswas. Most of the story line is identical between the two versions, as were the songs; "Teki Main Jhuth Boliya", sung by Mohammed Rafi and picturized on Sikh drivers is consistent in both versions. "Jago Mohan Pritam", sung by Lata Mangeshkar is common to both versions - only the lyrics were changed to Hindi and Bengali, as applicable.

== Cast ==
- Raj Kapoor as Peasant
- Nargis as Temple singer
- Pradeep Kumar as Pradeep
- Sumitra Devi as Singing drunk's wife
- Smriti Biswas as Sati
- Pahari Sanyal as Shashan
- Sulochana Chatterjee as Meenu
- Daisy Irani as Daughter of tenant
- Motilal as Singing Drunk (Only in Hindi version)
- Chhabi Biswas as Singing Drunk (Only in Bengali version)
- Nana Palsikar as Doctor
- Iftekhar as Chandu (Leader)
- Nemo as Ramnarayan 'Rambabu' Malik
- Manohar Deepak in song "Main Koi Jhoot Boleya"
- Mauji Singh in song "Main Koi Jhoot Boleya"
- Kartar Singh in song "Main Koi Jhoot Boleya"

== Reception ==
=== Box office ===
Jagte Raho was an overseas blockbuster at the Soviet box office, drawing 33.6 million Soviet viewers in 1965, due to Raj Kapoor's popularity in the Soviet Union. In the Soviet Union, the film earned an estimated 8.4 million Rbls (US$9.33 million or ₹4.44 crore) in 1965, equivalent to US$95 million (₹ 477 crore) in 2016. (Note: Jagte Raho in Soviet Union: 8.4 million Rbls (Note: 33.6 million Soviet tickets sold, average ticket price of 25 kopecks) (US$9.33 million, (Note: 0.9 Rbl per US dollar from 1961 to 1971) ₹4.44 crore) (Note: 4.7619 Indian rupees per US dollar from 1950 to 1965) in 1965 (US$95 million or ₹ 477 crore in 2016))

=== Awards ===
A shortened version of the film won the Crystal Globe Grand Prix at the Karlovy Vary International Film Festival in Czechoslovakia in 1957. At the fourth annual National Film Awards, the film won the Certificate of Merit.
