= Jis Desh Mein Ganga Behti Hai =

- Film poster
- Directed by: Radhu Karmakar
- Written by: Arjun Dev Rashk
- Produced by: Raj Kapoor
- Starring: Raj Kapoor; Padmini Ramachandran; Pran
- Cinematography: Tara Dutt
- Edited by: G. G. Mayekar
- Music by: Shankar Jaikishan; Shailendra (lyrics); Hasrat Jaipuri (lyrics)
- Release date: 1960
- Running time: 167 min
- Country: India
- Language: Hindi
- Box office: ₹2 crore

Jis Desh Mein Ganga Behti Hai (transl. The country in which the Ganges flows) was an Indian film released in 1960, directed by Radhu Karmakar and produced by Raj Kapoor. The film stars Padmini, Raj Kapoor and Pran in lead roles. This was the first directorial venture of Karmakar, who had previously been cinematographer for many of Kapoor's films. It was declared a "hit" at Box Office India.

The team of Shankar Jaikishan composed the songs, lyrics were written by Shailendra and Hasrat Jaipuri, including "O Basanti Pawan Pagal", "Aa Ab Laut Chalen", and "Hothon Pe Sacchai Rehti Hai".

The outdoor shooting with the marble rock background is done in Bhedaghat in Madhya Pradesh.

== Plot ==
Raju (Raj Kapoor) is a poor, friendly orphan who wins his bread by singing songs. One day, he sees an injured man and helps him. Later, he is kidnapped by a few bandits who mistake him to be an undercover policeman. It then turns out that the injured man he helped is the leader (Sardar) of this gang. The Sardar takes good care of Raju and treats him with honour. Sardar's daughter Kammo (Padmini) falls in love with Raju. Kammo and Sardar convince Raju that they are good bandits who are making sure that wealth is equally distributed amongst people.

On one of the lootings, Raju witnesses the murder of a newlywed couple. He decides to go to the police and leaves the gang. One of the bandits, Raka (Pran), kills the Sardar and takes over, captures Raju; and tries to forcibly marry Kammo. Raju eloped and tells all the truth to the police, they decide to confront and kill the bandits. Raju begs the police to not kill them but is shunned. Raju is then posed in a dilemma of what to do and finds himself helpless when he sees police stooping just as low to stop crime. He then returns to the colony of dacoits to convince them to surrender to the police in order to ensure good and respectful life to their family, especially their children.

This movie was inspired by initiatives of Vinoba Bhave and Jayaprakash Narayan, on their call, hundreds of dacoits surrendered to police and mainstreamed to the society at large.

== Cast ==
- Raj Kapoor as Raju
- Padmini as Kammo
- Pran as Raka
- Chanchal as Bijli
- Lalita Pawar as Mirabai
- Raj Mehra as Police Superintendent
- Ramayan Tiwari as Mirabai's Husband
- Nana Palsikar as Tau
- Nayampalli as Sardar
- Salochana Chatterjee as Police Superintendent's wife
- Vishwa Mehra as Bhimu
- Baboo Rao
- S.K.Singh
- Rattan Gaurang
- Chang
- Mohamed Ali
- Anwari Bai
- Sadhana
- Azim
- Master Amar
- Moolchand as Groom's father

== Music ==
Composed by Shankar Jaikishan, lyrics by Shailendra and Hasrat Jaipuri.

No.	Title	Singer(s)	Length
1.	"Mera Naam Raju"	Mukesh	03:10
2.	"Kya Hua, Yeh Mujhe Kya Hua"	Lata Mangeshkar, Asha Bhosle
3.	"Jis Desh Mein Ganga Behti Hai"	Mukesh	04:13
4.	"Ho Maine Pyar Kiya"	Lata Mangeshkar
5.	"Hum Bhi Hain, Tum Bhi Ho"	Lata Mangeshkar, Geeta Dutt, Mukesh, Manna Dey, Mahendra Kapoor	07:35
6.	"Begaane Shaadi Mein Abdullah Diwana"	Lata Mangeshkar, Mukesh	03:29
7.	"O Basanti, Pawan Pagal" (Raga Basant Mukhari)	Lata Mangeshkar	03:52
8.	"Pyar Kar Le"	Mukesh
9.	"Aa Ab Laut Chalen"	Lata Mangeshkar, Mukesh	04:15

== Awards ==
The film won many prestigious awards at National Film Awards and Filmfare Awards. The film stood out at the 9th Filmfare Awards function by winning the most (four) awards in various categories from eight nominations.

9th Filmfare Awards:

Won

- Best Film – Raj Kapoor
- Best Actor – Raj Kapoor
- Best Editing – G.G. Mayekar
- Best Art Direction – M. R. Acharekar

Nominated

- Best Director – Radhu Karmakar
- Best Actress – Padmini
- Best Supporting Actor – Pran
- Best Music Director – Shankar–Jaikishan
- Best Lyricist – Shailendra for "Hothon Pe Sacchai"
- Best Male Playback Singer – Mukesh for "Hothon Pe Sacchai"

National Film Awards:

- 1960: Certificate of Merit for Best Feature Film in Hindi
