= Sangam (1964 Hindi film) =

1964 film by Raj Kapoor

- Theatrical release poster
- Directed by: Raj Kapoor
- Written by: Inder Raj Anand
- Produced by: Raj Kapoor
- Starring: Raj Kapoor; Vyjayanthimala; Rajendra Kumar
- Cinematography: Radhu Karmakar
- Edited by: Raj Kapoor
- Music by: Shankar–Jaikishan
- Production companies: Mehboob Studio; Filmistan
- Distributed by: R. K. Films
- Release date: 18 June 1964
- Running time: 238 minutes
- Country: India
- Language: Hindi
- Box office: 8 Crore

Sangam (transl. Confluence) is a 1964 Indian romantic musical drama film directed, produced and edited by Raj Kapoor at R. K. Studios, written by Inder Raj Anand, and distributed by R. K. Films with Mehboob Studio and Filmistan. It stars Raj Kapoor, Vyjayanthimala and Rajendra Kumar in lead roles, along with Iftekhar, Raj Mehra, Nana Palsikar, Lalita Pawar, Achala Sachdev, Hari Shivdasani in supporting roles. It tells the story of a pilot Sundar (Kapoor), who upon returning home from war after being assumed dead, weds the woman Radha (Vyjayanthimala) he had long loved, unaware that she had been planning to marry his best friend Gopal (Kumar).

Sangam was the first Indian film to be exclusively shot abroad on locations including London, Paris and Switzerland, and was also among the most expensive film of its time with the longest runtime for an Indian film up to that time. The film explores themes of love, loyalty, sacrifice, and the consequences of choices made in relationships. It portrays the conflicts and emotional turmoil faced by the characters as they navigate their complicated circumstances. The film was considered bold and much ahead of its time due to its storyline and characterizations. All these things immensely contributed to the box office success of the film.

Sangam released on 18 June 1964. It emerged as a major commercial success, grossing ₹8 crore worldwide, ranking as the highest-grossing Hindi film of the year, and the second highest-grossing film of the decade behind Mughal-E-Azam (1960).

Internationally, the film was released in the Soviet Union in 1964. It inspired Michael Bay's war film Pearl Harbor (2001) and was remade in Telugu and Kannada languages as Swapna (1981) by Dasari Narayana Rao.

== Plot ==
Sundar, Radha and Gopal have been friends since childhood. As they grow into adults, Sundar develops an obsessive romantic attraction to Radha; for him, she is the only woman in the world. However, Radha prefers Gopal, who is also in love with her, and systematically resists Sundar's advances. Matching Sundar's great love for Radha is his unswerving devotion to his friendship with Gopal. Sundar confides his feelings for Radha to Gopal, who decides to sacrifice his love for his friend's sake.

Eventually, Sundar enlists in the Indian Air Force and is assigned a dangerous mission in Kashmir, delivering items to soldiers fighting there. Before leaving, he extracts a promise from Gopal, whom he trusts implicitly, never to let any man come between Radha and himself while he is away. Sundar subsequently completes his mission, but his aircraft is shot down and he is listed as killed in action and presumed dead. For his bravery, he is awarded the Param Vir Chakra. The news saddens Radha and Gopal, but they are nonetheless now free to profess their love for one another. Among other expressions of love, Gopal writes her an unsigned love letter that touches her and which she hides away. Just when they begin taking steps to be married, Sundar returns, safe and sound. The self-effacing Gopal sacrifices his love once more, stepping back into the shadows and watching as the reborn Sundar resumes his wooing of Radha. Before Sundar enlisted, Radha's parents did not like him, but after he was awarded the Param Vir Chakra, they happily marry their daughter to him.

After the couple returns from an extended European honeymoon, Sundar is deliriously happy, as his life's dream has been realised. Radha is resolved to be faithful to her husband and to put Gopal out of her mind, privately asking him to stay away from her and Sundar because of the torture his presence causes her. Sundar's devotion to Gopal, however, is such that he constantly tries to draw him into their lives, much to Radha's chagrin. The perfection of their marital bliss is, however, shattered when Sundar accidentally discovers the unsigned love letter Gopal had written to Radha. An enraged Sundar pulls a pistol on his wife and demands she divulge the name of her supposed lover, threatening to kill the man, but she refuses.

In the days that follow, Sundar becomes consumed with discovering the identity of the letter's author. Radha's life becomes miserable, lived out against the incessant drama of Sundar's jealousy, threats, anger, and fixation with the letter. Eventually unable to bear the wretchedness of her existence with Sundar any further, she flees to Gopal for help. Sundar takes the same route, unaware that Radha has gone to Gopal's house. There, matters come to a head. The overwrought Gopal admits his authorship of the infamous letter to Radha, an admission that almost destroys his friend. Sundar asks Gopal why he sacrificed his love for his sake, admitting that he would have happily done the same for him. Radha, meanwhile, chastises the two men for not ever taking her feelings into consideration through the whole situation, and only focussing on their friendship. Gopal, perceiving no exit from the impasse at which the three have arrived, kills himself with Sundar's pistol. Radha and Sundar are finally reunited but in mourning.

== Cast ==
- Raj Kapoor as Flight Lt. Sundar Khanna
- Vyjayanthimala as Radha Mehra
- Rajendra Kumar as Magistrate Gopal Verma
- Iftekhar as IAF Officer
- Raj Mehra as Judge Mehra
- Nana Palsikar as Nathu
- Lalita Pawar as Mrs. Verma
- Hari Shivdasani as Radha's father
- Achala Sachdev as Radha's mother

== Production ==
=== Development ===
In the late 1940s, Raj Kapoor planned to launch a film under the title of Gharonda with Dilip Kumar, Nargis and himself in the lead playing the central characters. The story was penned by Inder Raj Anand during the making of Kapoor's first directorial film, Aag (1948). However, the film was postponed for several reasons and was in development hell until 1962, when it was titled as Sangam, with new cast and crew.

=== Casting ===
Initially, Kapoor approached Dilip Kumar to play the role of Gopal Verma. Kumar agreed to play either one of the two male roles, on the condition that he be given the right to edit the final copy of the film. Since Kapoor could not accept Kumar's condition, he then approached Dev Anand and offered him the choice of either one of the male leads. Anand also declined the film, citing call sheet problems as the reason. Raj Kapoor then offered the role to Uttam Kumar, but he too declined the offer. The role was finally given to Rajendra Kumar.

=== Filming ===
During filming, Raj Kapoor took the help of the Indian Air Force in the shooting of the Air Force scenes. This was also Raj Kapoor's first complete film in colour.

== Soundtrack ==
The film's soundtrack was composed by Shankar–Jaikishan, with lyrics penned by Shailendra and Hasrat Jaipuri. It was the best-selling Hindi film album of the 1960s.

- "Bol Radha Bol" was listed at #1 on Binaca Geetmala annual list 1964
- "Yeh Mera Prem Patra" was listed at #2 on Binaca Geetmala annual list 1964
- "Main Kya Karoon Ram" was listed at #10 on Binaca Geetmala annual list 1964
- "Dost Dost Na Raha" was listed at #12 on Binaca Geetmala annual list 1964

| # | Title | Singer(s) | Lyricist | Raga | Duration |
|---|---|---|---|---|---|
| 1 | "Bol Radha Bol" (Alternate title: "Mere Man Ki Ganga") | Vyjayanthimala, Mukesh | Shailendra | | 04:39 |
| 2 | "Dost Dost Na Raha" | Mukesh | Shailendra | Shivaranjani | 05:51 |
| 3 | "Har Dil Jo Pyaar Karega" | Lata Mangeshkar, Mukesh, Mahendra Kapoor | Shailendra | | 04:45 |
| 4 | "O Mere Sanam" | Lata Mangeshkar, Mukesh | Shailendra | Shivaranjani | 04:13 |
| 5 | "O Mehbooba" | Mukesh | Hasrat Jaipuri | | 04:59 |
| 6 | "Yeh Mera Prem Patra" | Mohammad Rafi, Lata Mangeshkar, Vyjayanthimala | Hasrat Jaipuri | Alhaiya Bilaval | 04:25 |
| 7 | "Main Kya Karoon Ram" | Lata Mangeshkar | Hasrat Jaipuri | | 03:45 |
| 8 | "Ich Liebe Dich (I Love You)" | Vivian Lobo | | | 02:16 |

== Reception ==
Widely anticipated before release owing to its scale, cast and music, Sangam emerged an All Time Blockbuster at the box office as well the second biggest-earner ever, behind Mughal-E-Azam. It ran for almost one year in Kolkata's famous Orient cinema and completed 175 days in other notable cinemas of the city, Priya and Darpan.

It further solidified Rajendra Kumar's Superstar status and was also one of the last major hits of Raj Kapoor's career as a lead. Today, Sangam is considered a cult classic and one of the best romantic films ever made in Hindi cinema.

== Awards ==
| Award | Category | Nominee | Outcome | Note | Ref. |
|---|---|---|---|---|---|
| Bengal Film Journalists' Association Awards | Best Indian Films | Raj Kapoor | Won | On behalf of R. K. Films | |
| Bengal Film Journalists' Association Awards | Best Director | Raj Kapoor | Won | | |
| Bengal Film Journalists' Association Awards | Best Editing | Raj Kapoor | Won | | |
| Bengal Film Journalists' Association Awards | Best Art Direction | M. R. Acharekar | Won | | |
| Bengal Film Journalists' Association Awards | Best Cinematography | Radhu Karmakar | Won | | |
| Bengal Film Journalists' Association Awards | Best Audiography | Allauddin Khan Qureshi | Won | | |
| 12th Filmfare Awards | Best Film | Raj Kapoor | Nominated | On behalf of R. K. Films | |
| 12th Filmfare Awards | Best Director | Raj Kapoor | Won | | |
| 12th Filmfare Awards | Best Actor | Raj Kapoor | Nominated | | |
| 12th Filmfare Awards | Best Actress | Vyjayanthimala | Won | | |
| 12th Filmfare Awards | Best Supporting Actor | Rajendra Kumar | Nominated | | |
| 12th Filmfare Awards | Best Story | Inder Raj Anand | Nominated | | |
| 12th Filmfare Awards | Best Music Director | Shankar-Jaikishan | Nominated | | |
| 12th Filmfare Awards | Best Lyricist | Shailendra for "Dost Dost Na Raha" | Nominated | | |
| 12th Filmfare Awards | Best Male Playback Singer | Mukesh for "Dost Dost Na Raha" | Nominated | | |
| 12th Filmfare Awards | Best Editing | Raj Kapoor | Won | | |
| 12th Filmfare Awards | Best Sound Design | Allauddin Khan Qureshi | Won | | |

== See also ==
- Kashmir conflict and Indo-Pakistani war of 1947–1948, depicted in the film
