= Radhu Karmakar =

Indian cinematographer and director from 20th century

Radhu Karmakar (1919 - 5 October 1993) was an Indian cinematographer and director in Hindi cinema from the 1940s to 1990s. He worked extensively with director-actor Raj Kapoor on his films and for his R. K. Studio. Starting with Awaara (1951), he shot all of Kapoor's subsequent films for four decades, till his last, Ram Teri Ganga Maili (1985).

He even directed a film, Jis Desh Men Ganga Behti Hai (1960), which was produced by Raj Kapoor, and with Kapoor himself and Padmini as leads. The film won Filmfare Award for Best Film while Karmakar won a nomination for Best Director Award at the 9th Filmfare Awards. At the 8th National Film Awards the film also won Certificate of Merit in the Best Feature Film in Hindi category.

At the 18th National Film Awards, he won the award for National Film Award for Best Cinematography for Mera Naam Joker. He won the Filmfare Award for Best Cinematographer four times: Shree 420 (1957), Mera Naam Joker (1972), Satyam Shivam Sundaram (1979), and Henna (1992).

== Career ==
Karmakar start his film career in Calcutta with Kismat ki Dhani (1945) followed by Milan (1946) directed by Nitin Bose for Bombay Talkies. Though the film didn't perform well at box office, his night sequence photography and high contrast lighting got him acclaim. Soon he was chosen to shoot Raj Kapoor's Awaara (1951). This started a career long association lasting four decades, working on films, such as Shree 420 (1955), Sangam (1964), Mera Naam Joker (1970), Bobby (1973), Satyam Shivam Sundaram (1978), Prem Rog (1982), and Ram Teri Ganga Maili (1985). After Raj Kapoor's death in 1988, he continued working with R. K. Studio and shot Henna (1991), a project he started shooting and which was later completed by his son Randhir Kapoor.

== Early life ==
Born in Bikrampur, now in Munshiganj District, near present-day Dhaka, Bangladesh in a Bengali Karmakar family of goldsmiths, the profession which did not interest him much apart from his photography. Karmakar married Baani Rai, the daughter of businessman Brojendrolal Rai, and moved to Calcutta. Baani Karmakar was the youngest among her seven siblings. Radhu Karmakar and his family resided in Calcutta until 1951 when he started working with Raj Kapoor in his film Awaara (1951). He worked initially on director Nitin Bose's Milan (1946) soon after Kismat ki Dhani (1945). Raj Kapoor found Karmakar's work commendable when he saw his night sequence photography and high contrast lighting in Milan (1946). Karmakar's family soon moved to Bombay.

== Family ==
Wife - Late Mrs Baani Karmakar
Sons - Krishna Gopal Karmakar and Brojo Gopal Karmakar
Daughters - Sudevi Karmakar, Radha Banerjee, Meera Choudhuri
Grandchildren - Shomita Pandey, Rinky Karmakar, Siddharth Karmakar, Shubhankar Banerjee, Gaurang Karmakar, Anuradha Karmakar, Priyanka Choudhuri, Keshub Karmakar, Rudraraj Karmakar
Great grand daughter- Dr.Tushita Pandey

== Death ==
Karmakar died in a car accident on the Bombay Pune Road while driving back to Bombay. He died on 5 October 1993. At the 42nd National Film Awards of 1995, he was posthumously given a Special Jury Award for Param Vir Chakra and "In appreciation of a lifetime achievement in creating some of the most memorable moments in Indian film history."

His autobiography, Radhu Karmakar: The Painter of Lights, was published posthumously in 2005.

== Filmography ==
=== Director ===
- Jis Desh Men Ganga Behti Hai (1960)

=== Cinematographer ===
- Kismat Ki Dhani (1945)
- Jwar Bhata (1944)
- Milan (1946)
- Naukadubi (1947)
- Mashal (1950)
- Samar (1950)
- Awaara (1951)
- Jagte Raho (1956)
- Shree 420 (1955)
- Sangam (1964)
- Aman (1967)
- Sapnon Ka Saudagar (1968)
- Mera Naam Joker (1970)
- Be-Imaan (1972)
- Bobby (1973)
- Sanyasi (1975)
- Dhoop Chhaon (1977)
- Satyam Shivam Sundaram (1978)
- Love Story (1981)
- Prem Rog (1982)
- Ram Teri Ganga Maili (1985)
- Adventures of Tarzan (1985)
- Dance Dance (1987)
- Commando (1988)
- Henna (1991)
- Param Vir Chakra (1995)

== Bibliography ==
- Radhu Karmarkar (2005). Radhu Karmakar: The Painter of Lights. Prafulla. ISBN 978-81-903588-0-4.
- Radhu Karmakar (2010). Camera: Meri Teesari Ankh (Hindi). Rajkamal Prakashan. ISBN 9788126719624.
