= Shree 420 =

1955 Indian film by Raj Kapoor

- Original poster
- Directed by: Raj Kapoor
- Screenplay by: Khwaja Ahmad Abbas; V.P. Sathe
- Story by: Khwaja Ahmad Abbas
- Produced by: Raj Kapoor
- Starring: Raj Kapoor; Nargis; Nadira
- Cinematography: Radhu Karmakar
- Edited by: G.G. Mayekar
- Music by: Shankar–Jaikishan
- Release date: 6 September 1955
- Running time: 168 minutes
- Country: India
- Language: Hindi
- Box office: ₹3.9 crore

Shree 420 (also spelled as Shri 420; transl. Mr. 420) is a 1955 Indian Hindi comedy-drama film directed and produced by Raj Kapoor from a story written by Khwaja Ahmad Abbas whose use of Shree with the negative connotations of 420 caused controversy. The film stars Nargis, Nadira, and Kapoor. The number 420 refers to Section 420 of the Indian Penal Code, which prescribes the punishment for the offence of fraud; hence, "Mr. 420" is a derogatory term for a fraudster. The film centers on Raj Kapoor, a poor but educated orphan who comes to Bombay with dreams of success. Kapoor's character is influenced by Charlie Chaplin's "little tramp", much like Kapoor's character in his 1951 Awaara. The music was composed by the team of Shankar Jaikishan, and the lyrics were penned by Shailendra and Hasrat Jaipuri.

Shree 420 was the highest-grossing Indian film of 1955, the highest grossing Indian film of all time at the time of its release and the song "Mera Joota Hai Japani" ("My Shoes are Japanese"), sung by Mukesh, became popular and a patriotic symbol of the newly independent India. The movie had numerous other hit songs like "Pyar Hua Iqrar Hua", a duet with Nargis sung in monsoon old Bombay.

== Plot ==
Raj (Raj Kapoor), a country boy from Allahabad, travels to the big city, Bombay, by walking, to earn a living. He falls in love with the poor but virtuous Vidya (Nargis), but is soon seduced by the riches of a freewheeling and unethical lifestyle presented to him by an unscrupulous and dishonest businessman, Seth Sonachand Dharmanand (Nemo) and the sultry temptress Maya (Nadira). He eventually becomes a confidence trickster, or "420," who even cheats in card gambling. Vidya tries hard to make Raj a good man, but fails.

Meanwhile, Sonachand comes up with a Ponzi scheme to exploit poor people, whereby he promises permanent homes to them at just Rs. 100. The scheme pays off, as people start hoarding money for a home, even at the cost of other important things. Vidya's contempt for Raj increases even more. Raj becomes wealthy but soon realizes that he paid a very high price for it. When Raj discovers that Sonachand has no plans to fulfill his promises, he decides to make wrongs right.

Raj takes all the bond papers of the people's homes and tries to flee Sonachand's home, only to be caught by Sonachand and his cronies. In a scuffle that occurs, Sonachand shoots Raj and he falls unconscious. When people hear the shooting, they come and see Raj nearly dead. Sonachand tells the police that Raj was trying to flee after stealing money from his safe, hence Sonachand shot him.

Upon this, the "dead" Raj springs back to life and, using pure logic, proves Sonachand's guilt. Sonachand and his partners are arrested, while Vidya happily forgives Raj. The film ends with Raj saying "Yeh 420 Nahin, Shree 420 Hain" ("These are not simply con men, they are respectable con men").

== Cast ==
Cast in order of the opening credits of the film

- Nargis as Vidya
- Nadira as Maya
- Raj Kapoor as Ranbir Raj / Rajkumar Saxena
- Nemo as Seth Sonachand Dharmanand
- Lalita Pawar as Ganga Mai
- M. Kumar as Beggar
- Indira Billi as Seth Sonachand Dharmanand's daughter
- Hari Shivdasani as Philachand
- Nana Palsikar
- Bhudo Advani as Dharmanand's valet
- Pessi Patel as Pawn Shop Owner
- Ramesh Sinha as Street Dweller
- Rashid Khan as Raddiwala
- Jaikishan as Johny
- Sheila Vaaz as dancer
- S. P. Berry
- Kathana as Customer
- Satyanarayan
- Shailendra lyricist
- Rajoo as young boy
- Mansaram
- Iftikhar as Police Inspector
- Uma Devi as Maya's Neighbor
- Anwari
- Mirajkar as Inspector
- Bhagwandas
- Bishamber

== Allusions ==
The title refers to section 420 of the Indian penal code, where crimes of theft and deception are punished, which relates to the troubles of the main character.

In Sanskrit, the name of the main character, "Vidya", means knowledge, while "Maya" means Illusion.

The title of one of the songs in the movie is "Ramaiya Vastavaiya" is in Telugu, which means "Ramaiya, come quickly". Apart from that, the rest of the song's lyrics (and the film) are in Hindi.

At the beginning of the movie, the main protagonist explains to a policeman that one needs to stand on one's head to make sense of this world. He mentions that this is the reason why even great leaders stand on their heads. This is an allusion to several political leaders of that time who enjoyed practicing the Shirshasana, a yoga asana where one stands on his head. In his autobiography, Nehru described that the shirshasana was his favorite pose, and how he often did the shirshasana in jail, too.

== Production ==
"I had to give a shot and it was raining that day. It was difficult for the crew to make me prepare for the shot. I had just to walk without any expression. It was Nargis who came up with the idea to offer me chocolate to get the shot done. In that sense, I started taking bribes when I was two-year-old."

— Rishi Kapoor, January 20, 2017

Raj Kapoor's real-life children Randhir, Ritu and Rishi were featured in the song "Pyar Hua Iqrar Hua", Rishi revealed that Nargis bribed him with chocolate and recalled it in a 2017 interview.

== Reception ==
The song "Mera Joota Hai Japani", in which the singer asserts his pride in being an Indian, despite his clothes being from other countries, became, and remains, a patriotic favourite among many Indians. It is often referenced, including in an acceptance speech at the Frankfurt Book Fair in 2006 by Bengali author Mahasweta Devi.

The film proved to be popular in other countries, including the Soviet Union, Romania, and Israel. In Russia, it was said that Raj Kapoor was as popular as Jawaharlal Nehru, due to the success of Awaara and Shree 420. In Israel, the song "Ichak Dana Beechak Dana" (transliterated as "Ichikidana") became popular and was re-recorded by local singer Naim Rajuan.

In 2023, Time Out ranked it #23 on its list of the "100 Best Bollywood Movies."

=== Box office ===
At the Indian box office in 1955, the film grossed ₹3.9 crore (equivalent to ₹461 crore or US$48 million in 2026), with a net income of ₹2 crore (equivalent to ₹237 crore or US$25 million in 2026). This record was beaten two years later by Mother India in 1957.

It was released in the Soviet Union in 1956, coming second on the Soviet box office charts that year. Despite being imported at an unusually high price, it was the most successful foreign film of the year at the Soviet box office, drawing an audience of 35 million viewers.

The song Pyar Hua Iqrar Hua is also very famous. It has become a symbol of romance, and was used many times, notably for advertising.

Worldwide gross revenue
Territory	Gross	Adjusted gross	Footfalls
Domestic (India)	₹3.9 crore ($8.19 million) (Note: 4.7619 Indian rupees per US dollar from 1950 to 1965) in 1955	$98 million (₹490 crore)	35,000,000+
Overseas (Soviet Union)	8.75 million Rbls (Note: 35 million Soviet tickets sold, average ticket price of 25 kopecks) ($2.19 million) (Note: 4 Rbls per US dollar from 1950 to 1960) (₹1.04 crore)	$26 million (₹128 crore)	35,000,000
Worldwide	₹4.94 crore ($10.38 million)	₹618 crore ($92 million)	70,000,000+

== Soundtrack ==
The song "Mera Joota Hai Japani" was reused in the 2016 American English-language film Deadpool.

No.	Title	Lyrics	Singer(s)	Length
1.	"Dil Ka Haal Sune Dilwaala"	Shailendra	Manna Dey	5:36
2.	"Mera Juta Hai Japani" (Raga Bhairavi)	Shailendra	Mukesh	4:33
3.	"Mud Mud Ke Na Dekh"	Shailendra	Manna Dey, Asha Bhosle	6:34
4.	"Pyar Hua Iqrar Hua" (Raga Bhairavi, with Kirwani)	Shailendra	Lata Mangeshkar, Manna Dey	4:22
5.	"Ramaiya Vastavaiya" (Raga Bhairavi)	Shailendra	Lata Mangeshkar, Mohammed Rafi, Mukesh	6:10
6.	"Ichak Dana Beechak Dana"	Hasrat Jaipuri	Lata Mangeshkar, Mukesh	5:08
7.	"O Janewale"	Hasrat Jaipuri	Lata Mangeshkar	2:20
8.	"Sham Gayi Raat Aayi"	Shailendra	Lata Mangeshkar	4:00

== Awards ==
- 1956: Filmfare Awards
  - Best Cinematographer: Radhu Karmakar
  - Best Editing: G.G. Mayekar
- National Film Awards
  - 1956: Certificate of Merit for the Second Best Feature Film in Hindi
  - Russian Audience Heart Award Awarded to Raj Kapoor (the director, producer and actor in the film) decades later to celebrate the legacy and ongoing popularity of Shree 420 and Awaara in Russia

== See also ==
- Raju Ban Gaya Gentleman
