= Shankar–Jaikishan =

Indian film music composer duo

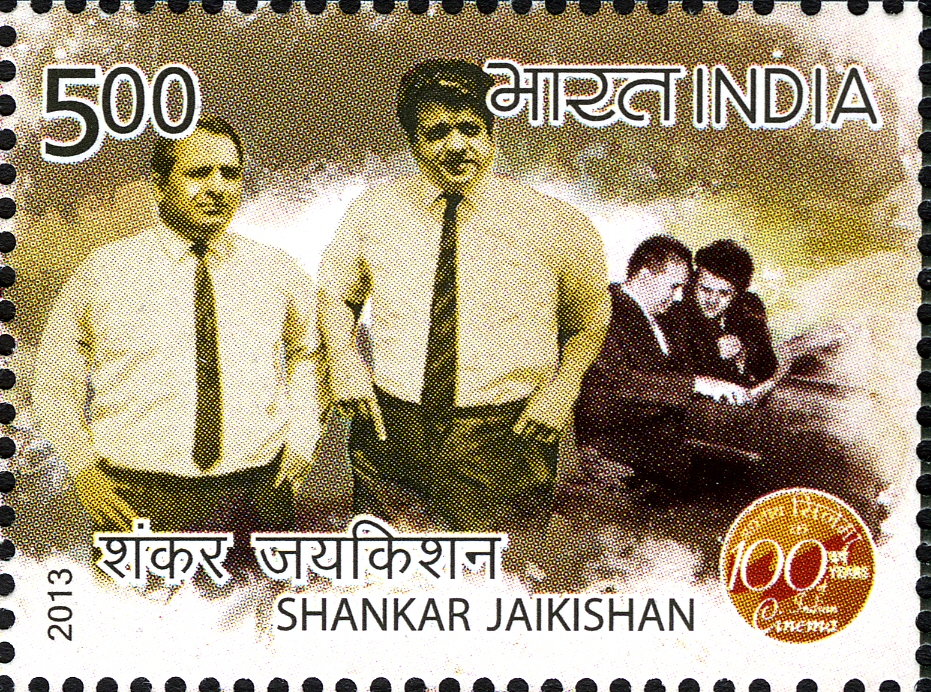
- Shankar (left) and Jaikishan (right) on a 2013 stamp of India

Background information
- Also known as: S–J
- Genres: Film score, Indian classical music, Fusion music, Indo jazz
- Occupation: Film Music director
- Website: Official website

Shankar–Jaikishan, consisting of Shankar Singh Ram Singh Raghuvanshi (15 October 1922 - 26 April 1987, aged 64) and Jaikishan Dayabhai Panchal (4 November 1929 - 12 September 1971, aged 41), also known as S-J, were an Indian composer duo of the Hindi film industry, who worked together from 1949 to 1971. They are widely considered to be the greatest music composers of the Hindi film industry. From 1949 until Jaikishan's death in 1971, they composed musical scores for 136 films, introducing a new level of orchestral richness in film music. S-J collaborated with legendary singers such as Mukesh (singer), Mohammed Rafi, Manna Dey, Kishore Kumar, Talat Mahmood, Lata Mangeshkar, Suman Kalyanpur, Asha Bhosle and Sharda. They also worked extensively with lyricists Shailendra and Hasrat Jaipuri, with whom they created some of the most memorable songs in their career.

Along with other artists, Shankar–Jaikishan composed timeless melodies during the 1950s, 1960s, and early 1970s. Their best work was noted for being raga-based while maintaining both melodic charm and orchestral richness.

Although primarily active in the Hindi film industry as a composer duo, they strongly influenced the next generation of Indian music directors. Their songs remain popular in India and abroad, and continue to inspire composers decades after their deaths.

After Jaikishan's death in 1971, Shankar continued working as a music director and composed music for 43 films until his death in 1987. During this solo period, he continued to be credited under the name "Shankar–Jaikishan".

== Early life ==
=== Shankar ===
Shankar
- Born: Shankar Singh Ram Singh Raghuvanshi; 15 October 1922; Hyderabad Deccan, Hyderabad State (present-day Telangana)
- Died: 26 April 1987 (aged 64) Bombay, Maharashtra, India
- Years active: 1949–1987

Shankar Singh Ram Singh Raghuvanshi (15 October 1922 – 26 April 1987) was from Hyderabad, British India. During his formative years, Shankar played the tabla and learned the art formally from Baba Nasir Khansahib. For many years, Shankar studied as a disciple of the legendary composer Khawaja Khurshid Anwar, in whose orchestra he performed.

Shankar started his career with a theater group run by Satyanarayan and Hemawati, before shifting to Prithvi Theatre where he played tabla and performed some minor roles in plays. It was at Prithvi Theatre that he learnt to play and mastered several other instruments like Sitar, Accordion and Piano. Besides his work at Prithvi Theatre, he also started working as an assistant to the leading composer duo of Husnlal Bhagatram and nurtured the ambition of becoming an independent music director.

=== Jaikishan ===
Jaikishan
- Born: Jaikishan Dayabhai Panchal; 4 November 1929; Vansda, Bansda, Bombay Presidency, British India (present-day Gujarat)
- Died: 12 September 1971 (aged 41) Bombay, Maharashtra, India
- Years active: 1949 – 1971

Jaikishan Dayabhai Panchal (4 November 1929 – 12 September 1971) was born to Dahyabhai Panchal and his wife. As a child he lived in Bansda (Vansada), a town in the present-day state of Gujarat. Jaikishan was adept at playing the harmonium. Subsequently, he obtained his musical lessons from Sangeet Visharad Wadilalji and later from Prem Shankar Nayak. After moving to Mumbai, he became a disciple of Vinayak Tambe.

=== Formation of the composer duo ===
Apart from working at Prithvi Theatre, Shankar used to frequently visit the office of a Gujarati director, Chandravadan Bhatt, who had promised Shankar a break as composer when he produced a film. It was outside the office of Bhatt that Shankar saw Jaikishan a number of times. He started a conversation one day and discovered that Jaikishan was a harmonium player, and also visiting the same producer in search of work. Shankar later recollected that they developed a liking for each other and it was he who then and there assured Jaikishan of the job of a harmonium player at Prithvi Theatre (without asking Prithviraj Kapoor, fondly referred to as 'Papaji'). Papaji honoured Shankar's selection and gladly accepted Jaikishan as a harmonium player at Prithvi. Soon, the two developed a close friendship to the extent that the people started referring to them 'Ram-Lakshman' and by several similar-meaning nicknames. Apart from following their musical pursuits, they also used to play significant roles in various plays including the famous play Pathan.

While working in Prithvi Theatre, Shankar and Jaikishan used to compose tunes and were in touch with Raj Kapoor, who was working as an assistant to the famous director Kidar Sharma and was aspiring to be an actor/director. Thus, the three had met at Prithvi Theatre.

== Music career ==
=== Breakthrough and rise to prominence (1949–1959) ===
Shankar-Jaikishan began their career in 1949 with Raj Kapoor's romantic drama Barsaat. The film proved to be an All Time Blockbuster at the box office and its soundtrack album a major success which not only established Shankar-Jaikishan, but also made Lata Mangeshkar the leading playback singer of Bollywood as songs sung by her, such as "Hawa Mein Udta Jaye, "Jiya Beqarar Hai", "Barsaat Mein Humse Mile" proved to be superhits. The soundtrack was listed by Planet Bollywood at number 1 on their list of the 100 Greatest Bollywood Soundtracks. Rakesh Budhu of Planet Bollywood gave 10 stars stating, "Barsaat is ideally one of Hindi cinema's best soundtracks". They began the new decade with another Raj Kapoor film Awaara (1951), which again proved to be a huge commercial success and its soundtrack the best-selling Hindi film album of the 1950s with a number of chartbuster songs, including "Hum Tujhse Mohabbat Kar Ke", "Ghar Aaya Mera Pardesi" and "Awaara Hoon", which made Mukesh the playback voice for Kapoor and one of the leading playback singers of his time along with Mohammed Rafi. From 1952 to 1954, they composed for films like Daag (1952), Patita (1953), Aah (1953) and Boot Polish (1954), all of which had notable numbers, such as "Ae Mere Dil Kahin Aur Chal" (Daag), “Yaad Kiya Dil Ne” (Patita), "Raja Ki Aayegi Baaraat" (Aah) and "Nanhe Munne Bachche Teri Mutthi Mein Kya Hai" (Boot Polish).

Shankar-Jaikishan hit the big league in 1955 with Shree 420 and Seema, both of which had songs written by Shailendra and Hasrat Jaipuri. Songs from both the films "Mera Joota Hai Japani", "Pyar Hua Iqrar Hua", "Ichak Dana Beechak Dana", "Mud Mud Ke Na Dekh" in the former and "Tu Pyar Ka Sagar Hai", "Kahaan Jaa Raha Hain", "Ye Duniya Gam Ka Mela Hai" in the latter proved to highly popular among the masses and played a major role in box office success of both the films. The following year, they composed for Raja Nawathe's Basant Bahar and Anant Thakur's Chori Chori. Both the films were received well by critics as well as audience and their success was attributed to melodious songs by the duo many of which found a spot in the year-end annual list of Binaca Geetmala, such as "Badi Der Bhayee", a solo by Rafi, "Panchhi Banoon, Udti Phiroon", a solo by Mangeshkar, "Aaja Sanam Madhur Chandni Mein Hum Tum Mile", "Yeh Raat Bheegi Bheegi" and "Nain Mile Chain Kahan", all three duets by Mangeshkar and Manna Dey. Chori Chori also won Shankar-Jaikishan their first Filmfare Award for Best Music Director. In the late-1950s, they delivered back-to-back musical hits with Bimal Roy's Yahudi (1958), L. V. Prasad's Chhoti Bahen (1959) and Hrishikesh Mukherjee's Anari (1959), all three of which were critically and commercially successful, especially Anari which emerged as the highest-earning film of 1959 and one of the best-selling Hindi film album of the decade. It also won Shankar-Jaikishan their second Filmfare Award for Best Music Director.

=== Continued success (1960–1969) ===
Shankar-Jaikishan began the 1960s with films, such as Dil Apna Aur Preet Parai and Jis Desh Mein Ganga Behti Hai. Commercially, both the films emerged huge hits and their songs proved chartbuster, which were - "Ajeeb Dastan Hai Yeh" and "Dil Apna Aur Preet Parai" (Dil Apna Aur Preet Parai), "Jis Desh Mein Ganga Behti Hai" and "Aa Ab Laut Chalen" (Jis Desh Mein Ganga Behti Hai). For Dil Apna Aur Preet Parai, Shankar-Jaikishan won their third Filmfare Award for Best Music Direction. From 1961 to 1963, they delivered a string of superhit songs like "Teri Pyari Pyari Soorat Ko" and "Ek Sawal Main Karoon" (Sasural), "Sau Saal Pehle" and "Jiya O Jiya" (Jab Pyar Kisi Se Hota Hai), "Dil Mera Ek Aas Ka Panchhi" and "Tum Roothi Raho" (Aas Ka Panchhi), "Chahe Koi Mujhe Junglee Kahe" and "Ehsaan Tera Hoga Mujh Par" (Junglee), "Tera Mera Pyaar Amar" and "Tujhe Jeevan Ki Dor Se" (Asli-Naqli), "Main Chali Main Chali" and "Aawaz Deke Humein Tum Bulao" (Professor), "Allah Jaane Kya Hoga Aage" and "Dil Mera Chup Chap Jala" (Hariyali Aur Rasta), "Mujhe Kitna Pyar Hai Tumse" and "Dil Tera Deewana Hai Sanam" (Dil Tera Deewana), "Ruk Ja Raat" and "Yaad Na Jaye Beete Dinon Ki" (Dil Ek Mandir). The soundtrack of Junglee proved to be one of the best-selling Hindi film albums of the 1960s and for their work in the romantic comedy Professor, Shankar-Jaikishan received their fourth Filmfare Award for Best Music Director.

Shankar-Jaikishan reached their peak in the mid-1960s with highly successful ventures, such as Ayee Milan Ki Bela (1964), Rajkumar (1964), April Fool (1964), Zindagi (1964), Sangam (1964), Arzoo (1965), Gumnaam (1965), Jaanwar (1965), Love In Tokyo (1966) and Suraj (1966). Most of the songs from these films - "Mere Man Ki Ganga Aur Tere Man Ki Jamuna Ka", Yeh Mera Prem Patra Padhkar", Tumhe Aur Kya Du Mai Dil Ke Sivaye", "Tum Kamsin Ho Nadan Ho", "Hum Pyar Ka Sauda", "Pehle Mile The Sapnon Mein", "Main Kya Karoon Ram", "Dost Dost Na Raha", "Lal Chhadi Maidan Khadi", "Tumse Achha Kaun Hai", "April Fool Banaya, To Unko Gussa Aaya", "Jaan Pehechan Ho", "Gumnaam Hai Koi", "Hum Kaale Hain To Kya Hua Dilwale Hain", "Aji Rooth Kar Ab Kahan Jaaiyega", "Ae Phoolon Ki Rani", "Love In Tokyo", "Baharon Phool Barsao" and "Titli Udi Ud Jo Chali", featured in the year-end annual list of Binaca Geetmala and for Suraj, Shankar-Jaikishan won their fifth Filmfare Award for Best Music Director. Also the music of Sangam, Arzoo and Suraj proved to be the top, eighth and thirteenth best-selling Bollywood albums of the decade, respectively.

From 1967 onwards, they began to face competition from new crop of composers, including Laxmikant–Pyarelal, Kalyanji–Anandji and R. D. Burman. Towards the end of the 1960s, their notable hits, included An Evening in Paris (1967), Shikar (1968), Brahmachari (1968), Kanyadaan (1968), Prince (1969) and Yakeen (1969), which had notable songs, such as "Aasman Se Aaya Farishta" and "Raat Ke Humsafar Thakke Ghar Ko Chale" (An Evening in Paris), "Jabse Lagi Tose Najariya, Nas Nas Mein Daude Hai" and "Parde Mein Rahne Do" (Shikar), "Dil Ke Jharokhe Mein" and "Aajkal Tere Mere Pyar Ke Charche" (Brahmachari), "Likhe Jo Khat Tujhe" and "Meri Zindagi Mein Aate" (Kanyadaan), "Badan Pe Sitare Lapete" and "Madhosh Hawa Matwali Fiza" (Prince), "Yakeen Karlo Mujhe Mohabbat Hai" and "Gar Tum Bhula Na Doge" (Yakeen). Their other hits songs from this period were - "Dooriyan Nazdikiyan Ban Gayi" and "Falsafa Pyar Ka Tum Kya Jano" (Duniya), "Kaun Hai Jo Sapnon Mein Aaya" and "Unse Mili Nazar Ke Mere Hosh Ud Gaye" (Jhuk Gaya Aasman), "Jhanak Jhanak Tori Baaje Payaliya" and "Gham Uthane Ke Liye Main To Jiye Jaunga" (Mere Huzoor), "Dekha Hai Teri Aankhon Mein" and "Main Kahin Kavi Na Ban Jaoon" (Pyar Hi Pyar). For Brahmachari, Shankar-Jaikishan won their sixth Filmfare Award for Best Music Director as well as their first BFJA Best Music Director Award (Hindi).

=== Jaikishan's death, downturn and further works (1970–1986) ===
In 1970, they composed for notable films, including Mera Naam Joker, Dharti, Pagla Kahin Ka, Tum Haseen Main Jawaan and Pehchan. However, with the exception of latter two, none of them did well commercially, but their soundtracks received acclaim and for Pehchan and Mera Naam Joker, Shankar-Jaikishan received their seventh and eighth Filmfare Award for Best Music Director, respectively. In 1971, they delivered music for Ramesh Sippy's romantic drama Andaz, which had Shammi Kapoor, Hema Malini, Rajesh Khanna and Simi Garewal in the lead roles. Upon release, Andaz emerged a superhit with its song, "Zindagi Ek Safar Hai Suhana", a solo by Kishore Kumar topping the year-end annual list of Binaca Geetmala. Andaz also proved to be one of the last films Shankar-Jaikishan worked on as Jaikishan died on 12 September 1971 due to Liver Cirrhosis. For the film, they won their second and last BFJA Best Music Director Award (Hindi). Their other memorable work that year was in Kal Aaj Aur Kal, which marked their final collaboration with R. K. Films. Two songs from the film "Aap Yahan Aaye Kisliye", "Tik Tik Tik Tik Chalti Jaye Ghadi" remain popular till date.

After Jaikishan's untimely demise, Shankar continued to compose under the name Shankar-Jaikishan and after few failures eventually saw musical blockbusters in Manoj Kumar starrers Be-Imaan (1972) and Sanyasi (1975), soundtracks of both of which were among the best-selling Hindi film albums of the 1970s with highly popular songs, "Jai Bolo Be-Imaan Ki" and "Patla Patla Reshmi Roomal" (Be-Imaan), "Chal Sanyasi Mandir Mein" and "Yeh Hai Geeta Ka Gyan" (Sanyasi). Also for Be-Imaan, Shankar-Jaikishan received their final Filmfare Award for Best Music Director. However, this success was short-lived as rest of the films they delivered music for in the latter-half of the 1970s and 1980s, such as Dhoop Chhaon (1977), Duniyadari (1977), Atmaram (1979), Garam Khoon (1980) and Papi Pet Ka Sawal Hai (1984), with the exception of Chorni (1982), sank without a trace. The last film Shankar worked on was the 1986 mythological drama film Krishna-Krishna, which did not performed well critically or commercially.

== Shankar's death ==
Shankar died on 26 April 1987. His death received little media coverage and his funeral was attended only by his family and some friends. The film industry was hardly present at his funeral, thus reinforcing the stereotype of its fickle-natured loyalties, when compared to Jaikishan's death in 1971, which drew the entire film industry. After Shankar died, the nearly 40 year old SJ banner came to an end, which was the end of what is widely regarded as the best music direction in Bollywood history.

Raj Kapoor later paid glowing tributes to Shankar in a televised interview. However, it was only after Raj Kapoor's own death in 1988 that the significance of his association with Shankar–Jaikishan was brought out in great detail.

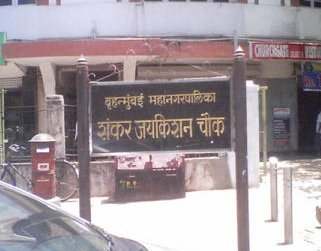
A prominent crossroad junction at Churchgate, Mumbai has been named after Shankar-Jaikishan.

Chandrakant Bhosle first noticed Shankar, as Shankar was popularly known among his friends, in Mumbai in 1945 when Shankarji arrived in Mumbai with ballet troupe of guru Krishnankutty and dancer Hemawati. Bhosle was a tabla player and had become closely associated with Shankar. He used to play rhythm in Shankar's orchestra from 1949 until Shankar's death. On the night of April 25, 1987, Shankar dropped Bhosle near Charni Road railway station where Bhosle stayed and drove off to his own residence at Churchgate. On 26 April Bhosle was, as usual, waiting for Shankar at around 10.00 a.m. to take him to the studio, but Shankar did not turn up so Bhosle went to the studio by taxi. All the musicians waited the whole day for Shankar in the studio but he did not turn up. The next day, Bhosle read the news of Shankar's death. Unfortunately, family members with whom Shankar was staying did not inform Bhosle, Raj Kapoor or anybody from the film fraternity about Shankar's death. It was Mr. Gokhale, who was once a cook in Shankarji's house, who later became Pujari in Gora Ram Mandir at Thakurdwar, Mumbai, who informed people that Shankarji was cremated hastily on the day of his death, without the knowledge of others.

== Composition style ==
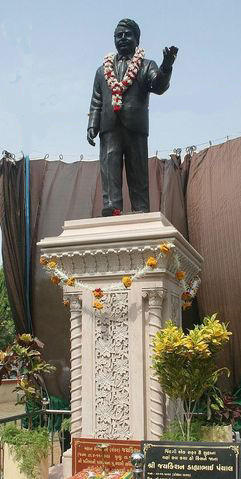
Statue of Jaikishan at Bansada near Valsad, Gujarat (Jaikishan's native town).

Shankar-Jaikishan's compositions broke new ground in Hindi film music. Apart from relying upon their knowledge of Indian classical music, they also employed western beats and orchestration. Shankar-Jaikishan were the pioneers in establishing the role of the orchestra in song compositions as a medium to express and enhance the meanings and feelings of songs rather than using it just as a `filler' as per the prevalent practice before their advent on the scene. They made use of the orchestra and musical instruments (often dozens or hundreds of them) in their songs which consisted of the following format: The song starts with a `prelude' (preparatory music to create and introduce the environment and mood for the beginning of the song), then the mukhda starts and is followed by 'interlude' containing music pieces on the orchestra. With very few exceptions ("Ye mera deewana pan hai" is a good example), they always used different interludes before each stanza. 'Multi-layered music studded with counter melodies' played by the orchestra accompanied while the 'mukhda' or the 'antara' of a song was being sung and finally came the `epilogue' – the music with which the song ended after the singer(s) had finished their singing.

Shankar-Jaikishan made a significant contribution in promoting Indian classical music throughout their career. It was their established practice to have at least one song in a movie based on semi-classical style. They also used the western classical-based waltz rhythm in a number of songs.

Shankar-Jaikishan gave a new style and meaning to the genre of sad songs by composing them on a fast tempo. Songs like "Zindagi Mein Hardam Rota Hi Raha" (Barsaat), "Tera Jana Dil Ke Armanon" (Anari), "Haye Tu Hi Gaya Mohe Bhool Re" (Kathputli), "Aye Mere Dil Kahin Aur Chal" (Daag) and "Andhe Jahan Ke Andhe Raate" (Patita) demonstrated this. The last two songs, along with many others (notably "Awaara Hoon" from the film Awaara), also demonstrate the composers’ use of musical instruments – a harmonium is used to produce the effect of a piano accordion.

SJ's 1968 Indo-jazz album, Raaga- Jazz Style.

Shankar Jaikishan made a major contribution towards the development of jazz music in India and the new genre Indo jazz. Their 1968 album Raaga-Jazz style is the earliest Indo-jazz recording in India. In this album, considered to be one of the most innovative, SJ created 11 songs based on Indian Ragas with saxophone, trumpet, sitar (by Rais Khan), tabla, bass etc.

== Awards ==
=== Government recognitions ===
- 1968 – Shankar-Jaikishan were honoured with the Padma Shri by the Government of India.
- 2013 – A postage stamp, bearing their faces, was released by India Post to honour them on 3 May 2013.

=== Filmfare Awards ===
FILMFARE AWARDS STARTED DURING 1954 FOR BEST MUSIC DIRECTOR:

Shankar-Jaikishan were the Winners for the films listed below:

Year	Film	Lyricist(s)
1957	Chori Chori	Shailendra, Hasrat Jaipuri
1960	Anari	Shailendra, Hasrat Jaipuri
1961	Dil Apna Aur Preet Parai	Shailendra, Hasrat Jaipuri
1963	Professor	Shailendra, Hasrat Jaipuri
1967	Suraj	Shailendra, Hasrat Jaipuri
1969	Brahmachari	Shailendra, Hasrat Jaipuri
1971	Pehchaan	Neeraj, Indeevar, Varma Malik
1972	Mera Naam Joker	Shailendra, Hasrat Jaipuri, Neeraj, Prem Dhawan, Shaily Shailendra.
1973	Be-Imaan	Varma Malik

==== Nominated ====
Year	Film	Lyricist(s)
1959	Yahudi	Hasrat Jaipuri, Shailendra
1960	Chhoti Bahen	Hasrat Jaipuri, Shailendra
1962	Jis Desh Mein Ganga Behti Hai	Hasrat Jaipuri, Shailendra
1964	Dil Ek Mandir	Hasrat Jaipuri, Shailendra
1965	Sangam	Hasrat Jaipuri, Shailendra
1966	Arzoo	Hasrat Jaipuri
1969	Diwana	Hasrat Jaipuri, Shailendra
1970	Chanda Aur Bijli	Neeraj, Indeevar
1972	Andaz	Hasrat Jaipuri
1975	Resham Ki Dori	Neeraj, Indeevar
1976	Sanyasi	Vitthalbhai Patel, Varma Malik, Vishweshawar Sharma, Hasrat Jaipuri, M G Hashmat

=== Bengal Film Journalists' Association Awards ===
Winner

- 1968 – Best Music Director for the film Brahmachari
- 1971 – Best Music Director for the film Andaz

== Achievements ==
- Barsaat has been rated the best soundtrack ever by Planet Bollywood on their "100 Greatest Bollywood Soundtracks". Other soundtracks in the list, include Awaara, Sangam, Shree 420, Junglee, Chori Chori, Mera Naam Joker, Suraj, Jis Desh Mein Ganga Behti Hai, Anari.

== Controversies ==
=== Alleged Dispute ===
In a signed article in Filmfare, Jaikishan identified unwittingly the song "Yeh Mera Prem Patra Padh Kar" (Sangam) as his composition. This led to a lot of bitterness between the two, as Shankar considered it a violation of the unwritten agreement between them. At about the same time, Shankar gave a break to singer Sharda and started promoting her as the new singing sensation in preference over Lata Mangeshkar. Jaikishan, however, stuck to Lata Mangeshkar for his compositions. In this period, Shankar and Jaikishan started taking individual contracts for films though every such film continued to show them together as the composers. Mohd. Rafi intervened and helped them settle their differences; however, it is conjectured that their relationship was not the same as earlier and this impacted the quality of their compositions which had started exhibiting a decline (which is clearly noticeable in the movies released during the last phases of Jaikishan's lifetime and those released just after his demise).

On the other hand, Jaikishan, Hasrat and Shankar all had denied, whenever quizzed on this topic, that there ever was any rift between them. In fact, according to Hasrat, the division of work was by mutual agreement to cope up with the heavy work load so that Shankar and Shailendra looked after one part of the work while Jaikishan and Hasrat on the other part but this division was not rigid; there was a lot of give and take between them even during this phase. Towards the end (just before Jaikishan's untimely demise), in several of their last movies, such as Jaane-Anjaane (1971), Andaz (1971) and Ankhon Ankhon Mein (1972), Shankar and Jaikishan were known to be working together. In retrospect, it appears that the so-called rift between Shankar and Jaikishan was blown out of proportion by the media and vested interests and was used later to downgrade Shankar in his post-Jaikishan years.

Since Shankar continued to support Sharda (post Sangam era) and even ghost-composed music for her film and non-film albums, it is said that Lata Mangeshkar became angry with him and discontinued singing for him. Whereas there may be some truth in this assertion, the other fact is that Lata Mangeshkar had stopped working with him after Sangam due to her anger against both Raj Kapoor and Shankar in making her sing "Budhha Mil Gaya" from Sangam which she was not keen as she did not feel comfortable with the lyrics of the song. Later on she sang in Sanyasi, Duniyadari and Atmaram. Nevertheless, she continued singing for Jaikishan even after Sangam and till the end.

== See also ==
- Dattaram Wadkar
