= Khwaja Ahmad Abbas =

Indian film director, screenwriter, novelist, and journalist

Khawaja Ahmad Abbas
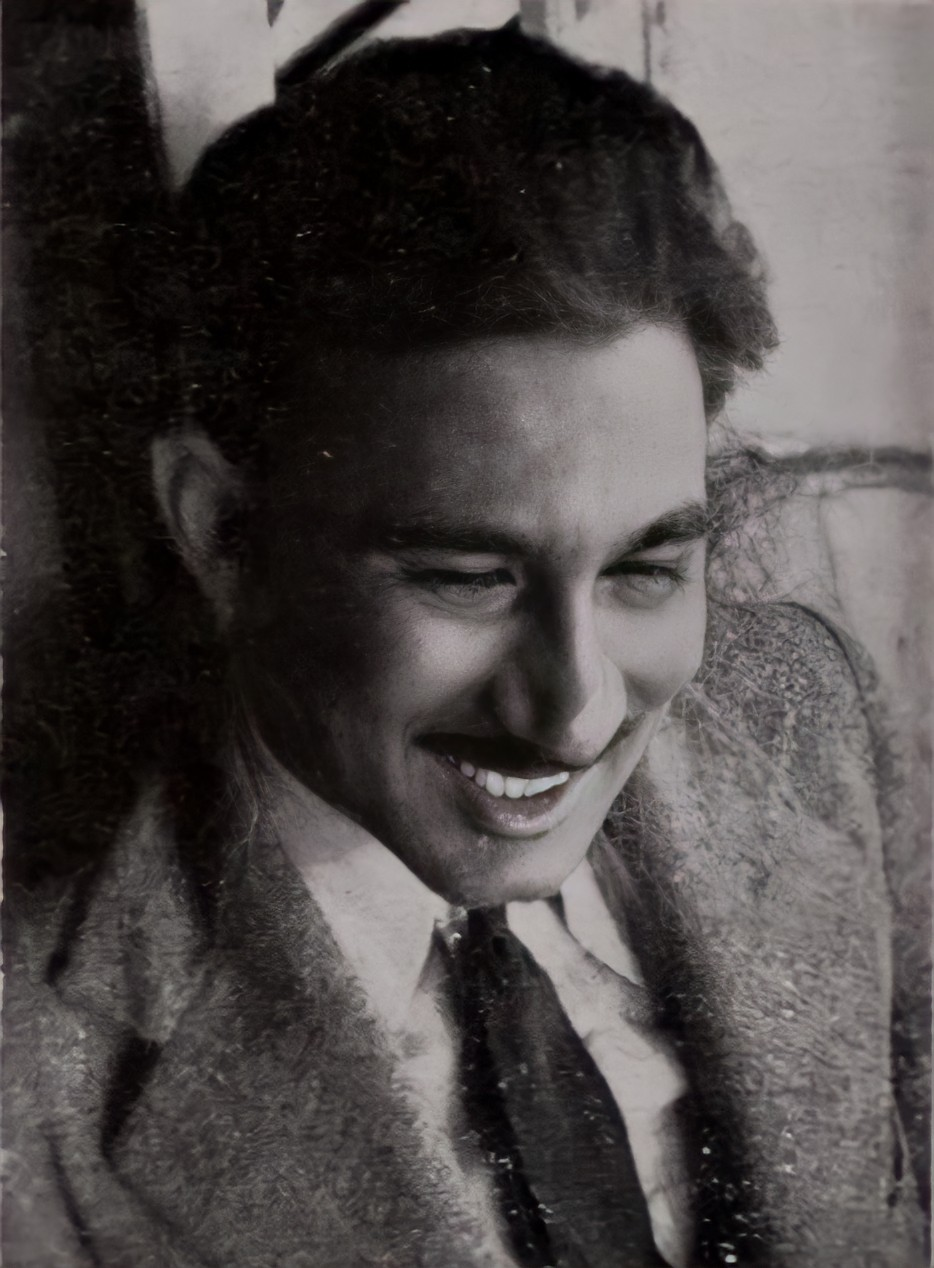
- Abbas in 1939
- Born: 7 June 1914; Panipat, Punjab, British India
- Died: 1 June 1987 (aged 72); Bombay, Maharashtra, India
- Other name: K A Abbas
- Occupations: Film director, screenwriter, novelist, journalist, columnist
- Years active: 1935–1987
- Notable work: Saat Hindustani; Mera Naam Joker
- Relatives: Altaf Hussain Hali (great-grandfather)
- Awards: National Film Awards; Golden Palm

Khwaja Ahmad Abbas (7 June 1914 – 1 June 1987) was an Indian film director, screenwriter, novelist, and journalist in Urdu, Hindi and English.

He won four National Film Awards in India. Internationally, his films won the Palme d'Or (Golden Palm Grand Prize) at Cannes Film Festival (out of three Palme d'Or nominations) and the Crystal Globe at Karlovy Vary International Film Festival. As a director and screenwriter, he is considered one of the pioneers of Indian parallel or neo-realistic cinema.

As a director, he made Hindustani films. Dharti Ke Lal (1946), about the Bengal famine of 1943, which was one of Indian cinema's first social-realist films, and opened up the overseas market for Indian films in the Soviet Union. Pardesi (1957) was nominated for the Palme d'Or. Shehar Aur Sapna (1963) won the National Film Award for Best Feature Film, while Saat Hindustani (1969) and Do Boond Pani (1972) both won the National Film Awards for Best Feature Film on National Integration.

As a screenwriter, he wrote a number of neo-realistic films, such as Dharti Ke Lal (which he also directed), Neecha Nagar (1946) which won the Palme d'Or at the first Cannes Film Festival, Naya Sansar (1941), Jagte Raho (1956), and Saat Hindustani (which he also directed). He is also known for writing Raj Kapoor's films, including the Palme d'Or-nominated Awaara (1951), as well as Shree 420 (1955), Mera Naam Joker (1970), Bobby (1973) and Henna (1991).

His column 'Last Page' was one of the longest-running newspaper columns in the history of Indian journalism. It began in 1935, in The Bombay Chronicle, and moved to the Blitz after the Chronicle's closure, where it continued until his death in 1987. He was awarded the Padma Shri by the Government of India in 1969.

In total, his works include 74 books, 90 short stories, 3000 journalistic articles and 40 films.

== Biography ==
=== Family background ===
Abbas belonged to the Ansari family of Panipat, tracing its roots back to Abu Ayyub al-Ansari, a close companion of the Islamic prophet Muhammad, and among the famed personalities that it produced we find: the 12th century Sufi saint Abdullah Ansari of Herat in Afghanistan; his maternal great-grandfather Altaf Hussain Hali, a student of Mirza Ghalib and himself an Urdu poet of repute; his paternal grandfather Khwaja Ghulam Abbas, one of the chief rebels of the 1857 Rebellion movement, and the first martyr of Panipat to be blown from the mouth of a cannon; his father Ghulam-us-Sibtain, among the first graduates from Aligarh Muslim University, who was a tutor of a prince and a businessman who modernised the preparation of Unani medicines; Abbas's mother, Masroora Khatoon, was the daughter of Khwaja Sajjad Husain, an educator keen on female education, having established the first school for girls in Panipat.

=== Early life and education ===
Abbas was born in Panipat, undivided Punjab. He attended Hali Muslim High School, which was established by his maternal grandfather, Hali. He was instructed to read the Arabic text of the Quran and matriculated at the age of fifteen.

He gained a Bachelor of Arts degree in English literature in 1933 and a Bachelor of Laws degree in 1935 from Aligarh Muslim University.

=== Illness and death ===
Abbas suffered from a heart attack in the 60s, followed by another more serious heart attack, a paralytic stroke as well a on set accident injuring his legs, but he kept working till his death at the age of 72 on 1 June 1987.

== Career ==
=== Journalism ===
After leaving university, K.A Abbas began his career as a journalist at the National Call, a New Delhi-based newspaper. Later while studying law in 1934, started Aligarh Opinion.

He joined The Bombay Chronicle in 1935 as a political correspondent and later, became a film critic for the newspaper.

He entered films as a part-time publicist for Bombay Talkies in 1936, a production house owned by Himanshu Rai and Devika Rani, to whom he sold his first screenplay Naya Sansar (1941).

While at The Bombay Chronicle (1935–1947), he started a weekly column called 'Last Page', which he continued when he joined the Blitz magazine. "The Last Page", ('Azad Kalam' in the Urdu edition) became the longest-running political column in India's history (1935–87). A collection of these columns was later published as two books. He continued to write for The Blitz and Mirror until his last days.

Abbas interviewed several renowned personalities in literary and non-literary fields, including the Russian Prime Minister Khrushchov, American President Roosevelt, Charlie Chaplin, Mao-Tse-Tung and Yuri Gagarin.

=== Cinema ===
Meanwhile, he had started writing scripts for other directors, Neecha Nagar for Chetan Anand and Dr. Kotnis Ki Amar Kahani for V. Shantaram.

In 1945, he made his directorial debut with a film based on the Bengal famine of 1943, Dharti Ke Lal (Children of the Earth), for the Indian People's Theatre Association (IPTA). In 1951, he founded his own production company called Naya Sansar, which consistently produced films that were socially relevant including, Anhonee, Munna, Rahi (1953), based on a Mulk Raj Anand story, was on the plight of workers on tea plantations, the National Film Award winner, Shehar Aur Sapna (1964) and Saat Hindustani (1969), which won the Nargis Dutt Award for Best Feature Film on National Integration and is also remembered as Bollywood icon Amitabh Bachchan's debut film. He wrote the story and screenplay for the controversial themed film in 1974 Call Girl directed by Vijay Kapoor, starring Vikram and Zaheera.

He went on to write scripts for Jagte Raho and prominent Raj Kapoor films including Awaara, Shri 420, Mera Naam Joker, Bobby and Henna.

=== Literature ===
Abbas wrote 74 books in English, Hindi and Urdu and was considered the leading light of the Urdu short story. His best known fictional work remains 'Inquilab', which made him a household name in Indian literature. Like Inquilab, many of his works were translated into many Indian and foreign languages, like Russian, German, Italian, French and Arabic.

His autobiography, I Am not an Island: An Experiment in Autobiography, was published in 1977 and again in 2010.

=== Censorship case ===
In 1968, Abbas made a documentary film called Char Shaher Ek Kahani (A Tale of Four Cities). The film depicted the contrast between the luxurious life of the rich in the four cities of Calcutta, Bombay, Madras and Delhi and that of the squalor and poverty of the poor. He approached the Central Board of Film Certification to obtain a 'U' (Unrestricted Public Exhibition) certificate. Abbas was, however, informed by the regional office of the Board that the film was not eligible to be granted a 'U' certificate, but was suitable for exhibition only for adults. His appeal to the revising committee of the Central Board of Film Certification led to the decision of the censors being upheld.

Khwaja Ahmad Abbas further appealed to the Central Government but the government decided to grant the film a 'U' certificate provided certain scenes were cut. Following this, Abbas approached the Supreme Court of India by filing a writ petition under Article 19(1) of the Indian Constitution. He claimed that his fundamental right of free speech and expression was denied by the Central Government's refusal to grant the film a 'U' certificate. Abbas also challenged the constitutional validity of pre-censorship on films. However the Supreme Court of India upheld the constitutional validity of pre-censorship on films. The government granted the movie a U certificate without any cuts. However, the Film Division, which was the sole distributor for short films in the country, did not buy the film. Hence, the movie was never publicly shown.

== Awards and honours ==
=== Films ===
- 1942: BFJA Awards: Best Screenplay: Naya Sansar (1941)
- 1946: Wrote screenplay for Neecha Nagar, which became the only Indian film to win the Palme d'Or (Golden Palm) at the Cannes Film Festival.
- 1951: Wrote screenplay for Awaara, which was nominated for the Palme d'Or at the Cannes Film Festival.
- 1956: Wrote screenplay for Jagte Raho, which won the Crystal Globe Grand Prix at the Karlovy Vary International Film Festival in 1957, and the Certificate of Merit at the fourth National Film Awards.
- 1958 Cannes Film Festival: Pardesi nominated for Palme d'Or (Golden Palm)
- 1960: All India Certificate of Merit for the Second Best Children's Film – Idd Mubarak
- 1964: National Film Award for Best Feature Film: Shehar Aur Sapna
- 1964: Maharashtra State Award: Fakira
- 1965: International Film Festival Awards at Santa Barbara, USA: Hamara Ghar
- 1966: Jury Member: 16th Berlin International Film Festival
- 1970: Nargis Dutt Award for Best Feature Film on National Integration at National Film Awards: Saat Hindustani
- 1972: Nargis Dutt Award for Best Feature Film on National Integration at National Film Awards: Do Boond Pani
- 1980: Gold Award for direction: The Naxalites

=== Literary ===
Haryana State Robe of Honour for literary achievements in 1969, the Ghalib Award for his contribution to Urdu prose literature in 1983

Vorosky Literary Award of the Soviet Union in 1984, Urdu Akademi Delhi Special Award 1984, Maharashtra State Urdu Akademi Award in 1985 and the Soviet Award for his contribution to the cause of Indo-Soviet Friendship in 1985.

== Filmography ==
- Naya Sansar (1941) – Screenplay, Story
- Dharti Ke Lal (1946) – Screenwriter, director, producer
- Dr. Kotnis Ki Amar Kahani (1946) – Screenwriter, Story
- Neecha Nagar (1946) – Screenwriter
- Aaj Aur Kal (1947) – Director
- Awara (1951) – Screenwriter, Dialogue
- Anhonee (1952) – Screenwriter, Dialogue, Story, director, producer
- Rahi 1953 – Director
- Munna (1954) – Screenwriter, director, producer
- Shree 420 (1955) – Screenwriter, Dialogue, Story
- Jagte Raho (1956) – Screenwriter
- Pardesi (1957)– Screenwriter, director
- Char Dil Char Rahen (1959) – Screenwriter, Dialogue, director
- Eid Mubarak (1960) Documentary / Short – Director
- Gir Game Sanctuary (1961) Documentary – Director
- Flight to Assam (1961) – Director
- Gyara Hazar Ladkian (1962) – Director
- Teen Gharaney (1963) – Director
- Shehar Aur Sapna (1964) – Director, screenwriter
- Hamara Ghar (1964) – Director
- Tomorrow Shall Be Better (1965) Documentary – Director
- Aasman Mahal (1965) – Director
- Bambai Raat Ki Bahon Mein (1967) – Writer, director, producer
- Dharti Ki Pukaar (1967) Short Film – Director
- Chaar Shaher Ek Kahani (1968) Documentary – Director
- Saat Hindustani (1969) – Director, producer
- Mera Naam Joker (1970) – Screenwriter, Story
- Do Boond Pani (1971) – Director
- Bharat Darshan (1972) Documentary - Director
- Luv Kush (1972) Short film - Director
- Bobby (1973) – Screenwriter, Story
- Kal Ki Baat (1973) Short Film – Director
- Call Girl (1973) - Story and Screenplay
- Achanak (1973) – Screenwriter
- Juhu (1973) (TV) – Director
- Faslah (1974) – Director, producer
- Papa Miya of Aligarh (1975) Documentary – Director
- Phir Bolo Aaye Sant Kabir (1976) Documentary – Director
- Dr. Iqbal (1978) – Documentary – Director
- The Naxalites (1980) – Screenwriter, director
- Hindustan Hamara (1983) Documentary / Short – Director
- Love in Goa (1983) – Screenwriter
- Nanga Fakir (1984) (TV) – Director
- Ek Aadmi (1988) – Director
- Akanksha (1989) (TV) – Dialogue, Screenplay
- Henna (1991) – Story

== Books ==
He wrote 74 books in English, Urdu and Hindi, including:

- Outside India: The Adventures of a Roving Reporter, Hali Pub. House, Delhi, 1939.
- An Indian looks at America (The Rampart library of good reading), 1943.
- An Indian looks at America, Thacker, Bombay, 1943.
- Tomorrow is ours! A novel of the India of Today; Bombay, Popular Book Depot, 1943.
- "Let India fight for freedom", Bombay, Sound magazine (Publication dept.), 1943.
- Defeat for death: A story without names, Padmaja Publications 1944.
- "...and One Did Not Come Back!", Sound magazine, 1944
- A report to Gandhiji: A survey of Indian and world events during the 21 months of Gandhiji's incarceration, 1944
- Invitation to Immortality: a one-act play, Bombay: Padma Pub., 1944.
- Not all Lies. Delhi: Rajkamal Pub., 1945.
- Blood and stones and other stories. Bombay: Hind Kitabs, 1947
- Rice and other stories, Kutub, 1947
- Kashmir fights for freedom, 1948
- I Write as I Feel, Hind Kitabs, Bombay, 1948
- Cages of freedom and other stories, Bombay, Hind Kitabs Ltd., 1952.
- China can make it: Eye-witness account of the amazing industrial progress in new China, 1952.
- In the Image of Mao Tse-Tung, Peoples Publishing House, 1953
- INQILAB. First Great Novel of the Indian Revolution, Jaico Publishing House, 1958
- Face To Face with Khrushchov, Rajpal & Sons, 1960
- Till We Reach the Stars. The Story of Yuri Gagarin, Asia Pub. House, 1961
- The Black sun and Other stories, Jaico Publishing House, 1963.
- Raat ki bahon mein, Hindi, Radhakr̥ishṇa Prakashan, 1965.
- Indira Gandhi; return of the red rose, Hind Pocket Books, New Delhi, 1966.
- Divided heart, Paradise Publications, 1968
- When Night Falls, 1968.
- Chabili, Hindi, Allahabad, Mitra Prakashan, 1968.
- The most beautiful woman in the world, Paradise Publications, 1968
- Salma aur Samundar, Urdu/Hindi, New Delhi, Komala Pocket Books, 1969.
- Mera Naam Joker, 1970
- Maria, Delhi, Hind Pocket Books, 1971.
- Teen Pahiye, Urdu/Hindi, Delhi, Rajpal & Sons, 1971.
- Bobby, Urdu/Hindi, 1973
- Boy meets Girl, Sterling Publishers, 1973
- That Woman: Her Seven Years in Power; New Delhi, Indian Book Co., 1973
- Jawaharlal Nehru: Portrait of an integrated Indian; New Delhi, NCERT, 1974.
- Fasilah, Urud/Hindi, Hind Pocket Books, Delhi, 1974
- Distant dream, New Delhi, Sterling Pub., 1975.
- The walls of glass: A novel, 1977
- Barrister-at-law: A play about the early life of Mahatma Gandhi, New Delhi, Orient Paperbacks, 1977.
- Men and women: Specially selected long and short stories, 1977
- Mad, mad, mad world of Indian films, 1977
- I Am not an Island: An Experiment in Autobiography, New Delhi, 1977.
- Four Friends, Arnold-Heinemann, New Delhi, 1977.
- 20 March 1977: a day like any other day, Vikas Publishing House, New Delhi, 1978.
- Janata in a jam?, 1978.
- The Naxalites, Lok Publications, 1979.
- Bread, beauty, and revolution: being a chronological selection from the Last pages, 1947 to 1981, Marwah Publications, New Delhi, 1982.
- Nili Sari aur Doosri Kahaniyan̲, Urdu, Maktabah-e-Jamia, New Delhi, 1982.
- The gun and other stories, Arnold-Heinemann, New Delhi, 1985.
- The Thirteenth Victim, Amar Prakashan, 1986.
- The World Is My Village: A Novel With An Index, Ajanta, 1984. ISBN 978-81-202-0104-0
- Bombay My Bombay: A Love Story of the City, Ajanta Publications/Ajanta Books International, 1987. ISBN 978-81-202-0174-3
- Indira Gandhi: The Last Post; Bombay, Ramdas G. Bhatkal, 1989
- Defeat for death: a story without names. Baroda: Padmaja Pub., 1994
- How Films Are Made, National Book Trust, 1999, ISBN 978-81-237-1103-4
- Soney Chandi ke Butt, Urdu, Alhamra, 2001, ISBN 978-969-516-074-9
- Khwaja Ahmad Abbas; Vasant Sāthe; Suhail Akhtar (2010). The Dialogue of Awaara: Raj Kapoor's Immortal Classic. Vijay Jani, Nasreen Munni Kabir. Niyogi Books. ISBN 978-81-89738-54-9.

For detailed listing :

== Bibliography ==
=== Books on Khwaja Ahmad Abbas ===
- Ahmad Hasib, The Novels of Khwaja Ahmad Abbas, Seema. 1987
- Hemendra Singh Chandalia, Ethos of Khwaja Ahmad Abbas, novelist, film-maker, and journalist: A study in social realism, Bohra Prakashan (1996)
- Raj Narain Raz, Khawaja Ahmed Abbas-Ifkar. Guftar, Kirdar, Haryana Urdu Akademi
- Vasudev and Lenglet, eds., Indian Cinema Super-bazaar, Vikas, New Delhi, 1978.

=== Articles on Khwaja Ahmad Abbas ===
- Dr. R.G. Mathapati, "Abbas: An Island"
- Indian Film Culture (New Delhi), no. 4, September 1964.
- Film World, vol. 1, no. 10, October 1978.
- Ghish, S., "K. A. Abbas: A Man in Tune with History", Screen (Bombay), 19 June 1987.
- Obituary in Jump Cut (Berkeley, California), no. 33, February 1988.
- Abbas, Communicator of repute, The Dawn, 13 October 2002.
- Shoba S. Rajgopal, The Legacy of Ajitha
- Ismat Chughtai, "Bachu", Urdu
- V. P. Sathe, "K.A. Abbas, The Crusader", Filmfare, 16–30 June 1987

V. K. Cherian (31 October 2016). India's Film Society Movement: The Journey and its Impact. SAGE Publications. p 61–. ISBN 978-93-85985-62-1.

== See also ==
- List of Indian writers
- Indian People's Theatre Association

== Cited sources ==
- Rajadhyaksha, Ashish (1999). Encyclopaedia of Indian cinema. Internet Archive. London: British Film Institute. ISBN 978-0-85170-669-6.
- Amaresh Datta (1987). Encyclopaedia of Indian Literature: A-Devo. Vol. 1. Sahitya Akademi. p. 4. ISBN 978-81-260-1803-1.
- S. Ghosh, "K. A. Abbas: A Man in Tune with History", Screen (Bombay), 19 June 1987, p. 14.
- Dictionary of Films (Berkeley: U. of CA Press, 1977), p. 84.
- Shyamala A. Narayan, The Journal of Commonwealth Literature, 1 1976; vol. 11: pp. 82 – 94.
- Ravi Nandan Sinha, Essays on Indian Literature in English. Jaipur, Book Enclave, 2002, ch. 7.
