= Raj Kapoor filmography =

Ranbir Raj Kapoor (born Shrishti Nath Kapoor; 14 December 1924 – 2 June 1988), popularly known as Raj Kapoor, was an Indian actor, film director and film producer who worked in Bollywood films. He was fondly called Raj Sahab, The Showman, The Greatest Show Man of Indian cinema, Charlie Chaplin of Indian cinema by his family, friends and fans. Kapoor worked in many films, and his filmography is listed below.

== Filmography ==
Year	Film	Character(s) played	Producer(s)	Director(s)	Notes	Ref.
1935	Inquilab			Debaki Kumar Bose	Debut film; child artist	
1943	Gauri		Chandulal Jesangbhai Shah	Kidar Nath Sharma		
1943	Hamari Baat			Kidar Nath Sharma	Child artist	
1946	Mahahrishi Valmiki	Naradamuni	All workers under Prabhakar Pictures	Bhalji Pendharkar	First adult role; credited as Kumar Raj	
1947	Neel Kamal	Madhusudan	Kidar Nath Sharma		First leading role	
1947	Chittor Vijay		Mohan Sinha			
1947	Dil-Ki-Rani alias Sweet-Heart	Madhav "Madho"	P. V. Banker	Mohan Sinha		
1947	Jail Yatra		Gajanan Jagirdar			
1948	Aag	Kewal Khanna	Yes	Yes		
1948	Amar Prem alias Radha Krishna	Krishna	V. N. Misra	N. M. Kelkar		
1948	Gopinath	Mohan	Mahesh Kaul			
1949	Andaz	Rajan	Mehboob Khan			
1949	Barsaat	Pran	Yes	Yes		
1949	Sunehre Din	Premendra		Satish Nigam		
1949	Parivartan		N. R. Acharya			
1950	Banwra		Raghpat Roy Kapur alias G. Rakesh			
1950	Bawre Nain	Chand	Kidar Nath Sharma			
1950	Dastan	Raj	Abdur Rashid Kardar			
1950	Jan Pahchan	Anil	Fali D. Mistry and Robin Chatterjee	Fali D. Mistry		
1950	Pyar	Banke		Vishnu Kumar Magan Lal Vyas		
1950	Sargam	Vinod		Pyare Lal Santoshi		
1951	Awara	Raj	Yes	Yes		
1952	Amber	Raj	Jagat Narain	Jayantilal Jhinabhai Desai		
1952	Anhonee	Raj Kumar Saxena	Khwaja Ahmad Abbas			
1952	Ashiana	Raju	B. Swinder Sabharwal	B. Trilochan		
1952	Bewafa	Raj	Jaffer Hussain	M. L. Anand	Only film where he played a fully gray or negative character.	
1953	Aah	Raj	Yes	Raja Nawathe		
1953	Dhoon	Raj	Pramila	Mijjan Kumar		
1953	Lahren	Shree 420	Ramchandra Narhar Chitalkar	Harnam Singh Rawail	Guest appearance; the nickname of his character Shree 420 in this film probably inspired the title of his 1955 classic film.	
1953	Papi	Raju and Swami Satyanand	Chandulal Jesangbhai Shah		Only film where he played a dual or double role.	
1954	Boot Polish	A sleeping man on the train beside a window (played either himself or his lookalike)	Yes	Prakash Arora	Uncredited cameo	
1955	Shree 420	Ranbir Raj	Yes	Yes		
1956	Chori Chori	Sagar	L. B. Lachman	Anant Thakur		
1956	Jagte Raho	A peasant	Yes	Sombhu Mitra and Amit Maitra		
1956	Ek Din Ratre	A peasant	Yes	Sombhu Mitra and Amit Maitra	Bengali version of Jagte Raho (1956)	
1957	Ab Dilli Dur Nahin	No	Yes	Amar Kumar		
1957	Sharada	Shekhar alias Chiranjeev	Akkineni Lakshmi Vara Prasada Rao			
1958	Parvarish	Raja Singh	Mahipatray Shah	S. Banerjee		
1958	Phir Subha Hogi	Ram Mehra	Ramesh Saigal			
1959	Anari	Raj Kumar	L. B. Lachman	Hrishikesh Mukherjee		
1959	Char Dil Char Rahen	Govinda	Khwaja Ahmad Abbas			
1959	Do Ustad	Rajan Kumar	Sheikh Mukhtar	Tarachand Harish Mathur	His character is often mistaken to be his real self in the film.	
1959	Kanhaiya	Kanhaiya	Sant Singh and Pachhi Chibber	Om Prakash Chibber		
1959	Main Nashe Men Hoon	Ram Das Khanna		Naresh Saigal		
1960	Chhalia	Chhalia	Subhash Desai	Manmohan Desai		
1960	Jis Desh Men Ganga Behti Hai	Raju	Yes	Radhu Karmakar		
1960	Shriman Satyawadi	Vijay Kumar	Mahipatray Shah	Syed Mohammed Abbas		
1961	Nazrana	Rajesh	S. Krishnamurthy and T. Govindarajan	Chithamur Vijayaraghavalu Sridhar		
1962	Aashiq	Gopal alias Uday Kumar	Bunny Reuben and Vijay Kishore Dubey	Hrishikesh Mukherjee		
1963	Dil Hi To Hai	Yusuf alias Chand	B. L. Rawal	Pyare Lal Santoshi and C. L. Rawal		
1963	Ek Dil Sau Afsane	Shekhar	Raghbir Chand Talwar			
1964	Dulha Dulhan	Raj Kumar	Ravindra Dave			
1964	Sangam	Sundar Khanna	Yes	Yes	Also Editor	
1966	Teesri Kasam	Hiraman	Shailendra	Basu Bhattacharya		
1967	Around the World	Raj Singh	Pachhi Chibber			
1967	Diwana	Pyare Lal	Mukhram Sharma and N. C. Sippy	Mahesh Kaul		
1968	Sapno Ka Saudagar	Raj Kumar	B. Ananthaswami	Mahesh Kaul		
1970	Mera Naam Joker	Raju	Yes	Yes		
1971	Kal Aaj Aur Kal	Ram Kapoor	Yes	Randhir Kapoor		
1973	Bobby	No	Yes	Yes		
1973	Mera Desh Mera Dharam	Dr. Banerjee	Dara Singh			
1975	Dharam Karam	Ashok Kumar	Yes	Randhir Kapoor		
1975	Do Jasoos	Dharam Chand	Naresh Kumar Tuli			
1976	Khaan Dost	Ramdin Pandey	Pawan Kumar and Yogi	Dulal Guha		
1977	Chandi Sona	Gypsy singer	Sanjay Khan		Guest appearance as the performer of the song "Apna Kya Hai Hum Toh Anjaane"	
1978	Satyam Shivam Sundaram	No	Yes	Yes		
1978	Naukri	Swaraj Singh (Captain)	Jayendra Pandya, Rajaram Pandya and Satish Wagle	Hrishikesh Mukherjee		
1980	Ramu To Diwana Hai		Chandru		Guest appearance	
1980	Abdullah	Abdullah	Sanjay Khan			
1981	Naseeb	(Himself)	Manmohan Desai		Guest appearance as one of the film stars in the song "John Jani Janardhan"	
1981	Biwi O Biwi	No	Yes	Rahul Rawail		
1982	Gopichand Jasoos	Gopichand	Naresh Kumar Tuli			
1982	Vakil Babu	Satyaprakash Mathur	Jawahar Kapur	Asit Sen		
1982	Prem Rog	No	Yes	Yes		
1983	Film Hi Film	Suresh and a clown	Shahab Ahmed	Hiren Nag	Documentary film where footages of his shelved film Reporter produced by C. M. Trivedi and directed by Manibhai Vyas starring him, Gope and Ramayan Tiwari in which he played the title role of a reporter named Suresh (supoosed to have been released circa 1960, nearly 3 years after Gope's demise) and footage of the song "Has Kar Hasa, Masti Mein Gaa" sung by Manna Dey from the shelved film Bahrupiya produced by Navin Chandra Shah and directed by Nandlal Jaswantlal Mehta in which he played the title role of a clown were used (supposed to have been released circa 1964, nearly 3 years after Jaswantlal's demise).	
1985	Ram Teri Ganga Maili	No	Yes	Yes		
1990	Dhadaka	Dancer-singer	Dr. Malik Pawar		Marathi film; Guest appearance as one of the performers in the song "Nache O Nache Abdullah Mama"; Posthomous release	

== See also ==
- List of awards and nominations received by Raj Kapoor
