= Raja Nawathe =

Indian film producer and director (1924-2005)

Raja Nawathe राजा नवाथे
- Born: Raja Nawathe; 14 October 1924; Ratnagiri, Bombay Presidency, British Raj (now Maharashtra, India)
- Died: 15 November 2005 (aged 81); Mumbai, Maharashtra, India
- Occupations: Film director, Producer, Assistant Film Director
- Years active: 1948–1973
- Spouse: Chitra Nawathe(Award winning Marathi Actress)
- Children: Son (deceased a few years prior to father's demise)

Raja Nawathe; 14 October 1924 – 15 November 2005) was an Indian film producer, director, assistant film director, in Bombay's Hindi film industry, long before it came to be known as Bollywood. He is known for films like Raj Kapoor-Nargis starrer Aah (1953) and thriller Gumnaam (1965).

== Career ==
Raja Nawathe had commenced his film career as assistant director to Raj Kapoor, for three productions from R.K. Films, viz. Aag (1948), Barsaat (1949), and Awaara (1951). His debut as independent director commenced with the film, Aah, in 1953, produced by Raj Kapoor, which, at the time, did not quite make its mark at the box-office. However, the songs and music of the film are considered classics of Indian cinema. Subsequently, the film was dubbed in Tamil and Telugu. Raja Nawathe's next directorial venture in 1956, Basant Bahar, was a musical success. This film received the "Certificate of Merit for Best Feature Film in Hindi", a National Film Award for Best Feature Film in Hindi. For lead roles of his next film, Sohni Mahiwal (1958), Nawathe again paired Bharat Bhushan with Nimmi, both legendary stars of that era. Other noteworthy films by Raja Nawathe are: Gumnaam (1965), a suspense thriller based on an Agatha Christie novel, starring Manoj Kumar and Nanda in the lead roles; with mesmerizing music direction by maestros Shankar–Jaikishan. In 1967, for Patthar ke Sanam, he cast Manoj Kumar once again, now with Waheeda Rehman, as the lead pair; Laxmikant–Pyarelal created some memorable music for this film. Bhai-Bhai in (1970), was directed with Sunil Dutt and Asha Parekh in the lead roles; it had melodious music by Shankar–Jaikishan. Manchali (1973) was a comedy, and departed from Raja Nawathe's earlier films; it is also memorable for the super comical role played by Sanjeev Kumar. Leena Chandavarkar, by then an actress well established in her own right, was lead actress for this film. The music for this romantic comedy was composed by celebrity duo Laxmikant Pyarelal, stalwarts at the time, with a decade of music success behind them.

== Death ==
After suffering from a long illness, Raja Nawathe died in Mumbai, on Wednesday morning, 15 November 2005, a month after his 81st birthday.

== Filmography ==
- Aah (1953)
- Basant Bahar (1956)
- Sohni Mahiwal (1958)
- Gumnaam (1965)
- Patthar ke Sanam (1967)
- Bhai-Bhai (1970)
- Manchali(1973)
