= Jail Yatra =

Jail Yatra (lit. 'Jail Visit' or 'prison visitation') may refer to:

- Jail Yatra (1981 film), an Indian Bollywood film
- Jail Yatra (1947 film), an Indian Hindi-language drama film
