= Behzad Lucknavi =

Pakistani poet, lyricist (1900–1974)

- Born: Sardar Hasan Khan; January 1, 1900; Lucknow, India
- Died: 10 October 1974 (aged 74); Karachi, Pakistan
- Occupations: Poet, Lyricist
- Writing career
- Pen name: Behzad Lucknavi
- Language: Urdu
- Genres: Gazal; Naʽat; Nazm

Behzad Lucknavi (born Sardar Hasan Khan; 1 January 1900 – 10 October 1974) was a Pakistani Urdu poet and lyricist. He primarily wrote naats and ghazals and sometimes radio plays for the All India Radio, Delhi and later for Radio Pakistan after emigrating to Pakistan.

He started participating in mushairas at age of twelve. Then veteran radio personality Zulfiqar Ali Bukhari introduced him to All India Radio.

He wrote film song lyrics for seventeen films, including Roti (1942), Taj Mahal (1941) and Dhanwan (1937).

== Biography ==
He was born as Sardar Hasan Khan on 1 January 1900 in United Province, British India (in modern-day Lucknow, India). He initially worked in the Indian Railways but later for the All India Radio at ₹120 per month. He was later employed by the Radio Pakistan where he used to recite naats as part of congregational prayer. He also wrote a number of radio plays.

As a ghazal writer, he contributed to the Urdu literature of Pakistan. An Indian ghazal singer, Begum Akhtar first gained her recognition after she sang her first ghazal Diwana banana hai toh, toh diwana bana de written by Lakhnavi. He also wrote film song lyrics, including "Mere Liye Woh Gham-e-Intezaar" for the film Anokha Pyar (1948) sung by Lata Mangeshkar.

Lucknavi's ghazal, Aey Jazba-e-Dil Gar Mein Chahun, Har Cheez Muqabil Aajaye is very popular in Pakistan and has been sung by many singers there.

== Publications ==
| # | Title | Year | Type/Credited as | Ref. |
|---|---|---|---|---|
| 1 | Haseen Qatil | 1924 | novel | |
| 2 | Paidaishi Jasoos | 1925 | Novel | |
| 3 | Bete Ka Qatil | 1926 | Novel | |
| 4 | Mushaf-e-Bahzad | 1938 | —N/a | |
| 5 | Behzad Lucknavi Ke Sau Geet | 1940 | Poetry | |
| 6 | Charagh-e-Toor | 1941 | Poetry | |
| 7 | Kufr-o-Iman | 1945 | Poetry | |
| 8 | Sana-e-Habeeb | 1954 | Poetry | |
| 9 | Wajd-o-Haal | 1955 | Poetry | |
| 10 | Aah Na Tamam | —N/a | Poetry | |
| 11 | Aah Na Tamam | —N/a | Poetry | |
| 12 | Aah-e-Natamam | —N/a | Poetry | |
| 13 | Bahram Ki Wapsi | —N/a | Novel | |
| 14 | Bustan-e-Bahzad | —N/a | Poetry | |
| 15 | Kaif-o-Suroor | —N/a | Poetry | |
| 16 | Mauj-e-Noor | —N/a | Poetry | |
| 17 | Mauj-e-Tuhoor | —N/a | Poetry | |
| 18 | Naat-e-Huzoor | —N/a | Poetry | |
| 19 | Naghma-e-Noor | —N/a | Poetry | |
| 20 | Naghmat-e-Bahzad Lakhnavi | —N/a | Poetry | |
| 21 | Pili Chhatri | —N/a | Poetry | |

== Filmography ==
Key
| † | Remarks denote a short description of the work where available. |

| # | Year | Title | Lyricist | Dialogue | Screenwriter | Ref. |
|---|---|---|---|---|---|---|
| 1 | 1951 | Pyar Ki Baten | Yes | | | |
| 2 | 1951 | Ada | Yes | | | |
| 3 | 1950 | Khel | Yes | | | |
| 4 | 1950 | Pagle | Yes | | | |
| 5 | 1950 | Wafa | Yes | | | |
| 6 | 1949 | Ladli | Yes | | | |
| 7 | 1949 | Nisbat | Yes | | | |
| 8 | 1948 | Aag | Yes | | | |
| 9 | 1948 | Anokha Pyar | Yes | | | |
| 10 | 1947 | Andhon Ki Duniya | Yes | | | |
| 11 | 1947 | Jadui Ratan | Yes | | | |
| 12 | 1946 | Dhanwan | Yes | | | |
| 13 | 1943 | Poonji | Yes | | | |
| 14 | 1942 | Zamindar | Yes | Yes | Yes | |
| 15 | 1942 | Roti | Yes | | | |
| 16 | 1941 | Taj Mahal | Yes | | | |
| 17 | 1931 | Dhanwan | Yes | | | |

== Personal life ==
He spent his last days in difficult circumstances due to personal financial crisis and medical complications. He then submitted a request to the Karachi Municipal Corporation for financial assistance. He was given PKR1,000 for his surgery. The commissioner of Karachi later offered him a government job at primary school as a teacher but he refused the post.

== Death ==
He died on 10 October 1974 in Karachi, Pakistan.
