= List of awards and nominations received by Raj Kapoor =

List of awards and nominations received by Raj Kapoor awards and nominations
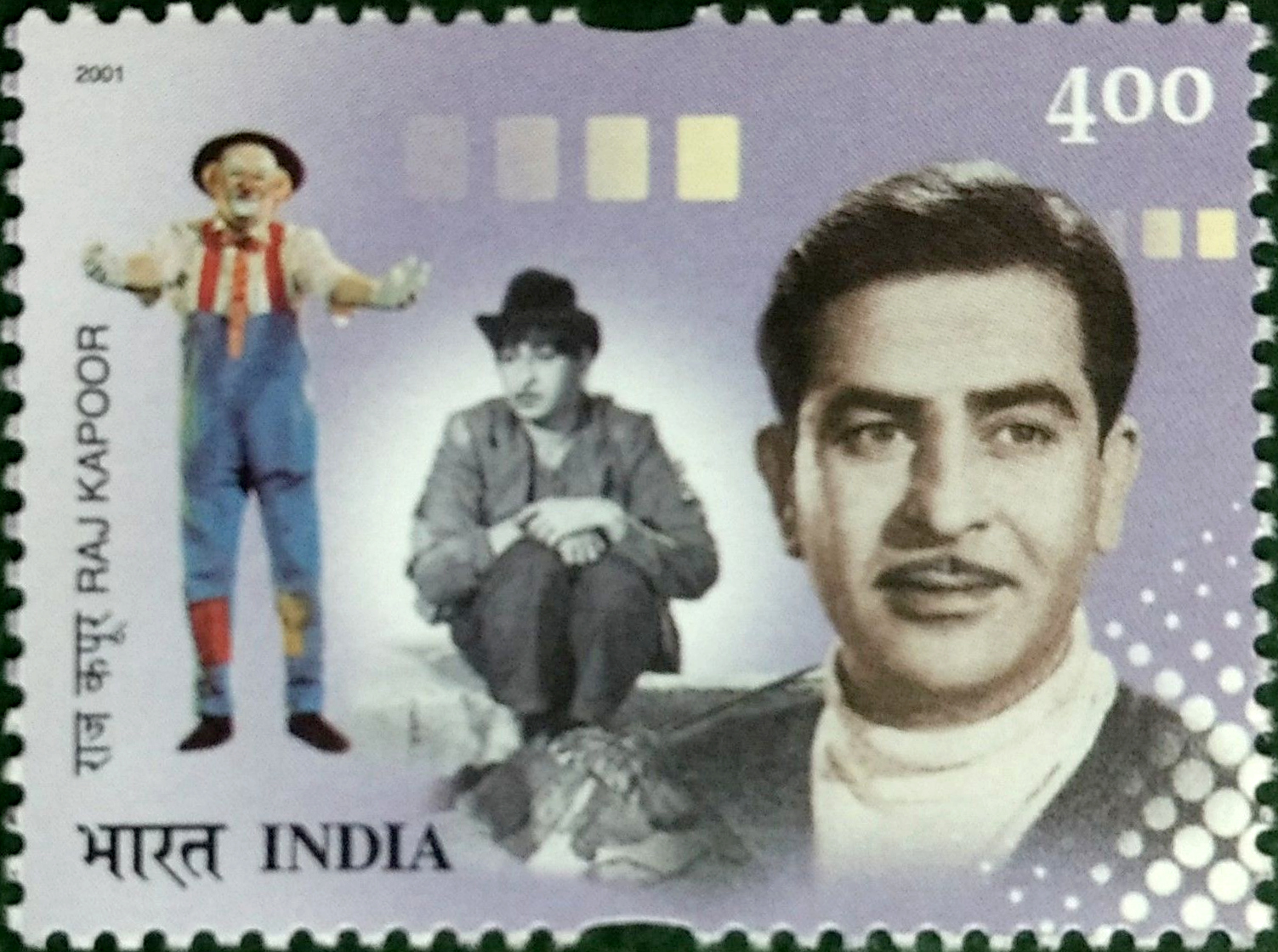
- Kapoor on a 2001 stamp of India
Awards and nominations
Award	Wins	Nominations
National Film Awards	3	3
Filmfare Awards	11	23
Bengal Film Journalists' Association Awards	5	5
Other awards	8	10

Totals (Note: Certain award groups do not simply award one winner. They acknowledge several different recipients, have runners-up, and have third place. Since this is a specific recognition and is different from losing an award, runner-up mentions are considered wins in this award tally. For simplification and to avoid errors, each award in this list has been presumed to have had a prior nomination.)
- Wins: 27
- Nominations: 41

Raj Kapoor (born Shrishti Nath Kapoor; 14 December 1924 – 2 June 1988), also known as The Greatest Show Man of Indian Cinema, was an Indian actor, film director and film producer who worked in Hindi cinema.

Kapoor is regarded as one of the greatest and most influential filmmakers and actors in the history of Indian cinema. He was the winner of several accolades including 3 National Film Awards and 11 Filmfare Awards in India. The Filmfare Lifetime Achievement Award is named after Raj Kapoor. He was a two-time nominee for the Palme d'Or grand prize at the Cannes Film Festival for his films Awaara (1951) and Boot Polish (1954). His performance in Awaara was ranked as one of the top ten greatest performances of all time by Time magazine. His films attracted worldwide audiences, particularly in Asia and Europe. He was called the Clark Gable of the Indian film industry.

The Government of India honoured him with the Padma Bhushan in 1971 for his contributions to the arts. India's highest award in cinema the Dadasaheb Phalke Award was bestowed him in 1987 by the Government of India.

== International honours and recognitions ==
- Kapoor was nominated for the Grand Prize at the 1953 Cannes Film Festival for Awaara
- Kapoor was also nominated for the Grand Prize for Boot Polish
- In 1955, he was conferred with an honorary degree in Tehran.
- His film Jagte Raho (1956) also won the Crystal Globe award at the Karlovy Vary International Film Festival.
- A Raj Kapoor Film Festival was held on his 75th Birth Anniversary at the Cultural Centre of Russia on 17 January 2000.
- The 55th Cannes International Film Festival, which was held from 16 to 26 May 2002, comprised a Raj Kapoor Retrospective as a tribute to the showman.
- The prestigious Centre Georges Pompidou in Paris was hosting an important 3-month long festival of popular Indian cinema from February to April 2004, dedicated to five great Indian film personalities: Raj Kapoor, Guru Dutt, Mehboob Khan, Bimal Roy and V. Shantaram.
- A Raj Kapoor film festival was held in The Netherlands city The Hague from 22 May – 1 June 2008.
- A Raj Kapoor film festival will be held in the Omani capital Muscat from 27 May – 10 June 2008.
- In 2011, the city of Brampton, Ontario, announced that a new street would be named Raj Kapoor Crescent in Kapoor's honour.

== National honours and recognitions ==
- Kapoor had been conferred with a "National Award" for cinematography for contribution to Indian cinema.
- In 1971, he was honoured with the Padma Bhushan, India's third highest civilian award from the Government of India.
- The Filmfare Lifetime Achievement Award is named after Raj Kapoor.
- The Government of Maharashtra has named a Life Time Contribution award and a Special Contribution Award in honor of Raj Kapoor.
- On 8 January 2001, he was honoured with the "Best Director of the Millennium" award by Hero Honda-Stardust
- In 2002, he was named "Showman of the Millennium" at the Screen Awards
- In 2007, he was conferred with a "Special Award" at the Screen Awards

== National Film Awards ==
Year	Category	For	Result	Ref.
1955	Best Feature Film in Hindi	Shree 420	Won	
1960	Best Feature Film in Hindi	Jis Desh Men Ganga Behti Hai	Won	
1987	Dadasaheb Phalke Award	–	Won	

== Filmfare Awards ==
Raj Kapoor had been nominated for 23 Filmfare Awards in all, winning 11.

Year	Category	For	Result	Ref.
1954	Best Film	Boot Polish	Won	
1956	Best Actor	Jagte Raho	Nominated	
1958	Best Actor	Phir Subha Hogi	Nominated	
1959	Best Actor	Anari	Won	
1960	Best Actor	Jis Desh Mein Ganga Behti Hai	Won	
1960	Best Actor	Chhalia	Nominated	
1964	Best Actor	Sangam	Nominated	
1964	Best Film	Sangam	Nominated	
1964	Best Editing	Sangam	Won	
1964	Best Director	Sangam	Won	
1970	Best Director	Mera Naam Joker	Won	
1970	Best Film	Mera Naam Joker	Nominated	
1973	Best Film	Bobby	Nominated	
1973	Best Director	Bobby	Nominated	
1978	Best Director	Satyam Shivam Sundaram	Nominated	
1980	Best Supporting Actor	Abdullah	Nominated	
1982	Best Director	Prem Rog	Won	
1982	Best Editing	Prem Rog	Won	
1982	Best Film	Prem Rog	Nominated	
1985	Best Film	Ram Teri Ganga Maili	Won	
1985	Best Director	Ram Teri Ganga Maili	Won	
1985	Best Editing	Ram Teri Ganga Maili	Won	
1985	Best Story	Ram Teri Ganga Maili	Nominated	

== Bengal Film Journalists' Association Awards ==
Year	Result	Category	For	Ref.
1964	Best Director	Sangam	Won	
1964	Best Editor	Sangam	Won	
1967	Best Actor (Hindi)	Teesri Kasam	Won	
1971	Best Actor (Hindi)	Mera Naam Joker	Won	
1971	Best Director	Mera Naam Joker	Won	

== Bibliography ==
- Nanda, Ritu (2002). Raj Kapoor: Speaks. Penguin Books India. ISBN 978-0-670-04952-3.
