= Parivartana =

Parivartana may refer to:

- Parivartana (1954 film), an Indian Telugu film
- Parivartana (1975 film), an Indian Telugu film

== See also ==
- Parivartan, activism organisation based in New Delhi, India
- Parivartan (film), a 1949 Indian Hindi film
