= Aah (film) =

1953 Indian film by Raja Nawathe

- Theatrical poster
- Directed by: Raja Nawathe
- Written by: Inder Raj Anand
- Screenplay by: Inder Raj Anand
- Story by: Inder Raj Anand
- Produced by: Raj Kapoor
- Starring: Raj Kapoor; Nargis; Pran
- Cinematography: Jaywant Pathare
- Edited by: G. G. Mayekar
- Music by: Shankar Jaikishan
- Production company: R. K. Films
- Distributed by: R. K. Films
- Release date: 22 March 1953
- Running time: 150 minutes
- Country: India
- Language: Hindi
- Box office: est. ₹ 70 lakh (est. ₹ 71.68 crore as of 2019)

Aah is a 1953 Indian Hindi-language romantic drama film directed by Raja Nawathe and produced by Raj Kapoor and starring Kapoor and Nargis in the lead roles. This was Nawathe's first independent directorial venture. He had previously worked as assistant director to Raj Kapoor in Aag (1948), Barsaat (1949) and Awaara (1951).

The film was rated "Below Average" at the box office, but included hit songs such as "Raja Ki Aayegi Baaraat", "Aaja Re Ab Mera Dil Pukara" and "Jaane Na Nazar". The song "Chhoti Si Yeh Zindagani" sung by Mukesh was also picturised on him. Subsequently, the film was later dubbed in Tamil as Avan (dialogues by S. D. Sundharam) and Telugu as Prema Lekhalu. Ah Bu Dünya, a Turkish remake by Nuri Ergün, was released in 1965, Boş Çerçeve directed by Ertem Eğilmez in 1969

== Plot ==
Raj Raibahadur (Raj Kapoor) lives a wealthy life with his widowed businessman father. He is sent to work in the countryside at Saraswati Dam, where his father later visits him and reminds him of his deceased mother's wish for him to marry Chandra (Vijayalaxmi), the daughter of a wealthy family friend. Raj writes to Chandra, but she ignores his letter. Her younger sister, Neelu (Nargis), replies in Chandra's name, and their correspondence gradually leads Raj and Neelu to fall in love, although Raj remains unaware of Neelu's identity.

Raj is subsequently diagnosed with tuberculosis, the same disease that killed his mother. Believing his illness will prevent them from having a future together, he pretends that he never loved Neelu and urges her to marry his physician friend, Dr. Kailash (Pran). He also flirts with Chandra to convince Neelu that his feelings for her are not genuine.

Seeing her sister's heartbreak, Chandra decides to put an end to her suffering. Once Neelu learns the truth, she accepts Raj despite his illness. Raj then miraculously recovers, allowing the couple to unite and live happily together.

== Theme and plot change ==
The theme of the tragic hero and the sufferings of the heroine was inspired from Sarat Chandra Chattopadhyay's famous novel Devdas, which has also served as an inspiration to various other Indian films.

The end of the film originally showed Neelu marrying Dr. Kailash at Raj's insistence; Raj dies while Neelu's wedding procession is passing by. But at the premiere, Kapoor realised that this film would not work. Kapoor said

The atmosphere in an auditorium is like a living, palpitating thing. It told me again and again: "Your picture is a flop."

The end of the film was then changed from a tragic one to the happy one, but the change destroyed the thematic unity of the text. Bunny Reuben, who wrote Kapoor's biography Raj Kapoor, The Fabulous Showman, gives his rationale for the change: "The film had some of Shankar-Jaikishan's loveliest music, and a 'Devdas'-ian tragic ending which was changed to the conventional happy ending because the film didn't do well in its first release."

The Telugu dubbed version of the film Prema Lekhalu, was so well received that Raj Kapoor was elated and showed his gratitude for Telugu audiences by having a song in Shree 420 (1955) beginning with the lines "Ramaiya Vastavaiya" (Lord Ram, you will come).

== Cast ==
- Nargis as Neelu Rai
- Raj Kapoor as Raj Raibahadur
- Vijayalaxmi as Chandra Rai
- Pran as Dr. Kailash
- Ramesh Sinha
- Bhupendra Kapoor
- Leela Mishra as Mrs. Rai
- Rashid Khan as Dr. Yusuf
- Sohanlal
- Kusum
- Mukesh as Carriage Driver (Cameo role)

== Music ==
Composed by the musical duo Shankar Jaikishan.

Hindi songs for the film are written by Shailendra and Hasrat Jaipuri.

| No. | Title | Lyrics | Singer(s) | Length |
|---|---|---|---|---|
| 1. | "Jaane Na Nazar" | Hasrat Jaipuri | Lata Mangeshkar, Mukesh | 3:38 |
| 2. | "Jhanan Jhanan Jhanan" | Hasrat Jaipuri | Lata Mangeshkar | 2:52 |
| 3. | "Jo Main Jaanti" | Shailendra | Lata Mangeshkar, Mukesh | 3:25 |
| 4. | "Raat Andheri Door Savera" | Hasrat Jaipuri | Mukesh | 3:02 |
| 5. | "Aaja Re Ab Mera Dil Pukara" | Hasrat Jaipuri | Lata Mangeshkar, Mukesh | 3:44 |
| 6. | "Yeh Shaam Ki Tanhaiyan" | Shailendra | Lata Mangeshkar | 3:23 |
| 7. | "Sunte The Naam" | Shailendra | Lata Mangeshkar | 3:06 |
| 8. | "Raja Ki Aayegi Baaraat" | Shailendra | Lata Mangeshkar | 3:29 |
| 9. | "Chhoti Si Yeh Zindagani" | Shailendra | Mukesh | 3:34 |

Tamil lyrics for the film are written by Kambadasan.

| No. | Title | Lyrics | Singer(s) | Length |
|---|---|---|---|---|
| 1. | "Kann Kaanaadhadhum Manam Kannduvidum" | Kambadasan | Jikki, A. M. Rajah | 3:38 |
| 2. | "Jalakku Jalakku Jalakku Jalakku" | Kambadasan | Jikki | 2:52 |
| 3. | "Aahaa Naan Indru Arindhukonden" | Kambadasan | Jikki | 3:25 |
| 4. | "Kaarirul Neram Kaalaiyo Dhooram" | Kambadasan | A. M. Rajah | 3:02 |
| 5. | "Anbe Vaa" | Kambadasan | Jikki, A. M. Rajah | 3:44 |
| 6. | "Ekaanthamaam Immaalaiyil" | Kambadasan | Jikki | 3:23 |
| 7. | "Un Perai Ketten Thendralthanil Naan" | Kambadasan | Jikki | 3:06 |
| 8. | "Kalyaana Oorvalam Varum" | Kambadasan | Jikki | 3:29 |
| 9. | "Minnal Polaagum Indha Vaazhkkaiye" | Kambadasan | A. M. Rajah | 3:34 |

Telugu songs for the film are written by Aarudhra. Amongst them Panditlo Pellauthunnadi song is an evergreen track played at many marriage functions even today.

| No. | Title | Lyrics | Singer(s) | Length |
|---|---|---|---|---|
| 1. | "Neevewaravo Chiru Naawulato" | Aarudhra | Jikki, A. M. Rajah | 3:38 |
| 2. | "Jalakku Jalakku Jalakku Jalakku" | Aarudra | Jikki | 2:52 |
| 3. | "Ghallu... Gajjela Sangeetam" | Aarudra | Jikki | 3:25 |
| 4. | "Vidi Rakasi" | Aarudra | A. M. Rajah | 3:02 |
| 5. | "Raaraada Madhi Ninne" | Aarudra | Jikki, A. M. Rajah | 3:44 |
| 6. | "Ekaanthamu Saayantramu" | Aarudra | Jikki | 3:23 |
| 7. | "Neeku Purtigaa Telusunugaa" | Aarudra | Jikki | 3:06 |
| 8. | "Panditlo Pellauthunadhi" | Aarudra | Jikki | 3:29 |
| 9. | "Padu Jeevithamu" | Aarudra | A. M. Rajah | 3:34 |
