= Armaan (1953 film) =

1953 film

- Lobby card
- Directed by: Fali Mistry
- Produced by: Fali Mistry
- Starring: Dev Anand; Madhubala
- Music by: S. D. Burman
- Production company: Film Technician of India
- Release date: 19 August 1953
- Country: India
- Language: Hindi

Armaan (transl. "Desire") is a 1953 Indian Hindi-language romantic drama film directed and produced by Fali Mistry. The music is composed by S. D. Burman. Armaan revolves around Radha (Madhubala), a peasant girl who is fostered by her dead father's loyal servant Ramdas (Jagirdar) so that she does not fall in clutches of her treacherous uncle Bahadur Singh (K. N. Singh). Dev Anand stars as Radha's love interest, Madan.

Theatrically released on 19 August 1953, Armaan received mixed reviews from critics and failed at the box office. However, it was better received abroad, particularly in Singapore, where The Straits Times hailed it as "one of the best Indian pictures to be shown in the East since the war".

== Plot ==
Ramdas, a poor noble soul rears up the only daughter of his dead master away from his own home so that she may not fall into the clutches of her treacherous uncle, Bahadur Singh. Baby Radha grows up to be a beautiful girl and falls in love with the poet Madan, who happens to visit her village. Fate separates them and Radha is taken over by her uncle and taught to outgrow her peasant upbringing to become a swell girl. But her love for her foster father, now a dispiriterd rickshaw puller, flames again leading up to a climax.

== Cast ==
- Dev Anand as Madan
- Madhubala as Radha
- Shakila as Roopa
- K. N. Singh as Bahadur Singh
- Jagirdar as Ramdas

== Soundtrack ==
All music was composed by S. D. Burman, all film songs were written by Sahir Ludhianvi.

Song	Singer
"Krodh Kapat Ke Andhiyare"	Manna Dey
"Jadubhari Yeh Fizayen, Sochta Hai Kaya"	Geeta Dutt
"Yeh Hansi, Yeh Khushi"	Geeta Dutt
"Bharam Teri Wafaon Ka"	Talat Mahmood
"Bol Na Bol Ae Janewale, Sun To Le Deewanon Ki"	Talat Mahmood, Asha Bhosle
"Chahe Kitna Mujhe Tum Bhulao Ji, Nahin Bhoolingi"	Asha Bhosle
"Main Pankh Lagake Udd Jawun Aur Phir Na Palat Ke Aawun"	Asha Bhosle
"Jab Duniya Badli Hai, Phir Kyun Na Badle"	Asha Bhosle

== Reception ==
Armaan was a box office flop in India. It was one of those films whose failure led to Madhubala getting labelled a "jinx" in the media.

The journal Thought was critical of the plot, calling it a "sentimentalized rehash of a mediocre story", and of Anand's "limited acting skills". On the contrary, a review by The Indian Express appreciated the acting of Jagirdar, as well as the music and the cinematography.

=== International reception ===
Armaan was better received in Singapore, where it was hailed by The Straits Times as "one of the best Indian pictures to be shown in the East since the war", adding that while musical interruptions may be disturbing for foreign audiences, they are compensated for by Madhubala's "grace and loveliness".

The Sunday Standard also favorably reviewed the film, describing it as "well made and presented" and praising the performances, particularly that of Jagirdar. It added: "There is much here to recommend in this film — and Arman has much in it so recommend itself to fans of Indian movies." Another review by The Indian Mail appreciated the performances of Madhubala and Dev Anand, lamenting that the latter "is not given enough scope [...] to display his histrionic talents".
