= Nigar Sultana (actress) =

Indian actress (1932–2000)

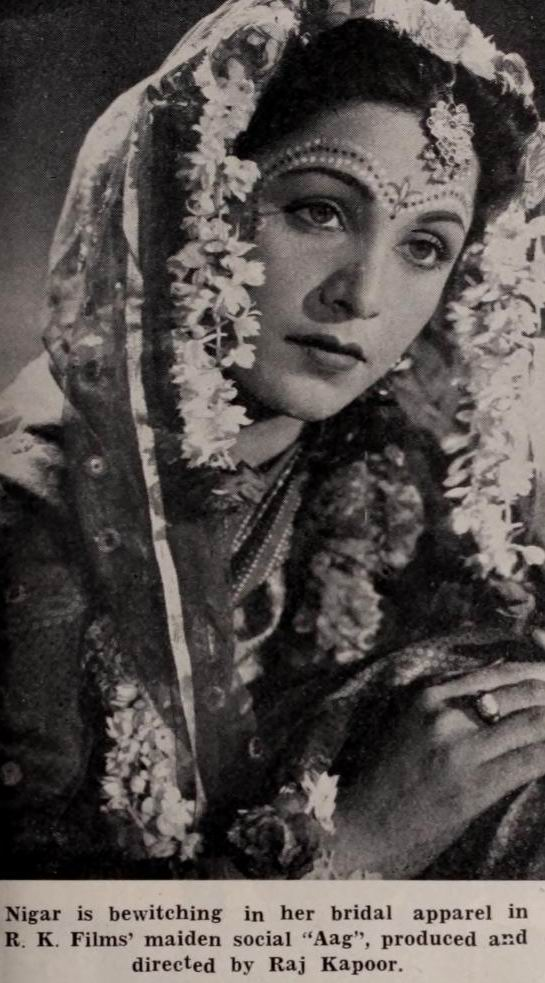
- Born: 21 June 1932; Hyderabad, Hyderabad State, British India
- Died: 21 April 2000 (aged 67); Mumbai, Maharashtra, India
- Occupation: Actress
- Years active: 1946 – 1986
- Spouse(s): S. M. Yusuf (divorced); K. Asif
- Children: 6
- Relatives: Chitra (niece)

Nigar Sultana (21 June 1932 – 21 April 2000) was an Indian actress who worked in Hindi films. She appeared in Aag (1948), Patanga (1949), Sheesh Mahal (1950), Mirza Ghalib (1954), Yahudi (1958), Do Kaliyaan (1968) but is most notably remembered for playing the role of Bahar Begum in the historical epic film Mughal-e-Azam (1960). She was the wife of filmmaker K. Asif.

== Early life and education ==
Nigar Sultana was born on 21 June 1932 in Hyderabad, India. She was the youngest daughter of a family of five siblings. She had two brothers and two sisters. She spent her childhood in Hyderabad where her father held the rank of a Major in the Nizam's State Army.

She went to school for a while and later studied at home. She took part in a school drama on one occasion and ever after was keen on acting.

== Career ==
The first film Nigar saw was Hum Tum Aur Woh (1938). She was so utterly thrilled by it that when Jagdish Sethi, a friend of her father's, offered her the lead in a film he was making with Mohan Bhavnani, she took it on the spot.

She entered the film industry with the 1946 film Rangbhoomi. Raj Kapoor's Aag (1948) was her first big break in Hindi films. She played the character of "Nirmala", which was equally appreciated by critics and audience. After that, she played character roles in a number of films.

Her first big film was Shikayat (1948), made in Poona; then came Bela (1947), a Ranjit production, and after that many more in which she played leading roles. She played the role of the court dancer Bahar, who envies Prince Salim's (Dilip Kumar) love for Anarkali (Madhubala) in the film Mughal-e-Azam (1960). The songs Teri Mehfil Mein Qismat and Jab Raat Hai Aisi Matwali were picturised on her. Dara (1953) and Khyber, Patanga (1949), Dil Ki Basti (1949), Sheesh Mahal (1950), Khel (1950), Daman (1951), Anand Bhavan (1953), Mirza Ghalib (1954), Tankhah (1956), Durgesh Nandini (1956) and Yahudi (1958) are among her noted movies. She was most active during the 1950s and appeared in fewer movies later. Jumbish: A Movement – The Movie in 1986 is her last Hindi film.

== Personal life ==
Nigar Sultana was linked with Pakistani actor Darpan Kumar. On 13 June 1959, she held a press conference specifically to deny reports that she had married the Pakistani actor.

Later, Nigar Sultana married K. Asif, producer-director of Mughal-e-Azam (1960). Their daughter was actress Heena Kausar. Heena Kausar appeared in secondary roles in a large number of films during the 1970s and early 1980s.

Two actresses of the 1950s, sisters Chitra (born Afsar-un-nisa) and Paras (born Yusuf-un-nisa) are Nigar Sultana's nieces.

== Death ==
Nigar Sultana died on 21 April 2000 in Mumbai, India.

== Filmography ==
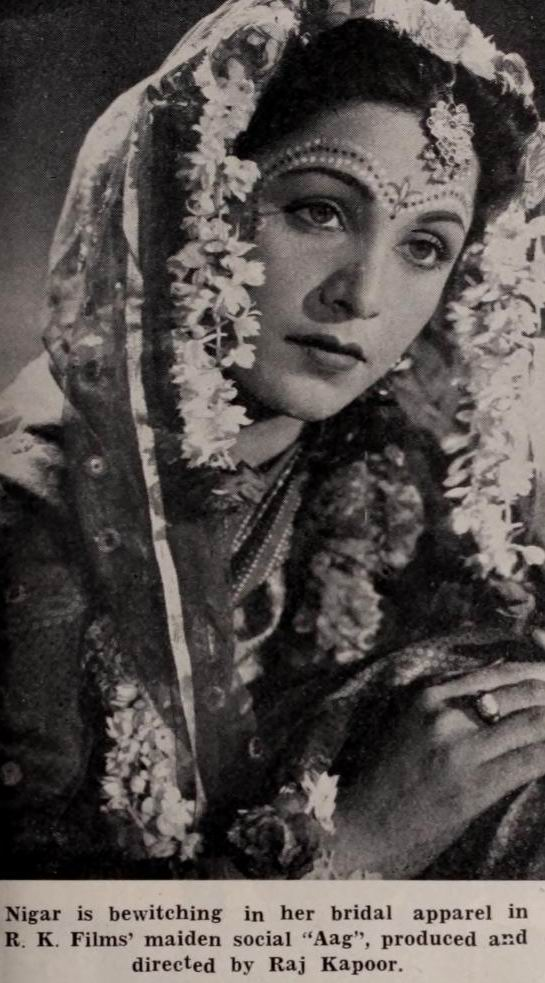
Sultana in Aag (1948)

- Rangbhoomi (1946) (her debut film)
- 1857 (1946)
- Bela (1947)
- Shikayat (1948)
- Nao (1948)
- Mitti Ke Khiloune (1948)
- Aag aka Fire (1948)
- Patanga (1949)
- Sunehre Din (1949)
- Bazaar (1949)
- Balam (1949)
- Sheesh Mahal (1950)
- Khel (1950)
- Khamosh Sipahi (1950)
- Phoolan Ke Haar (1951)
- Daman (1951)
- Hyderabad Ki Nazneen (1952)
- Anand Bhawan (1953)
- Rishta (1954)
- Mirza Ghalib (1954)
- Mastana (1954)
- Mangu (1954)
- Khaibar (1954)
- Sardar (1955)
- Umer Marvi (1956)
- Durgesh Nandini (1956 film) (1956)
- Yahudi (1958)
- Commander (1959)
- Mughal-e-Azam (1960)
- Raaz Ki Baat (1962)
- Taj Mahal
- Mere Hamdam Mere Dost (1968)
- Do Kaliyaan (1968)
- Bansi Birju (1972)
- Jumbish: A Movement-The Movie (1986)
