= Patanga (1949 film) =

- Directed by: H. S. Rawail
- Written by: Rajendra Krishan
- Screenplay by: Anjana Rawail
- Story by: Anjana Rawail
- Starring: Nigar Sultana; Shyam; Yakub; Gope
- Cinematography: Jamshed R. Irani
- Edited by: Prabhakar Gokhale
- Music by: C. Ramchandra
- Production company: Varma Films
- Distributed by: Varma Films
- Release date: 1949
- Running time: 143 mins.
- Country: India
- Language: Hindi

Patanga is a 1949 Indian Hindi-language romantic comedy film. It was the first film produced and distributed by Varma Films; and it was the seventh highest grossing Indian film of 1949. The film was directed by H. S. Rawail based on a story written by his wife Anjana Rawail. Rajendra Kumar, who would become one of the leading actors in Indian cinema, worked in Patanga as an assistant to director H.S. Rawail and also had a cameo in the film. A duet sung against the backdrop of WW2, "Mere Piya Gaye Rangoon", picturised on actor Gope and Mohana Cabral became popular. The playback singers for the song were C. Ramchandra, who also composed the music for the film, and Shamshad Begum. The cast included Nigar Sultana, Shyam, Yakub, Gope, Purnima, Shyama, Randhir and Mohana.

== Plot ==
The plot revolves around the life of Raja (Yakub), a traffic constable. One day, while on his job, he gets distracted by the song being sung by Rani (Nigar Sultana), a street singer, and leaves his traffic station. This led to a serious traffic accident and Raja is suspended from his job for a year without pay. Rani decides to help Raja and both of them find acting jobs at Gope Theater run by Natharam Gope (Gope).

All seems to be going well with Raja and Rani until Shyam (Shyam), the son of a wealthy Jagirdar (landlord) enters the picture. While watching Rani on stage, Shyam falls in love with her. So begins the classic love triangle that emerges when two men are in love with the same woman. What complicates this love triangle is that Raja just cannot get himself to let Rani know that he is in love with her and seeking more than a friendship. Further complicating this love triangle is that Shyam is already betrothed to Purnima (Purnima) and his love for Rani does not sit well with her. The film progresses with the resolution of the conflicts that arise in this complex love triangle.

== Cast ==
- Shyam as Shyam
- Nigar Sultana as Rani
- Yakub as Raja
- Gope as Nathuram Gope
- Purnima as Purnima
- Shyama as Mali's Wife
- Cuckoo as dancer
- Raj Mehra as watchman of Gope Theatre
- Iftekhar as Gardener
- Randhir as Shyam's friend
- Mohana Cabral as Jwala
- Ramesh Sinha
- Rajendra Kumar
- Khairati as Bhusham M.A

== Music ==
"Mera Piya Gaye Rangoon" sung by Shamshad Begum and C Ramchandra under his playback name of Chitalkar became an evergreen hit.

Song	Singer
"O Janewale"	Lata Mangeshkar
"Dil Se Bhula Do Tum"	Lata Mangeshkar
"Kabhi Khamosh Ho Jana"	Lata Mangeshkar
"Pyar Ke Jahan Ki Nirali Sarkar Hai"	Lata Mangeshkar, Shamshad Begum
"Mere Piya Gaye Rangoon, Kiya Hai Wahan Se"	C. Ramchandra, Shamshad Begum
"Dil Ka Lagana Achha Hai Par Kabhi Kabhi"	C. Ramchandra, Shamshad Begum
"Bolo Ji Dil Loge To Kya Kya Doge"	Mohammed Rafi, Shamshad Begum
"Pehle To Ho Gayi Namaste Namaste, Phir Pyar Ho Gaya Hanste Hanste"	C. Ramchandra, Mohammed Rafi, Shamshad Begum, Mohantara
"Gore Gore Mukhde Pe"	Shamshad Begum
"Duniya Ko Pyare"	Shamshad Begum
