= Do Premee =

- Directed by: Raj Khosla
- Written by: Gulshan Nanda
- Screenplay by: Raj Bharti
- Story by: Gulshan Nanda
- Produced by: Kundan A. Thadani; Sudesh Issar
- Starring: Rishi Kapoor; Moushumi Chatterjee; Om Prakash; I. S. Johar; Deven Verma
- Cinematography: Fali Mistry
- Edited by: Waman B. Bhosle
- Music by: Laxmikant-Pyarelal
- Release date: 11 January 1980
- Running time: 134 minutes
- Country: India
- Language: Hindi

Do Premee (transl. The two lovers) is a 1980 Indian Hindi-language romance film produced by Kundan A. Thadani. Directed by Raj Khosla, the film stars Rishi Kapoor and Moushumi Chatterjee in lead roles, along with Om Prakash, I. S. Johar, Deven Verma; music has been composed by Laxmikant–Pyarelal.

== Plot ==
This is a love story of Chetan (Rishi Kapoor) and Payal (Moushumi Chatterjee). They love each other very much and want to get married. They confess their love to their fathers Daulatram (I. S. Johar) and Bhagwant Singh (Om Prakash) respectively, but their fathers are not happy with their children's choice and they want them to marry their own choice life partner. As their fathers are not happy so couple finds way elope and get married. Bhagwant Singh gives an advertisement in the newspaper to get the information on his daughter and offers a good reward for the same. On the other hand, Chetan is looking for a job and manage to get a job as a car driver and Payal works as a maid. Later Chetan and Payal come to know a dark secret of their employer that endangers their life!

== Cast ==
- Rishi Kapoor as Chetan
- Moushumi Chatterjee as Payal / Parvati
- Geeta Behl as Geeta
- Om Prakash as Retired Colonel Bhagwant Singh
- I. S. Johar as Daulatram
- Deven Verma as Murari Bhonsle
- Roopesh Kumar as Suresh
- Bhagwan Dada as Bhagwan
- K. N. Singh as Geeta's uncle
- Raj Kumar Kapoor (Raj Bharti) as Gurudev/Dragon/Mahayogi/Shivlal
- Raj Kishore as Pandit at Temple
- Piloo Wadia as Typist at Nisha Ads
- M.L. Nawab as marriage registrar
- Gautam Sarin as Police Inspector
- Aruna Irani as Special Appearance in song "Allah, Meri Payal Bole Chhan Chhan"

== Crew ==
- Director - Raj Khosla
- Producer - Kundan A. Thadani
- Story - Gulshan Nanda, G.R. Kamat
- Writer - Gulshan Nanda, G.R. Kamat
- Dialogue - Rahi Masoom Reza
- Editor - Waman B. Bhosle
- Cinematographer - Fali Mistry
- Screenplay - Raj Bharti
- Art Director - Ram Yedekar
- Costume Designer - Padma U. Thadani, Reshma K. Thadani
- Choreographer - Kamal
- Camera - R. Nair, Magan Singh

== Music ==
All lyrics were provided by Anand Bakshi and music is written by Laxmikant-Pyarelal.

Song	Singer
"Mubarak Ho, Mubarak Ho, Mubarak Ho"	Kishore Kumar, Manna Dey
"Prem Ka Rog Laga"	Kishore Kumar
"Allah, Meri Payal Bole"	Lata Mangeshkar
"Payaliya Chhanki Ke Na, Chhanki Chhanki"	Mohammed Rafi, Anuradha Paudwal
"Mausam Pe Jawani Hai"	Mohammed Rafi, Asha Bhosle
"Pyar Kar, Pyar Kar"	Mohammed Rafi, Asha Bhosle
