= Khel (1950 film) =

- Directed by: S. M. Nawab
- Written by: Zia Sarhadi
- Starring: Nargis; Dev Anand
- Music by: Sajjad Hussain
- Release date: 1950
- Country: India
- Language: Hindi

Khel is a 1950 Indian Hindi-language film directed by S. M. Nawab, and produced under the banner of Shahin Pictures. Sajjad Hussain composed the music. The film was written by Zia Sarhadi, and starred Nargis and Dev Anand. Other members of the cast included Hafiz Jehan, Nigar Sultana, Anwar, Murad and Neelam.
