= Bhai-Bhai (1970 film) =

1970 film

- Directed by: Raja Nawathe
- Written by: S. Ali Raza; Nabban
- Produced by: Ratan Mohan
- Starring: Sunil Dutt; Asha Parekh; Mumtaz; Mehmood; Pran
- Cinematography: K. H. Kapadia
- Edited by: K. Prabhakar
- Music by: Shankar–Jaikishan
- Production company: R. M. Arts Productions
- Distributed by: R. M. Arts Productions
- Release date: 7 April 1970
- Country: India
- Language: Hindi

Bhai-Bhai (transl. Brothers) is a 1970 Bollywood suspense drama film directed by Raja Nawathe. It had music by Shankar Jaikishen with lyrics by Hasrat Jaipuri. The film stars Sunil Dutt (in double role), Asha Parekh, Mumtaz, Mehmood and Pran. It performed well at the box office.

The story revolves around Sunil Dutt, playing the role of a writer and a student. The writer's character from his story seemingly comes to life killing people which puts him under suspicion from the police. The movie was remade in tamil as Karunthel Kannayiram with Jaishankar.

== Cast ==
- Sunil Dutt as Deep / Ashok "Sangram"(double role)
- Asha Parekh as Laj
- Mumtaz as Bijli
- Mehmood as Johnny
- Pran
- Jeevan (Hindi actor)
- Raj Mehra
- Aruna Irani
- Madan Puri
- Mukri
- Leela Chitnis
- Manmohan Krishna
- Iftekhar
- Mohan Choti
- Sunder
- Asit Sen

== Soundtrack ==
The film had music composed by Shankar Jaikishan with lyrics written by Hasrat Jaipuri and S. H. Bihari. The playback singing was provided by Lata Mangeshkar, Asha Bhosle and Mohammed Rafi.

=== Song list ===
Song	Singer
"Mere Mehboob"	Mohammed Rafi
"Main Hoon Jaani Tera"	Mohammed Rafi
"Ek Tera Sundar Mukhda"	Mohammed Rafi
"Main To Kajra Lagake"	Lata Mangeshkar
"Sapera Been Baja"	Lata Mangeshkar
"Aaj Raat Hai Jawan"	Asha Bhosle
