= Chori Chori (1956 film) =

- Film poster
- Directed by: Anant Thakur
- Written by: Agha Jani Kashmiri
- Screenplay by: Agha Jani Kashmiri
- Based on: It Happened One Night (1934)
- Produced by: L. B. Lachman
- Starring: Raj Kapoor; Nargis
- Cinematography: V. N. Reddy
- Edited by: S. Surya
- Music by: Shankar-Jaikishan
- Production company: AVM Productions
- Distributed by: AVM Productions
- Release date: 1956
- Running time: 158 min.
- Country: India
- Language: Hindi
- Budget: ₹ 0.4 crore
- Box office: ₹6.04 crore

Chori Chori

Chori Chori (transl. Stealthily) is a 1956 Indian Hindi-language romantic comedy film directed by Anant Thakur. It stars Raj Kapoor, Nargis in the lead roles. Pran, Johnny Walker, Gope, David, Mukri, Bhagwan Dada have character parts. It is an adaptation of the 1934 American film It Happened One Night. This was the last film of Nargis and Raj Kapoor together as leads, with Nargis doing one cameo appearance in the Raj Kapoor starrer Jagte Raho (1956).

Music was composed by Shankar-Jaikishan and lyrics were written by Hasrat Jaipuri and Shailendra. The music of Chori Chori had popular tracks including romantic songs "Aaja Sanam Madhur Chandni Mein", "Yeh Raat Bheegi Bheegi", "Jahan Mein Jaati Hoon Wahi Chale Aate Ho", by Lata Mangeshkar and Manna Dey and comedy number "Sawa Lakh Ki Lottery," by Lata Mangeshkar and Mohammad Rafi. The film was later entirely remastered and colourised.

== Plot ==
Kammo (Nargis) lives a wealthy lifestyle with her widowed multi-millionaire dad, Girhdari Lal (Gope). He would like her to marry someone who is not after their wealth. To his dismay, she chooses to marry a pilot named Sumankumar (Pran), who is known for womanising and greed. When he disapproves, she runs away from home. The news of her running is announced on the radio and newspaper, offering a reward of ₹1.25 lakhs for her safe return. On the run, she decides to go by bus to meet Suman. A free-lance reporter Sagar (Raj Kapoor) in search of a story is also going to Bangalore to get advance from his editor. An auto owner cum driver Bhagwan sees the news of a reward and goes with his wife to find Kammo. The first encounter of Kammo and Sagar in the bus starts with a tiff. After a night's journey full of tiffs the bus stops for passengers to eat snacks. Kammo wanders off and Sagar sees the news of her running and thinks that it will be a good story. She misses the bus and Sagar also lets it go for his scoop. They catch the next bus, in the bus a poet (Johnny Walker) bores her by reciting his poems at that point Sagar comes to her rescue claiming to be her husband. Midway through the journey the bus breaks down and they take a room in Banwari's (David) inn where only married couples are allowed. They share a room and make a partition with a bed sheet. The comic situation brings them closer. Kammo spends all the money to buy toiletries, etc. They start walking the next 7 km to Bangalore. Kammo falls in love with the simple life of villages. They spent the night in the open where Bhagwan spots them. In the confusion of the melee they escape with auto and take a room in Madarilal's (Mukri) inn with a promise to clear rent on check out. The adventure of the journey and facing situations together bonds them and they fall in love with each other. Deciding to marry Kammo, Sagar goes to Bangalore to get advance from his editor, leaving a note, while Kammo is still sleeping. The editor gives him cheque which takes time to cash. Meanwhile in the morning the Madarilal's wife humiliates Kammo and throws her out as she does not have money to pay. Kammo thinks that Sagar has abandoned her for story. She phones her father from a house and asks him to come and take her home. Coming back Sagar sees her motorcade going. He thinks she has left her. Both feel let down and dejected. He buys the auto from Bhagwan from advance money.

Kammo has come of age and misses Sagar. Seeing her sad Girdhari Lal fixes her marriage with Suman. The news of marriage is flashed in papers. On the day of marriage a press conference is held to click the picture of bride and for QA. At the end of the conference when all are gone Sagar demands money, assuming he wants reward money the father gives him cheque of ₹1.25 lakhs. Sagar tears off the cheque and submits a bill for 15 rupees 12 annas for the expenses incurred during their journey. Misunderstanding over she again runs away with Sagar on the same auto but this time with the consent of her father to live happily ever after.

== Cast ==
- Raj Kapoor as Sagar
- Nargis as Kammo
- Pran as Suman Kumar
- Johnny Walker as Shayar
- Gope as Girdharilal
- David as Banwarilal
- Mukri as Madarilal
- Bhagwan Dada as Bhagwan
- Rajasulochana as Bhagwan's Wife
- Indira Bansal as Shayar's Wife
- Ameer Banoo as Madarilal's Wife
- Maruti as Postal Employee
- Raj Mehra as Editor
- Neelam as Girdharilal's Secretary
- K. V. Shanthi as Dancer
- Kumari Kamala as Dancer
- Sayee & Subbalakshmi as Dancers

== Awards ==
- Filmfare Award for Best Music Director - Shankar-Jaikishan

== Soundtrack ==
The music of this film was composed by Shankar-Jaikishan and won them Filmfare Award for Best Music Director. The starting melody of the song "Aaja Sanam Madhur Chandni Mein" was adapted from the traditional Italian folk song, "Tarantella Napoletana".

Song	Singer	Raga
"Le Chal O Majhi Kinare"	Lata Mangeshkar	
"Rasik Balma Haay"	Lata Mangeshkar	Shuddh Kalyan
"Panchhi Banoon"	Lata Mangeshkar	Bhoopali
"Jahan Mein Jaati Hoon Wahi Chale Aate Ho"	Lata Mangeshkar, Manna Dey	
"Aaja Sanam Madhur Chandni Mein Hum Tum"	Lata Mangeshkar, Manna Dey	
"Yeh Raat Bheegi Bheegi Yeh Mast Fizayen"	Lata Mangeshkar, Manna Dey	Kirwani
"Manbhaavan Ke Ghar Jaaye Gori"	Lata Mangeshkar, Asha Bhosle	
"Sawa Lakh Ki Lottery Bhejo Apne Bhi Naam Ji"	Lata Mangeshkar, Mohammed Rafi	
"All Line Clear"	Mohammed Rafi	
Bharatanatyam Thillana	M. L. Vasanthakumari	Ragamalika
