= Parvarish (1958 film) =

- Directed by: Shanu Banerjee
- Written by: Sagar Usmani; Syed Mohammed Abbas
- Produced by: Mahipatray Shah
- Starring: Raj Kapoor; Mala Sinha; Mehmood
- Cinematography: C. S. Puttu
- Edited by: Ramchandra Mahadik
- Music by: Dattaram Wadkar
- Production company: Roopkala Pictures
- Release date: 1958
- Country: India
- Language: Hindi

Parvarish (transl. Upbringing) is a 1958 Hindi-language film produced by Mahipatray Shah and directed by Shanu Banerjee (S. Banerjee) starring Raj Kapoor, Mala Sinha, Mehmood in the lead roles. It was later adapted into the Tamil play Petral Thaan Pillaiya, which in turn was adapted into the Tamil film Paar Magaley Paar (1963).

== Plot ==
After a hospital accident, a wealthy man is compelled to adopt a prostitute's son. After the incident, Thakur Jaswant takes both the infants with him. They wait for the guardian of the other child. As they are not able to make out which child is whose.

After some days, a man named Banke Bihari comes to meet Jaswant. He tells him that the other child, who is the son of a prostitute, is his nephew, and the prostitute was his sister. The lady left this world after giving birth to her son in that fire accident. So, he wants to take the other child with him. But he is also unable to identify which child is his nephew. Jaswant then brings up both the children as his own. This thing insults him in society as he has adopted a prostitute's son. All his friends and partners refuse to marry their daughters to any of Jaswant's sons. But his friends promise to marry his daughter to Jaswant's son.

As time passes 3 of the children grow up. Things take a turn when both the boys want to marry the same girl.

== Cast ==
- Raj Kapoor as Raja Singh
- Mala Sinha as Asha Singh
- Mehmood as Ramesh Singh
- Nazir Hussain as Thakur Jaswant Singh
- Lalita Pawar as Thakurain Rukmani Singh
- Krishnakant as Thakur Harnam Singh "Bade Thakur"
- Radhakrishan as Ustad Banke Bihari "Mama"
- Brahm Bhardwaj as Doctor
- Jennifer Murray as Dancer/Singer

== Soundtrack ==
The lyrics were penned by Hasrat Jaipuri while the music was given by Dattaram Wadkar.

Song	Singer	Raga
"Aansoo Bhari Hai Yeh Jeevan Ki Raahen"	Mukesh	Yaman Kalyan
"Looti Zindagi Aur"	Lata Mangeshkar	
"Mastibhara Hai Sama Hum Tum Hain Dono Yahan"	Lata Mangeshkar, Manna Dey	
"Beliya Beliya Beliya Beliya"	Lata Mangeshkar, Manna Dey	
"Mama O Mama O Mama Mama Mama"	Mohammed Rafi, Manna Dey	
"Jane Kaisa Jadu Kiya Re Bedardi Balam"	Sudha Malhotra, Asha Bhosle	
"Jhoome Re Jhoome Re"	Asha Bhosle	
