= Ashiana (1952 film) =

- Directed by: B. Trilochan
- Written by: Umesh Mathur
- Story by: Arjun Dev Rashk
- Produced by: B. Swinder Sabharwal
- Starring: Raj Kapoor; Nargis
- Cinematography: V. Avadhoot
- Edited by: G. G. Mayekar
- Music by: Madan Mohan
- Production company: Sabharwals Productions
- Distributed by: Sabharwals Productions
- Release date: 1 August 1952
- Country: India
- Language: Hindi

Ashiana is a 1952 Hindi language romantic movie produced by B. Swinder Sabharwal. The film is directed by B. Trilochan. The film stars Raj Kapoor and Nargis in lead roles along with Iftekhar, Randhir and Shivraj. The film's music was composed by Madan Mohan and lyrics were written by Rajinder Krishan. The film was based on a story written by Arjun Dev Rashk.

== Plot ==
Raju and Gaura are living in a beautiful village that has hills and mountains subsiding near to the village. Both of them were in love since their childhood and promised to hold together and get married. Jeevan a mutual friend of both Raju and Gaura becomes obsessed with Gaura and tries to part their relationship. He poisons Gaura's father and later tries to bring a quarrel between Raju and his brother. But all of his efforts turns in vain. Later Raju gets imprisoned for murder of Jeevan when Raju saves Gaura from being assaulted by Jeevan. Gaura's father tries to get Gaura married to another young man in the village as he do not want his daughter to marry a murderer. Standing by the window while her father was convincing her to get married, Gaura gets killed falling through the window to the lake. Though no one informs Raju of Gaura's death at that moment, later when he came to know about the incident he never believes it. The main reason was that her body was not yet retrieved from the lake. He kept looking for her but he was not disappointed unable to find her. He came upon the toy which he had made for her during their childhood. It was a symbol of their love. Later on he started seeing her and started talking to her as he looked at the toy. Thus the story is a clear picturisation of how true love remains even after death.

== Cast ==
- Raj Kapoor as Raju
- Nargis as Gaura
- Iftekhar as Jeevan
- Shivraj as Dwarkanath
- Randhir as Inder
- Mohana Cabral as Reeta Darjeeling
- Surinder as Surinder Junior
- Master Ratan as Young Jeevan
- Ratan Gaurang as Young Raju
- Baby Sandhana as Young Gaura
- Om Sharma
- D S Dewan
- Kusum

== Soundtrack ==
Song	Singer
"Main Pagal"	Talat Mahmood
"Mera Karaar Le Ja (Male)	Talat Mahmood
"Mera Karaar Le Ja" (Female)	Lata Mangeshkar
"Mere Piya Se Koi Jake"	Lata Mangeshkar
"Mukh Mod Na Lena Sajna"	Lata Mangeshkar
"Tum Chand Ke Sath"	Lata Mangeshkar
"Sama Hai Bahar Ka"	Lata Mangeshkar
"Main Na Jaanun"	Lata Mangeshkar
"O Madam, Do Se Ho Gaye Ek Hum, Na Phanka, Na Gham"	Shamshad Begum, Kishore Kumar
