= Banwra =

- Directed by: G. Rakesh
- Starring: Raj Kapoor; Nimmi
- Music by: Krishan Dayal
- Release date: 1950
- Country: India
- Language: Hindi

Banwra is 1950 Bollywood film directed by G. Rakesh, pseudonym of Raghupat Roy Kapur, grandfather of actor Aditya Roy Kapoor. It stars Raj Kapoor, Nimmi in lead roles.

== Cast ==
- Raj Kapoor
- Nimmi
- K. N. Singh
- Lalita Pawar
- Ratan Kumar

== Music ==
Song	Singer
"Sahil Jo Dubo De Kashti"	Mohammed Rafi
"Shama Jalti Hai To Parwane Chale Aate Hai" (Duet)	Mohammed Rafi, Geeta Dutt
"Meri Duniya Ki Shayad"	Geeta Dutt
"Do Din Ka Mela Hai"	Geeta Dutt
"Aaja Aaja Aaja Aaja"	Geeta Dutt
"Shama Jalti Hai To" (Solo)	Lata Mangeshkar
"Zulmi Naina Balam Ke"	Lata Mangeshkar
"Is Dil Ka Bangla Khali"	Shamshad Begum
