= Jan Pahchan =

- Directed by: Fali Mistry
- Written by: Ramanand Sagar; R.P. Sharma
- Produced by: Fali Mistry; Robin Chaterjee
- Starring: Raj Kapoor; Nargis; Jeevan
- Music by: Manna Dey; Khemchand Prakash; Cecil Mendoza
- Release date: 1950
- Country: India
- Language: Hindi

Jan Pahchan is a 1950 Hindi-language film directed by Fali Mistry, and starring Raj Kapoor and Nargis in lead roles, with Jeevan, Shama Dulari, Neelam and Sankatha in supporting roles. The producers are Robin Chatterjee and Fali Mistry. The film's music was composed by Manna Dey (as Mana Dey), Cecil Mendoza and Khemchand Prakash. The film was based on a story written by Ramanand Sagar and R.P. Sharma.

== Plot ==
Asha is a very poor woman from a village who is living with her mother and blind father. When her mother dies, her father marries another woman named Rukmani who is very abusive to Asha. Rukmani wants Asha to marry an old villager named Lallu, but her plan fails. Meanwhile, an artist named Anil comes to the village to stay with his friend Jeevan. Anil and Asha fall in love but their affair is kept secret. Later Asha becomes pregnant. Anil suffers from an accident when he returns from his hometown after seeing his dying father. Anil is reluctant to meet Asha as his face gets disfigured in the accident. In order to save Asha from being shamed, Jeevan takes responsibility for Asha's pregnancy. Later Asha returns and meets Anil again.

== Cast ==
- Nargis as Asha
- Raj Kapoor as Anil
- Jeevan as Jeevan
- Shama Dulari
- Neelam
- Amar
- Sankatha Prashad
- Amir Banoo
- Mukri as Lallu

== Soundtrack ==
Song	Singer
"Armanbhare Dil Ki Lagan Tere Liye Hai"	Talat Mahmood, Geeta Dutt
"Bhulnewale Tujhe Apni"	Geeta Dutt
"Nain Mila Ke Dil Cheena"	Geeta Dutt
"Duniya Mohabbat Karne"	Geeta Dutt
"Pardesi Se Lag Gayi Preet"	Geeta Dutt
"Aaoge Na Sajan, Aaoge Na"	Geeta Dutt
"Zamana Ulfat Ke Gun Gaye"	Rajkumari
"Dukh Se Bhara Hua Hai"	Shankar Dasgupta
"Hum Kya Batayen"	Shankar Dasgupta
