= Fali Mistry =

Indian cinematographer

- Born: February 17, 1917
- Died: December 16, 1979 (aged 62)
- Occupations: Cinematographer; Producer; Director
- Years active: 1942 - 1979
- Known for: Guide (1965)
- Spouse: Shyama (m. 1953)
- Relatives: Jal Mistry (younger brother)

Fali Mistry (17 February 1917 – 16 December 1979) was an Indian cinematographer, who worked in Bollywood films, from the 1940s to 1980, both in black and white and colour cinema, and along with younger brother Jal Mistry, he was one of the most acclaimed cinematographers of his era. He also produced and directed a few films.

He won the Filmfare Award for Best Cinematographer twice, Guide (colour) (1967) and Fakira (1977).

== Early life ==
Mistry was born in Bombay on 17 February 1917 to a Parsi family. His younger brother Jal Mistry, also became a cinematographer.

== Career ==
Mistry first received acclaim for his work in film Amrapali (1945), directed by Nandlal Jaswantlal. He was a stalwart of Navketan Films, after the critical acclaim of Guide (1967) directed by Vijay Anand, which also won him a Filmfare Award, Mistry worked in a number of films directed by his elder brother Dev Anand, including Prem Pujari (1970), Hare Rama Hare Krishna (1971), Heera Panna (1973), Ishq Ishq Ishq (1974), Des Pardes (1978).

He directed three feature films, including, Jan Pahchan (1950), Armaan (1953) and Sazaa (1951) starring Dev Anand, The film also noted for its music by SD Burman in songs Tum Na Jaaney Kis Jehan Mein Kho Gaye sung by Lata Mangeshkar.

Along with his younger brother, Jal Mistry (1923 - 15 April 2000), the Mistry brothers made a name for themselves in Bollywood. Their work exemplified influences of Hollywood and European cinema. In time, he became known for his glamorous lighting, with diffusers and low-key lighting in night sequences. His work in Vyjayanthimala and Pradeep Kumar starrer, Nagin (1954) is especially noted for use of diffusers, and high-contrast lighting to create graphic art like effect and composition. He became an influential cinematographer and inspired other technicians, noted cinematographer V.K. Murthy who made name in Guru Dutt classic, Pyaasa, Kaagaz Ke Phool and Sahib Bibi Aur Gulam, worked as his assistant, and in an interview mentioned Amrapali (1945) as the most inspiring cinematographic work ..during those days..

He died on 16 December 1979 at the age of 62.

== Personal life ==
He married actress Shyama in 1954, she was noted for films like Aar Paar (1954) and Barsaat Ki Raat (1960). He was 37 and she was 19 at the time of their love marriage. They kept their marriage hidden for a couple of years so that Shyama's career as both the heroine or side-actress alongside her fan following remains unaffected. Their marriage came to public notice only after the birth of their elder son Faroukh during the early 1960s. The couple had two sons Faroukh and Rohinton and a daughter Shirrin. Shyama lived in her South Mumbai flat before she died in 2017. His son Faroukh Mistry is a cinematographer and documentary filmmaker, while brother Jal Mistry was also a noted cinematographer in Hindi cinema, whose son Zubin Mistry is also a cinematographer based in London. Faroukh's previous film to hit the theatres was Angrezi Mein Kehte Hain (2017).

== Filmography ==
Cinematographer

- Mata (1942)
- Amrapali (1945)
- Mela (1948)
- Babul (1950)
- Nagin (1954)
- Taj (1956)
- Ek Musafir Ek Hasina (1962)
- Guide (1967)
- Neel Kamal (1968)
- Humsaya (1968)
- Prem Pujari (1970)
- The Evil Within (1970)
- Johny Mera Naam (1970)
- Hare Rama Hare Krishna (1971)
- Manchali (1973)
- Heera Panna (1973)
- Joshila (1973)
- Ishq Ishq Ishq (1974)
- Jaaneman (1976)
- Fakira (1977)
- Darling Darling (1977)
- Des Pardes (1978)
- Mr. Natwarlal (1979)
- Ram Balram (1980)
- Do Premee (1980)

Director

- Jan Pahechan (1950)
- Sazaa (1951)
- Armaan (1953)

Producer

- Jan Pahechan (1950)
- Armaan (1953)
- Taj (1956)
- Chandan (1958)

== Awards ==
- Filmfare Award
  - Best Cinematographer
    - 1967: Guide (colour)
    - 1977: Fakira
