= Pyar =

Pyar (Love)
- Directed by: V. M. Vyas
- Starring: Raj Kapoor; Nargis; Yakub; Shyama; Nawab
- Music by: S. D. Burman
- Release date: 1950
- Country: India
- Language: Hindi

Pyaar is a 1950 Hindi-language film produced and directed by V. M. Vyas, starring Raj Kapoor and Nargis in the lead roles, with Yakub, Shyama and Nawab in supporting roles. The music was composed by S. D. Burman. The film is based on a story written by Mohanlal G. Dave.

== Cast ==
- Raj Kapoor as Banke
- Nargis as Rani
- Yakub
- Shyama
- Nawab
- Kesari
- Wazir Mohammad Khan
- Gulab
- Parvati Devi

== Soundtrack ==
The music was composed by S. D. Burman, with lyrics by Rajendra Krishan. It marked the only time Kishore Kumar sung for Raj Kapoor.

Song	Singer
"Jalti Hai Duniya, Tera Mera Pyar Hai"	Kishore Kumar, Shamshad Begum
"Kachchi Pakki Sadkon Pe"	Kishore Kumar
"Mohabbat Ka Chota Sa Ek Aashiyana"	Kishore Kumar
"Ek Hum Aur Dusre Tum"	Kishore Kumar, Geeta Dutt
"O Bewafa Yeh To Bata Loota Chaman Kyun"	Kishore Kumar, Geeta Dutt
"Woh Sapnewali Raat Milan Ki Raat"	Geeta Dutt
"Aa Gayi Re Aa Gayi"	Geeta Dutt
"Do Din Hansaya Pyar Ne"	Geeta Dutt
"Chup Chup Chup Aa Gayi Re"	Geeta Dutt
