= Anhonee (1952 film) =

1952 Hindi film directed by Khwaja Ahmad Abbas

- Poster
- Directed by: K. A. Abbas
- Written by: K. A. Abbas
- Screenplay by: Mohsin Abdullah; V. P. Sathe; K. A. Abbas
- Story by: K. A. Abbas
- Produced by: K. A. Abbas
- Starring: Raj Kapoor; Nargis
- Cinematography: Rama Chandra
- Edited by: Mohan Rathod; D. B. Joshi
- Music by: Roshan
- Production company: Naya Sansar
- Distributed by: Naya Sansar
- Release date: 4 July 1952
- Running time: 155 minutes
- Country: India
- Language: Hindi

Anhonee (transl. The untoward) is a 1952 Indian Hindi-language psychological drama film directed by K. A. Abbas. The film stars Nargis in a double role alongside Raj Kapoor in the lead, supported by Om Prakash, Agha, David, Achla Sachdev in other prominent roles. The film had music composed by Roshan, while the lyrics were written by Ali Sardar Jafri. Nargis was highly appreciated for enacting a dual role and her performance garnered critical acclaim. Abbas attempted to explore two concepts – Geneticsm and Determinism, a theme which he experimented in Awara (1951).

== Plot ==
The film deals with the story of two sisters – Mohini & Roop (both played by Nargis) – one legitimate, raised by a courtesan and one illegitimate. As time passes by, Roop falls in love with Raj Kumar Saxena (Raj Kapoor), an advocate, who is a tenant, comes to pay the house rent to her father, but instead meets Roop. Soon they become involved in a romantic relationship and Roop convinces her father for their marriage.

As the family plans to organise a party to formally announce the wedding, Raj runs into Mohini, Roop's twin sister and learns that Mohini is the real daughter. Unable to bear this, Mohini gets into an unpleasant situation and becomes angry with Raj. Meanwhile, Roop also learns the truth and tries to save Mohini by deciding to swap the positions of both of them. During this, the marriage happens where Raj unknowingly weds Mohini. When Roop's father becomes aware of this, he dies. What will be the next?

== Cast ==
- Raj Kapoor as Advocate Raj Kumar Saxena
- Nargis as Roop Singh / Mohini Bai (Double Role)
- Om Prakash as Shyam Sundar Laddan
- Agha as Vidyasagar
- David as Munshi
- Achla Sachdev as Champa
- Badri Prasad as Thakur Harnam Singh
- Salma as Salma Mirza

== Music ==
=== Soundtrack ===
Song	Singer
"Kaha Hai Unhone Yeh"	Lata Mangeshkar
"Is Dil Ki Halat Kya Kahiye"	Lata Mangeshkar
"Zindagi Badli, Mohabbat Ka Maza Aane Laga"	Lata Mangeshkar, Rajkumari
"Mere Dil Ki Dhadkan Kya Bole, Kya Bole"	Lata Mangeshkar, Talat Mahmood
"Samake Dil Mein Hamare Zara Khayal Rahe"	Lata Mangeshkar, Talat Mahmood
"Yeh Jhilmil Karte Hue"	Talat Mahmood
"Main Dil Hoon Ek"	Talat Mahmood
"Shareefon Ki Mehfil Mein"	Rajkumari

== Production ==
K. A. Abbas, the director, had been associated with a close friend of his during the making of Dharti Ke Lal, the former's directorial debut. Abbas, along with another friend Gulshan, eventually planned to make a film. they went on to make Awaara, which became an instant hit. After the success of the film, Abbas was approached and he decided to direct a film under his own production. It was reported that Nargis had made contact with Abbas, requesting him to provide a more significant role for her. So he applied the same theme, interchanging the lead roles, and produced the story, guided by his friend V. P. Sathe and Mohsin Abdullah who co-wrote the script. They launched a new banner named "Naya Sansar", and produced the film with Nargis and Raj Kapoor in lead roles. This also marked the first occasion where an actor was cast in a dual role in a Hindi film.
