= Kanhaiya (film) =

- Directed by: Om Prakash
- Written by: Jagdish Kanwal (dialogue); D. N. Madhok (dialogue); Om Prakash (story)
- Produced by: Sant Singh; Pachhi
- Starring: Raj Kapoor; Nutan; Lalita Pawar; Madan Puri
- Cinematography: G. Singh
- Edited by: Shyam Rajput
- Music by: Shankar Jaikishan
- Release date: 7 August 1959
- Country: India
- Language: Hindi

Kanhaiya is a 1959 Hindi film produced by Sant Singh Pachhi and directed by Om Prakash. The film stars Raj Kapoor, Nutan and Lalita Pawar. The music was by Shankar Jaikishan. "Ruk Ja O Jane Wali", "Yad Aayi Adhi Rat Ko" and "Mujhe Mere Hal Par Chod Do.." are three memorable Mukesh songs related to this movie. Of these popular songs, "Ruk Ja O Jane Wali" became famous for its filming as it was sung for a bottle of local alcohol, with which a shot of Nutan roaming is also inserted to create an illusion as if it were sung for her. Raj Kapoor portrays a village drunk who does not care until she comes looking for him.

== Plot ==
Shanno (Nutan) is devoted to Lord Krishna, also known as Kanhaiya. Consequently, she often wanders off alone in the woods, dancing and singing to the flute notes of her Kanhaiya. She accidentally meets Kanhaiya (Raj Kapoor), the village drunk, and falls in his arms, assuming him to be her "Kanhaiya," the Lord Krishna. The gossip spreads that Kanhaiya and Shanno are having an affair, and in order to stay in the same village, they must get married. Shanno, still under the misconception regarding Kanhaiya, is thrilled and gives her consent. During the marriage, Shanno is shocked when she realises who "Kanhaiya" really is—the town drunk and idler who has taken advantage of her love for Lord Krishna and now insists on marrying her. What the Village Panchayat does when Shanno refuses to marry Kanhaiya, and how she is even ready to light herself on the funeral pyre to prove her piety, and how they cope when the village is swamped with plague, forms the basis for the rest of the story. At the end, Shanno realizes he really is Kanhaiya.

== Cast ==
- Raj Kapoor ... Kanhaiya
- Nutan ... Shanno
- Lalita Pawar ... Ganga (Kanhaiya's mother)
- Leela Mishra ... Paro
- Raj Mehra ... Nathumal
- Madan Puri ... Mano
- Om Prakash ... Vaidji
- Nazir Kashmiri ... villager

== Music ==
1. "Mujhe Tum Se Kuchh Bhee Naa Chahiye" – Mukesh
2. "Ruk Jaa O Jaanevaali Ruk Jaa" – Mukesh
3. "O More Saanwre Salone Piya, Tose Milne Ko Tarse Jiya" – Lata Mangeshkar
4. "Ni Baliye Rut Hai Bahaar Ki, Kuchh Mat Puchho Kaise Bitin" – Lata Mangeshkar, Mukesh
5. "O Kanhayyaa Aaj Aanaa Kvaab Men" – Lata Mangeshkar
6. "Yaad Aayi Aadhi Raat Ko, Kal Raat Ki Tauba" – Mukesh
7. "Saawan Aawan Keh Gaye Dil Mein Sama Ke Milne Na Aaye" – Lata Mangeshkar
8. "Kahaan Hai Kahaan Hai Kanhaiya, Samjhe Na Pyar Mera" – Lata Mangeshkar
