= Bewafa (1952 film) =

1952 film

- Poster
- Directed by: M. L. Anand
- Written by: Sarshar
- Screenplay by: Akhtar Hussain
- Story by: Akhtar Hussain
- Produced by: Jaffer Hussain
- Starring: Ashok Kumar; Raj Kapoor; Nargis
- Edited by: Z. F. Chaus
- Music by: A. R. Qureshi, later also known as Alla Rakha (tabla player)
- Production company: The Art Centre
- Distributed by: The Art Centre
- Release date: 1952
- Country: India
- Language: Hindi

Bewafa (lit. 'Disloyal') is a 1952 Indian film directed by M. L. Anand, starring the hit Bollywood pair Nargis, Raj Kapoor, along with Ashok Kumar as a lead actor and he appears as a painter in the movie.

== Plot ==
It depicts the story of a poor girl, Roopa (Nargis) who is forced by her alcoholic uncle to work. When she cannot meet her uncle's demand to earn money, she is removed from the house by her uncle, when her neighbour Raj (Raj Kapoor) comes to her aid and loans her some money. Despite that, she finds it difficult to make ends meet, and then she meets Ashok (Ashok Kumar), with whom she later sells paintings, however then Raj reenters her life. The story follows the love triangle between Roopa, Raj and Ashok.

== Cast ==
- Ashok Kumar as Ashok
- Raj Kapoor as Raj
- Nargis as Roopa
- Neelam as Neeli
- Bhudo Advani as Advani

== Soundtrack ==
Lyrics written by Sarshar Sailani and Shams Azimabadi (uncredited), music composed by Alla Rakha Qureshi who later became a noted tabla player in India (Alla Rakha).

Song	Singer	Lyrics
"Kaam Haathon Ka Hai Milne Ki Duayen Karna"	Talat Mahmood	Sarshar Sailani
"Tu Aaye Na Aaye Teri Khushi"	Talat Mahmood	Sarshar Sailani
"Tumko Fursat Ho Meri Jaan Toh Idhar Dekh Toh Lo"	Talat Mahmood	Sarshar Sailani
"Dil Matwala Lakh Sambhala, Phir Bhi Kisi Par Aa Hi Gaya" (Male Version)	Talat Mahmood	Sarshar Sailani
"Dil Matwala Lakh Sambhala, Phir Bhi Kisi Par Aa Hi Gaya" (Female version)	Lata Mangeshkar	Sarshar Sailani
"Isi Ka Naam Duniya Hai"	Lata Mangeshkar	Sarshar Sailani
"Badnaseebi Ka Gila Ae Dil-e-Nashad Na Kar"	Lata Mangeshkar	Sarshar Sailani
"O' Tana Derana Na Tana Tana Derana"	Shamshad Begum	Sarshar Sailani
"Aa Jao Mere Dilruba"	Geeta Dutt	Shams Azimabadi (uncredited)
