= Bunny Reuben =

Indian film historian (1926–2007)

- Born: 1926
- Died: 15 February 2007 (aged 80–81); Mumbai, Maharashtra, India
- Occupations: Historian, journalist, publicist
- Years active: 1940s–2007
- Children: 3

Bunny Reuben (1926 – 15 February 2007) was an Indian film historian, journalist, and publicist. He wrote several books, both fiction and non-fiction. He started his career as a film-focusing journalist in the 1940s, and worked for several publications, including Filmfare. According to Randhir Kapoor, a son of the actor Raj Kapoor, whose biography Reuben wrote, "It is a great loss to the RK family and the film industry. He was not only a good journalist and publicist, he was a great film historian." Navras Jaat Aafreedi of the Presidency University, Kolkata described Reuben in 2016 as one of the most prominent Bene Israel figures of India.

== Bibliography ==
- Reuben, Bunny (1969). Monkeys on the Hill of God: Eight Angry Stories of India. Pearl Publications. OCLC 3554943.
- Reuben, Bunny (1973). You, I, and Her: A Novel. Vikas Publications. OCLC 2507046.
- Reuben, Bunny (1979). The Shalimar Adventure. Vikas Publications. OCLC 8285878.
- Reuben, Bunny (1988). Raj Kapoor: The Fabulous Showman. National Film Development Corporation of India. ISBN 978-81-85304-03-8.
- Reuben, Bunny (1993). Follywood Flashback: A Collection of Movie Memories. Indus. ISBN 978-81-72231-06-4.
- Reuben, Bunny (1994). Mehboob: ...India's DeMille. Indus. OCLC 59650553.
- Reuben, Bunny (2000). Savage Trio: Three Stories. Unknown. OCLC 53997546.
- Reuben, Bunny (2004). Dilip Kumar: Star Legend of Indian Cinema. HarperCollins. ISBN 978-81-72235-68-0.
- Reuben, Bunny (2005). ...and Pran: A Biography. HarperCollins and Living Media. ISBN 978-81-72234-66-9.
- Reuben, Bunny (2005). Contributions of the Jews to the Indian Film Industry. Unknown. OCLC 58840498.
