= Dhanwan (1937 film) =

- Directed by: Premankur Atorthy
- Produced by: Imperial Film Company
- Starring: Rattan Bai; W. M. Khan; Hafisji; Jamshedji
- Music by: H. C. Bali
- Production company: Imperial Film Company
- Release date: 1937
- Running time: 130 min
- Country: India
- Language: Hindi

Dhanwan (Wealthy) also called Mazdoor Ki Beti is a 1937 Hindi social film. It was directed by Premankur Atorthy for Imperial Film Company. The film starred Rattan Bai, Hafisji, W. M. Khan, and Jamshedji. The music was composed by H. C. Bali. The film was loosely based on the story idea from Victor Hugo's 1831 novel The Hunchback of Notre-Dame.

== Cast ==
- Rattan Bai
- Hafisji
- W. M. Khan
- Jamshedji

== Songs ==
- "Ghar Se Bhoola Bhatka Musafir"
- "Hamari Kaha Maano Babuji"
- "Mohe Garwa Gaana Pada Babu"
- "Gurbat Mein Zindagi Ka Koi Aasra Nahin"
- "Raat Sooni Sajarya Pe Ho Devra"
- "Jis Zaalim Se Yeh Aankh Ladi"
- "Tere Pyaar Ne Loota Man Pyaare"
- "Teri Bhakti Mein Bhagwan"
