= Dhoon =

- Directed by: M. Kumar
- Produced by: Silver Films
- Starring: Raj Kapoor; Nargis
- Music by: Madan Mohan
- Release date: 31 July 1953
- Country: India
- Language: Hindi

Dhoon (Tune or Passion) is a 1953 Bollywood film directed by M. Kumar. The film was produced by Silver Kings, a production company formed by Kumar and his then wife, actress Pramila. The film stars Raj Kapoor, Nargis, Motilal, Kumar, Pramila, E. Bilmoria, Leela Mishra and Kamal Mehra. Mehra was a lesser known comedian who started his career in 1951 with Naujawan. He went on to act in several films before starting his own production company Pride of India under which he made films like Kismat (1968), Mahal (1969) and Naami Chor (1977). The music was composed by Madan Mohan.

== Cast ==
- Raj Kapoor as Raj
- Nargis as Kamini
- Motilal

== Soundtrack ==
The music director was Madan Mohan. The film had three lyricists, Kaif Irfani, Pyarelal Santoshi and Bharat Vyas. The playback singing was by Lata Mangeshkar, Mohammed Rafi, Hemant Kumar, Rajkumari and Zohrabai Ambalewali.

=== Songlist ===
Song	Singer
"Sitaron Se Poochho"	Lata Mangeshkar
"Badi Barbadiyan Lekar"	Lata Mangeshkar
"Nindiya Na Aaye Tum Bin"	Lata Mangeshkar
"Tare Gin Gin Biti Sari Raat"	Lata Mangeshkar
"Ham Pyar Karenge, Hum Pyar Karenge"	Lata Mangeshkar, Hemant Kumar
"Koi Ek Aana, Koi Do Aana"	Mohammed Rafi
"Nazar Mila Le O Dilruba"	Mohammed Rafi
"Gori Ki Ankhiyan"	Mohammed Rafi
"Banne, Teri Umeed Humne Lakhon Moti Boye"	Zohrabai Ambalewali, Rajkumari
