= Boot Polish (film) =

1954 film

- Film poster
- Directed by: Prakash Arora
- Written by: Bhanupratap
- Produced by: Raj Kapoor
- Starring: Ratan Kumar; Naaz; David
- Cinematography: Tara Dutt
- Edited by: G. G. Mayekar
- Music by: Shankar-Jaikishan
- Production company: R. K. Films
- Distributed by: R. K. Films
- Release date: 12 February 1954
- Country: India
- Language: Hindi

Boot Polish

Boot Polish is a 1954 Indian Hindi-language comedy drama directed by Prakash Arora and produced by Raj Kapoor (who also ghost directed the film). It won Best Film at the Filmfare Awards. The film has starcast Ratan Kumar, Naaz, David in the lead roles.

== Plot ==
Bhola and Belu are left in the care of their wicked aunt Kamla, a prostitute, after their mother dies. She forces them to beg on the streets and takes the whole collection at night, often by beating them brutally.

A bootlegger and neighbour of Kamla, named John teaches them self-respect and to work for a living instead of begging. Both kids start saving from their begging money by giving less to Kamla, so they can buy a shoe-polish kit and begin shining shoes. The duo manage to buy a shoe-polish kit and starts the business. But when Kamla discovers this, she beats them and kicks them out of the house.

Meanwhile, John discovers that Belu wants a new frock and Bhola needs a new shirt as their current rags are torn and worn out. Overwhelmed by the emotions to help Belu and Bhola, John decides to sell unauthorized liquor and gets arrested. The children, on the other hand, are left to fend for themselves. When it rains, and people stop having their shoes polished, the children are in danger of starving. Bhola wishes never to beg again and rejects a coin tossed to him on a rainy night. When Belu takes it out of hunger, Bhola slaps her, and she drops it.

When the police come, intent on taking the children, Belu escapes onto a train, but Bhola is arrested. On board the train, Belu is adopted by a wealthy family, and she is sad for her brother.

Bhola searches for Belu after being released but cannot find her. After running away from an orphanage, he is unable to find work and resorts to begging in extreme hunger. He encounters Belu while begging at the railway station where Belu and her adopted family are boarding a train for vacation. Humiliated, Bhola runs away, but his sister pursues him. John has also come to the station to say goodbye and joins the chase, but he falls and is injured. Bhola stops running, and Belu and Bhola are reunited.

The wealthy family adopts Bhola also, and they live happily ever after.

== Cast ==
- Ratan Kumar as Bhola
- Naaz as Belu
- David as John
- Chand Burke as Kamla
- Bhudo Advani as Pedro
- Raj Kapoor as himself
- Larycist Shailendra singing "chali kaunse desh" song as Blind singer

== Production ==
In a piece for the Indian Express on 2 April 1954 issue titled 'Why I Produced Boot Polish', Raj Kapoor wrote, "In Awaara I tried to prove that Vagabonds are not born, but are created in the slums of our modern cities, in the midst of dire poverty and evil environment. Boot Polish graphically shows the problem of destitute children, their struggle for existence and their fight against organised beggary. The purpose of this film is to bring home to you that these orphans are as much your responsibility as that of the Government. Individual charity will not solve this problem because the only solution is co-operative effort on a National scale."

== Awards ==
Film poster with photograph

1955 Cannes Film Festival

- Special Mention to a child actress - Naaz

Filmfare Awards

- Best Cinematographer - Tara Dutt
- Best Film - Raj Kapoor
- Best Supporting Actor - David

== Soundtrack ==
Lyrics were written by Hasrat Jaipuri, Shailendra and Deepak. Music for the songs were composed by Shankar–Jaikishan.

Song	Singer
"Main Baharon Ki Natkhat Rani"	Asha Bhosle
"Nanhe Munne Bachche Teri Mutthi Mein Kya Hai"	Asha Bhosle, Mohammed Rafi
"Tumhare Hain, Tumse Daya Mangte Hain"	Asha Bhosle, Mohammed Rafi
"Chali Kaunse Desh Gujariya Tu Saj Dhajke"	Asha Bhosle, Talat Mahmood
"Thehar Zara O Janewale, Babu Mister Gore Kale, Kab Se Baithe Aas Lagaye Hum Matwale"	Asha Bhosle, Manna Dey, Madhubala Jhaveri
"Raat Gayi, Phir Din Aata Hai, Isi Tarah Aate Jate Hi"	Asha Bhosle, Manna Dey
"Lapak Jhapak Tu Aa Re Badarwa"	Manna Dey
