= Phir Subha Hogi =

- Directed by: Ramesh Saigal
- Written by: D. N. Madhok
- Story by: Ramesh Saigal; Mubarak
- Produced by: Ramesh Saigal
- Starring: Raj Kapoor; Mala Sinha; Rehman
- Cinematography: Krishan Saigal
- Edited by: Niranjan R. Chawhan (Supervisor); S. R. Kabre
- Music by: Khayyam
- Distributed by: Parijat Pictures
- Release date: 1958
- Running time: 168 minutes
- Country: India
- Language: Hindi
- Box office: ₹18,000,000

Phir Subha Hogi (transl. morning will dawn again) is a 1958 Indian Hindi-language drama film produced and directed by Ramesh Saigal. It stars Raj Kapoor, Mala Sinha, Rehman in the lead roles. The film is an adaptation of Fyodor Dostoevsky's novel Crime and Punishment.

It was the fourth highest-grossing film in India in 1958 and was declared a "hit" at the box office in India.

== Plot ==
Ram (Raj Kapoor) is a poor law student who supports his education with money orders from his mother and things he pawns. While struggling with his poor finances, he saves a boy from an accident. Seeing the poor condition of the boy's family, he gives all his savings for the boy's treatment. Ram keeps visiting the boy and falls in love with the boy's elder sister Soni (Mala Sinha). Soni's father Gopal (Nana Palsikar) is an alcoholic, which Harbanslal (Jagdish Sethi) keeps providing him with. Harbanslal has a mean motive in doing so, as he wants to marry Soni. To prevent Soni's arranged marriage with Harbanslal, Ram decides to rob the pawn broker, but he is caught in the act and he murders the pawn owner.

Ram's conscience keeps telling him to admit to his crime, but he never picks up the courage to do so. The police inspector on the case keeps suspecting Ram for the crime. With no proof he, too, is helpless. Ram learns that the police have already arrested another thief and have charged him with this robbery and murder. On the last day, when the court is to rule in the case, Ram makes up his mind and admits. He pleads saying how he was acting in self-defense against real villains of the society. The court sentences him to three years of imprisonment. Soni promises that she will wait for his release and then marry him.

== Cast ==
- Raj Kapoor as Ram
- Mala Sinha as Soni
- Rehman as Rehman
- Mubarak as Police Inspector
- Jagdish Sethi as Harbanslal
- Nana Palsikar as Gopal
- Leela Chitnis as Soni's Mother
- Tun Tun as Ram's Landlord
- Kamal Kapoor as Soni's Molester

== Music ==
Lyrics for this socially relevant film were composed by Sahir Ludhianvi and music by Khayyam. The song "Chin-O-Arab Hamara, Hindustan Hamara, Rehne Ko Ghar Nahin Hain, Sara Jahan Hamara" sung by Mukesh and picturised on Raj Kapoor, became very popular yet controversial, and was very close to being banned then.

Song	Singer	Raga
"Do Boonden Sawan Ki"	Asha Bhosle	
"Phir Na Kijiye Meri Gustakh Nigahon Ka Gila"	Asha Bhosle, Mukesh	Kalyan
"Woh Subah Kabhi To Aayegi"	Asha Bhosle, Mukesh	
"Jis Pyar Mein Yeh Haal Ho, Us Pyar Se Tauba"	Mohammed Rafi, Mukesh	
"Saara Jahan Hamara"	Mukesh	
"Aasman Pe Hai Khuda"	Mukesh	

== Reception ==
Phir Subha Hogi fared successfully at the box office and was the fourth highest-grossing film of the year 1958 behind Madhumati, Chalti Ka Naam Gaadi and Yahudi. The music composed by Khayyam is considered as "rich and beautiful". Songs like "Chin-O-Arab Hamara" and "Woh Subah Kabhi To Aayegi" penned by Sahir Ludhianvi were satirical on the condition of India and the Nehruvian politics. "Chin-o-Arab Hamara" was a parody on Iqbal's poem "Tarana-e-Milli".
