= Parivartan (film) =

- Poster
- Directed by: N. R. Acharya
- Starring: Raj Kapoor
- Release date: 1949
- Country: India
- Language: Hindi

Parivartan (transl. Change) is a 1949 Indian Hindi-language film directed by N. R. Acharya, starring Raj Kapoor. It was remade in Hindi under the title Jagriti.

== Cast ==
- Raj Kapoor
- Nargis

== Music ==
Song	Singer(s)
"Ae Duniya Ham Par Rahem Karna Sata Le Jitna Sataya"	Mohammed Rafi
"Duniya Badal Gayi Hamare Dil Badal Gaye"	N/A
"Hasrat Liye Hue Hai Tamanna Liye Hue Hai"	Mohammed Rafi
