= Jail Yatra (1947 film) =

- Directed by: Gajanan Jagirdar
- Produced by: Jagirdar Productions
- Starring: Raj Kapoor; Kamini Kaushal
- Music by: Ninu Majumdar
- Release date: 1947
- Country: India
- Language: Hindi

Jail Yatra is an Indian Hindi-language drama film released in 1947. It was directed by Gajanan Jagirdar.

== Cast ==
- Raj Kapoor
- Kamini Kaushal
- Ramlal
- Badri Prasad
- Bikram Kapoor

== Music ==
1. "Duniya Sari Jail Re" – Ninu Majumdar
2. "Piya Milne Naveli" – Raj Kapoor
3. "O Gori Kahan 7hali" – Meena Kapoor, Ninu Majumdar
