= Raj Kapoor =

Indian actor and filmmaker (1924–1988)

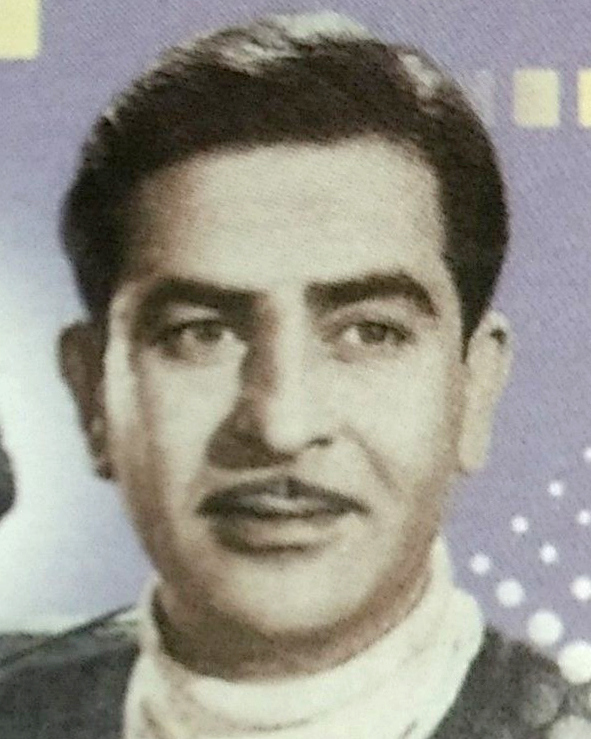
- Born: Shrishti Nath Kapoor; 14 December 1924; Peshawar, British India
- Died: 2 June 1988 (aged 63); New Delhi, India
- Other names: Showman of Bollywood; Charlie Chaplin of India
- Education: Campion School
- Occupations: Actor; director; producer; editor
- Years active: 1935–1988
- Organization: R. K. Films
- Works: Full list
- Spouse: Krishna Malhotra (m. 1946)
- Partner: Nargis (1947–1956)
- Children: 5, including Randhir, Rishi, and Rajiv
- Parents: Prithviraj Kapoor (father); Ramsarni Mehra Kapoor (mother)
- Family: Kapoor family
- Awards: Full list
- Honours: Padma Bhushan (1971); Dadasaheb Phalke Award (1988)

Ranbir Raj Kapoor (pronounced [raːdʒ kəˈpuːɾ]; born Shrishti Nath Kapoor; 14 December 1924 – 2 June 1988), popularly known as Raj Kapoor was an Indian actor and filmmaker who worked in Hindi cinema. He is considered to be one of the greatest and most influential actors and filmmakers in the history of Indian cinema. He has been referred to as The Greatest Showman of Indian Cinema as well as The Charlie Chaplin of Indian Cinema.

Born in Peshawar as the eldest son of Prithviraj Kapoor of the Kapoor family, Raj Kapoor starred in and produced many films for which he received multiple accolades, including three National Film Awards and 11 Filmfare Awards in India. He was inspired by Charlie Chaplin and played characters based on The Tramp in films, such as Awāra (1951), Shree 420 (1955) and Mera Naam Joker (1970). His performance in Awāra was ranked as one of the "Top-Ten Greatest Performances of All Time in World Cinema" by Time magazine in 2005. His films Awāra (1951) and Boot Polish (1954) competed for the Palme d'Or prize at the Cannes Film Festival in 1951 and 1955.

His films were global commercial successes in parts of Asia, the Middle East, the Caribbean, Africa, and the Soviet bloc. The Government of India honoured him with the Padma Bhushan in 1971 for his contributions to the arts. India's highest award in cinema, the Dadasaheb Phalke Award, was bestowed to him in 1988 by the Government of India. In 2000, he was named by India Today as one of the 100 people who shaped India in the 20th century.

== Early life and background ==
Raj Kapoor was born as Shrishti Nath Kapoor on 14 December 1924 at Kapoor Haveli, a large house then owned by his grandfather in the Qissa Khwani Bazaar neighborhood of Peshawar, in the North-West Frontier Province of British India, into a Punjabi Hindu Khatri family. He had an Arya Samaji upbringing. His parents were Prithviraj Kapoor (3 November 1906 – 29 May 1972) and Ramsarni Devi Kapoor (née Mehra) (25 December 1908 – 14 June 1972). As per what Raj Kapoor's son Rishi Kapoor stated in his autobiography Khullam Khulla: Rishi Kapoor Uncensored, "It was he (Prithviraj Kapoor) who changed the family name from Nath to Raj, so that Prithvi Nath Kapoor became Prithviraj Kapoor. My father was named Shrishti Nath Kapoor at birth, but this was changed to Ranbir Raj Kapoor, which in turn became Raj Kapoor." Based on his father's name, Rishi Kapoor's son was named Ranbir Kapoor. The Kapoor family hailed originally from Samundri, a town in the Lyallpur District of the Punjab Province of British India (now in the Faisalabad District of Punjab, Pakistan).

Raj Kapoor was the eldest of six children in the family. He was the grandson of Dewan Basheshwarnath Kapoor, great-grandson of Dewan Keshavmal Kapoor, and great-great-grandson of Dewan Murli Mal Kapoor, and was part of the Kapoor family. His brothers were the late actors Shammi Kapoor (21 October 1931 – 14 August 2011) and Shashi Kapoor (18 March 1938 – 4 December 2017). He also had a sister named Urmila Sial (30 December 1933 – 25 July 2001). Two other siblings between Raj and Shammi, namely Devinder (Devi) and Ravinder (Nandi) died in infancy, within a gap of two weeks, both in the year 1931. Devi died of double pneumonia while Nandi died after accidentally swallowing rat poison while playing in the garden. Kapoor's family later on moved from Peshawar to Bombay for residence and for education. As Prithviraj moved from city to city early in his career during the 1930s, the family had to move too. Raj Kapoor attended several different schools like Colonel Brown Cambridge School in Dera Doon, St Xavier's Collegiate School in Calcutta and Campion School in Bombay.

=== Extended family ===
He is the nephew of actor Trilok Kapoor, who is the younger brother of his father. His first cousin was director Vijay Kapoor who was the son of Trilok Kapoor and actor Subbiraj who was his father's sister's son. His father's cousin was film producer Surinder Kapoor, whose children are producer Boney Kapoor and actors Anil Kapoor and Sanjay Kapoor. His father's maternal first cousins were actors Kamal Kapoor, Ravindra Kapoor, and Nandkishore Kapoor. Kamal's grandson is filmmaker Goldie Behl. His maternal first cousin, Juggal Kishore Mehra, was a singer, whose step-granddaughter, Salma Agha, later became an actress and singer.

== Career ==
=== Debut and struggle (1947–1948) ===
At the age of ten, Raj Kapoor appeared in a Hindi film for the first time, in the 1935 film Inquilab.

Some early success came with the lead role in 1947 with Kidar Sharma's romantic drama Neel Kamal opposite Begum Para and Madhubala. The film wasn't a success, much like his other releases the same year viz. Dil Ki Rani, Chittor Vijay again both opposite Madhubala alongside Jail Yatra opposite Kamini Kaushal. In 1948, he founded his own banner R. K. Films and made his directional debut with the musical drama Aag in which he starred alongside Nargis, Premnath, Kamini Kaushal and Nigar Sultana. The film was an average grosser, but received positive reviews from critics. Aag also marked the first time Kapoor and Nargis were seen together as an on-screen romantic pair.

=== Superstardom and international success (1949–1964) ===
Several films released in 1949 had a major influence on Kapoor's career. His first release Sunehre Din flopped commercially, but his next release, Parivartan, emerged as a commercially successful venture. His third release of the year, Mehboob Khan's romantic drama Andaz, which also starred Dilip Kumar and Nargis, went on to become highly successful at the box office. This was followed by Barsaat, which he also directed and produced. The film went ahead of the former, eventually emerging as the highest grossing Indian film of all time, breaking the record of Kismet. It ran in Kolkata's Paradise Cinema for almost two years. The huge box office success of Andaz and Barsaat made Kapoor one of the leading male stars of the time along with Dilip Kumar and Dev Anand.

The following year, he starred in Sargam and Dastan opposite Rehana and Suraiya, respectively. Kapoor also acted in the 1950 film Pyar, which was not a hit movie and not a popular movie, and did not receive critical acclaim. In that film, the singers were Kishore Kumar, Geeta Dutt, and Shamshad Begum. The film had a total of nine songs, with Kishore Kumar singing five songs which were two solos and three duets. The three duets Kishore had was two duets with Geeta Dutt and one duet with Shmashad Begum. Geeta Dutt singing six songs, which were two duets with Kishore Kumar and four solos, and Shamshad Begum singing only one song which was only one duet with Kishore Kumar. This movie marked the first, and last time Kishore Kumar sang for Raj Kapoor, and it was rare for only one male singer to sing in one film as in most of his films, more than one playback singer sings for him in his films, and Raj Kapoor's major playback singers for him were Mukesh and Manna Dey. He also acted with his 'discovery' Nimmi, this time opposite him, for the first and last time, in Banwra. He also reunited with Nargis in Jan Pahchan. Both these films went unsuccessful but Bawre Nain, where he was cast opposite his future sister-in-law Geeta Bali, for the first and last time, emerged as one of the highest grossers of 1950.

Kapoor had only one release in 1951 which was his own directional, the crime drama Awāra co-starring Prithviraj Kapoor and Nargis. The film opened to highly positive response from critics as well as the audience and proved to be another major success for the actor. Its soundtrack composed by Shankar–Jaikishan was the best-selling Hindi film music album of the 1950s and became popular in foreign markets as well, especially in the Soviet Union, China, Turkey and Afghanistan. Awāra also earned Kapoor a fan-following in Soviet Union where the film had approximately 100 million admissions and remains the third-most watched foreign film in the country. In 1952, he reunited with Nargis for psychological drama Anhonee and crime noir Bewafa which also starred Ashok Kumar, in which he played a full-fledged negative character (title role) for the only time in his career. While Anhonee was a success, Bewafa only managed average returns. His other films with Nargis in 1952, Amber and Ashiana too failed to attain commercial success. This was followed by a minor setback, the next year as none of his films, including Aah, Dhoon and Papi, all opposite Nargis, worked at the box office. Papi remains the lone film in Kapoor's career when he played double role.

After having made a cameo in the critically acclaimed and commercially successful Boot Polish in 1954, he made a comeback in 1955 with the comedy drama film Shree 420, co-starring Nargis and Nadira, which garnered critical acclaim and emerged as the highest-grossing Hindi film of the year. Its songs, such as "Mera Joota Hai Japani", a solo by Mukesh, "Pyar Hua Iqrar Hua", a duet by Manna Dey and Lata Mangeshkar, and "Mud Mud Ke Na Dekh", a duet by Dey and Asha Bhosle, topped the year-end annual list of Binaca Geetmala and made its soundtrack the fourth best-selling Bollywood album of the 1950s. Shree 420 was released in the Soviet Union in 1956 and it took 2nd spot at the Soviet box office charts that year. Despite being imported at an unusually high price, it was the most successful foreign film of the year at the Soviet box office, drawing an audience of 35 million viewers. At the 3rd National Awards, it won National Award for Second Best Feature Film in Hindi. The following year, he starred in Anant Thakur's Chori Chori and Sombhu Mitra's Jagte Raho (which he also produced). Although underperforming commercially, the latter received acclaim and its Bengali version won Certificate of Merit at the 4th National Film Awards. Chori Chori and Jagte Raho also proved to be the final film appearances of Nargis opposite Kapoor. Chori Chori also saw Kapoor collaborating and sharing screen with Johnny Walker for the only time in their careers.

After delivering a moderate fare with Sharada in 1957, Kapoor delivered two successful films, the next year - Phir Subha Hogi and Parvarish, both co-starring Mala Sinha. In 1959, he collaborated with Hrishikesh Mukherjee for the comedy drama film Anari, which also had Nutan, Motilal and Lalita Pawar in the lead. The film took number one spot at the box office that year and was a blockbuster for Mukherjee whose last directional Musafir received lukewarm response from audience. The soundtrack of Anari became one of the best-selling Hindi film album of the decade. Especially the song "Kisi Ki Muskurahaton Pe", a solo by Mukesh, was very popular. For his performance in the film, Kapoor won his first Filmfare Award for Best Actor. He also appeared in Kanhaiya, again opposite Nutan besides appearing in Main Nashe Mein Hoon opposite Mala Sinha, Do Ustad opposite Madhubala, Char Dil Char Rahen opposite Meena Kumari and which also starred his brother Shammi Kapoor; none of these films were successful.

Kapoor began the 1960s with Radhu Karmakar's Jis Desh Mein Ganga Behti Hai (which he also produced), Manmohan Desai's Chhalia and S. M. Abbas' Shriman Satyawadi. Jis Desh Mein Ganga Behti Hai did very well at the box office. It won Kapoor several accolades, including National Award for Second Best Feature Film in Hindi, Filmfare Award for Best Film and his second Filmfare Award for Best Actor. Chhalia based on Fyodor Dostoevsky's "White Nights" was a moderate commercial success, but received positive response from critics. Lastly, Shriman Satyawadi, which marked the directorial debut of S. M. Abbas, also marked the only film to star Kapoor opposite Shakila, attained moderate success at the box office. From 1961 to 1963, he had only one success in C. V. Sridhar's melodrama film Nazrana (1961). In 1964, Kapoor had two releases, Dulha Dulhan opposite Sadhana and his own directional Sangam, co-starring Vyjayanthimala and Rajendra Kumar, which was the first Indian film to be exclusively shot abroad on locations including London, Paris and Switzerland and was also among the most expensive film of its time with the longest runtime for an Indian film up to that time. Sangam, which was Kapoor's first color film, was the second-highest-grossing film of the 1960s behind Mughal-E-Azam. Its soundtrack, composed by Shankar-Jaikishan, became very popular and included the songs "Dost Dost Na Raha", "Har Dil Jo Pyaar Karega", "Bol Radha Bol", "Yeh Mera Prem Patra". Sangam also proved to be one of the last major hits of Kapoor as a lead.

=== Decline, focus on direction and further acting assignments (1965–1988) ===
Kapoor lost stardom in the late-1960s as his subsequent releases, such as Teesri Kasam (1966), Diwana (1967), Around the World (1967) and Sapnon Ka Saudagar (1968) were commercially unsuccessful. In 1970, he starred, produced and directed Mera Naam Joker, which took six years in making. The film had an ensemble cast consisting of Simi Garewal, Kseniya Ryabinkina, Padmini, Manoj Kumar, Dharmendra, Rajendra Kumar and Rishi Kapoor (playing younger version of Kapoor). Upon release, Mera Naam Joker was heavily panned by critics and proved to be a box office bomb, eventually putting Kapoor into a financial crisis. However, in later years, it attained cult status and is now considered one of his best films with film experts labelling it a "misunderstood masterpiece". For portraying a kind-hearted clown in the film, Kapoor won BFJA Award for Best Actor (Hindi).

The following year, Kapoor produced and appeared alongside his son (Randhir Kapoor) and father in Kal Aaj Aur Kal. The film proved to be moderately successful and marked Shankar-Jaikishan's last collaboration with R. K. Films. In 1973, he decided to launch Rishi to cover-up the losses incurred due to the box office failure of Mera Naam Joker, in the romantic musical Bobby, which paired him opposite debutante Dimple Kapadia. The film opened to thunderous commercial response, both in India as well as overseas, and emerged as the highest-grossing film of 1973, as well as one of the highest grossing to that point. In 1975, Kapoor returned to acting with two back-to-back successful films in Randhir Kapoor's Dharam Karam and Naresh Kumar's Do Jasoos. In 1978, he returned to the director's chair with Satyam Shivam Sundaram starring Shashi Kapoor and Zeenat Aman. It ran into controversies and was accused of promoting "obscenity", but opened to a positive reception from the critics as well as the audience and earned him a nomination in the Filmfare Award for Best Director category.

In 1980, Kapoor appeared alongside Sanjay Khan and Zeenat Aman in the highly anticipated romantic drama Abdullah. Upon release, it did not live up to expectations and underperformed domestically, but was successful overseas due to his popularity in the Soviet Union. In 1982, Kapoor once again directed his son Rishi in the romantic musical drama Prem Rog opposite Padmini Kolhapure. The film marked his return to social themes and emerged commercially successful at the box office as the second-highest-grossing film of the year. Its soundtrack composed by Laxmikant-Pyarelal was also very successful and proved to be one of the best-selling Hindi film albums of the decade. The same year, he appeared alongside Shashi in Asit Sen's Vakil Babu, which marked his final film appearance.

In 1985, he directed and produced the romance film Ram Teri Ganga Maili, which had his youngest son Rajiv Kapoor and the then newcomer Mandakini playing the lead roles. Despite not having any stars, the film took first spot at the box office that year and proved to be one of the biggest hits of the 1980s. At the 33rd Filmfare Awards, it won five awards, including the Best Film, Best Director for Kapoor and Best Music Director for Ravindra Jain. The film was Kapoor's last before his death in 1988. A few months before his death, he had made a film with legendary actor Ashok Kumar, Chor Mandali (1986), but it was never released due to legal issues. Although the movie remains unreleased, its songs are available. He was also working on an Indo-Pak cross-border love story Henna, which was later directed and released by his son Randhir in 1991 and went on to become a major box office success.

== Personal life ==
On 12 May 1946, Raj Kapoor married Krishna Malhotra (30 December 1930 – 1 October 2018), a first cousin of his father Prithviraj. She was then 15 and he was 21. Krishna was one of nine siblings, and following her marriage, many of them joined the Hindi film industry. Her brothers, Rajendra Nath, Prem Nath and Narendra Nath, later became actors, and her sister Uma is married to actor Prem Chopra.

Raj and Krishna Kapoor had five children: three sons, actors Randhir Kapoor (born 15 February 1947), Rishi Kapoor (4 September 1952 – 30 April 2020) and Rajiv Kapoor (25 August 1962 – 9 February 2021),and two daughters, Ritu Nanda (née Kapoor) (30 October 1948 – 14 January 2020) and Reema Jain (née Kapoor). Randhir is married to former actress Babita and is the father of actresses Karisma Kapoor and Kareena Kapoor. Rishi's widow is actress Neetu Singh and their son is actor Ranbir Kapoor. Kapoor's elder daughter, Ritu Nanda, was married to industrialist Rajan Nanda and their son is Nikhil Nanda, married to Shweta, daughter of actors Amitabh Bachchan and Jaya Bachchan.

His grandson Nikhil's son, Agastya Nanda, made his acting debut with The Archies in 2023.

Kapoor had a longtime romantic relationship with actress Nargis Dutt during the 1940s and 1950s, despite being a married man, although neither ever publicly admitted to this. The couple starred in several films together, including Awaara and Shree 420. As Kapoor would not leave his wife and children, Nargis ended their relationship after Chori Chori and married her co-star Sunil Dutt with whom she fell in love on the set of Mother India (1957). In 2017, his second son Rishi confirmed his father's affairs in his autobiography Khullam Khulla.

Krishna Raj Kapoor died on 1 October 2018. Rajan Nanda, husband of Ritu Nanda, died on 5 August 2018. In January 2020, Ritu Nanda herself died. She was followed three months later by her younger brother Rishi, Kapoor's second son, who died in April 2020. Kapoor's third and youngest son, Rajiv, died in February 2021.

== Death ==
=== Cause ===
Raj Kapoor suffered from asthma in his later years; he died of complications related to the disease in 1988 at the age of 63. He collapsed at the event where he was to receive the Dadasaheb Phalke Award in New Delhi, and was taken to the All India Institute of Medical Sciences, New Delhi for treatment. He was hospitalised for about a month before he succumbed to complications arising from his asthma. At the time of his death, he was working on the movie Henna (an Indo-Pakistan based love story). The film was later completed by his sons Randhir Kapoor and Rishi Kapoor and was released in 1991.

=== Memorial at family farm in Pune ===
His and his parents' samadhi is at their family farm "Rajbaugh", meaning the "gardens of king". Located inside the MIT Art Design and Technology University (MIT ADTU), Rajbaugh lies on the banks of Mula-Mutha River in Loni Kalbhor village 30 km east of Pune in Maharashtra. The Kapoor family sold part of the 125-acre Rajbaugh to MIT ADTU which built a memorial for the family on its campus. The memorial was unveiled in 2014 in the presence of Lata Mangeshkar and the Kapoor clan. The Kapoor family memorial has 7 pagodas showing elements of Raj Kapoor's movies, a museum or viewing gallery which showcases family photographs and moments from his movie making from 1945 to 1990. Raj Kapoor shot many of his films at this farm, including Satyam Shivam Sundaram, Mera Naam Joker, Bobby, and Prem Rog. The family bungalow inside the farm has been preserved; the popular song "Hum Tum Ek Kamre Mein Band Ho" was shot inside this bungalow.

== Artistry and legacy ==
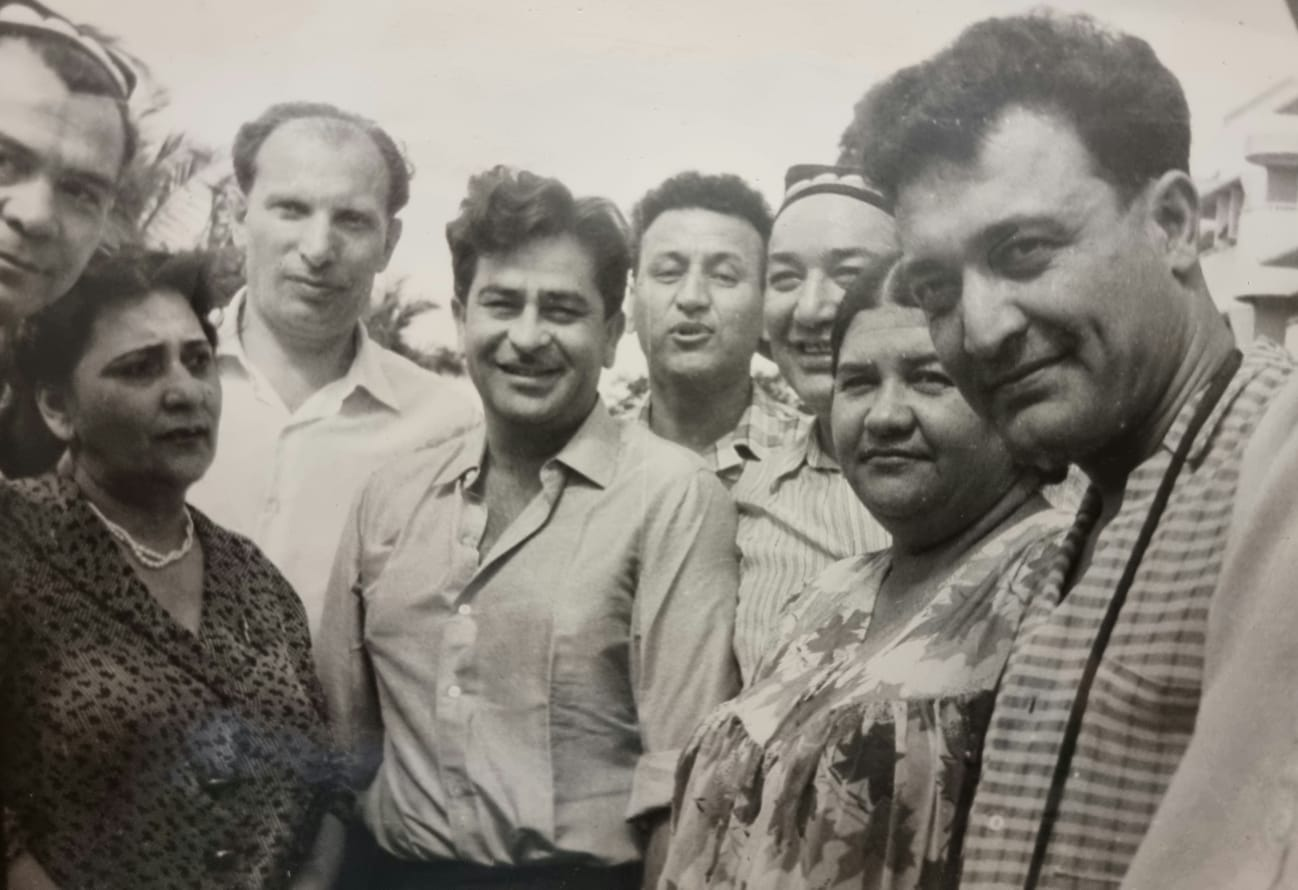
Raj Kapoor alongside a delegation of writers from Soviet Uzbekistan (Sami Abduqahhor etc.), 1950s, India

Raj Kapoor is often referred as The Greatest Showman of Indian Cinema in the Indian media. Film historians and movie buffs speak of him as the "Charlie Chaplin of Indian cinema", since he often portrayed a tramp-like figure, who, despite adversity, was still cheerful and honest. His movies were popular in large parts of South/Central/Southeast Asia, the former Soviet Union/Bloc, China, the Middle East, and Africa; his movies were global commercial successes.

Siddharth Kak made Raj Kapoor, a feature film documentary on the actor in 1987 which was produced by the Government of India's Films Division.

A postage stamp, bearing his face, was released by India Post to honour him on 14 December 2001. To honour him, a brass statue of his was unveiled at Walk of the Stars at Bandra Bandstand in Mumbai in March 2012.

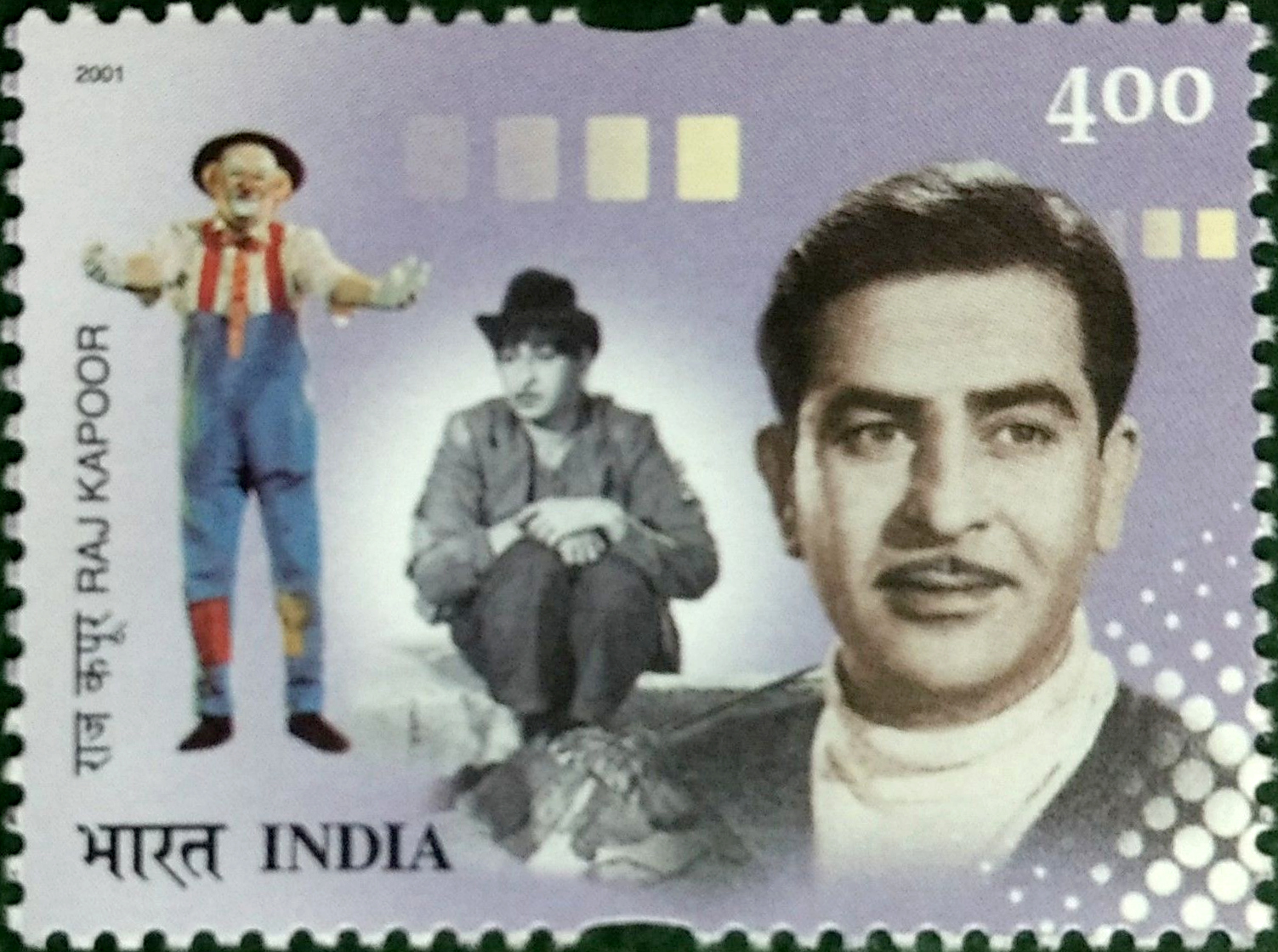
Raj Kapoor 2001 stamp of India

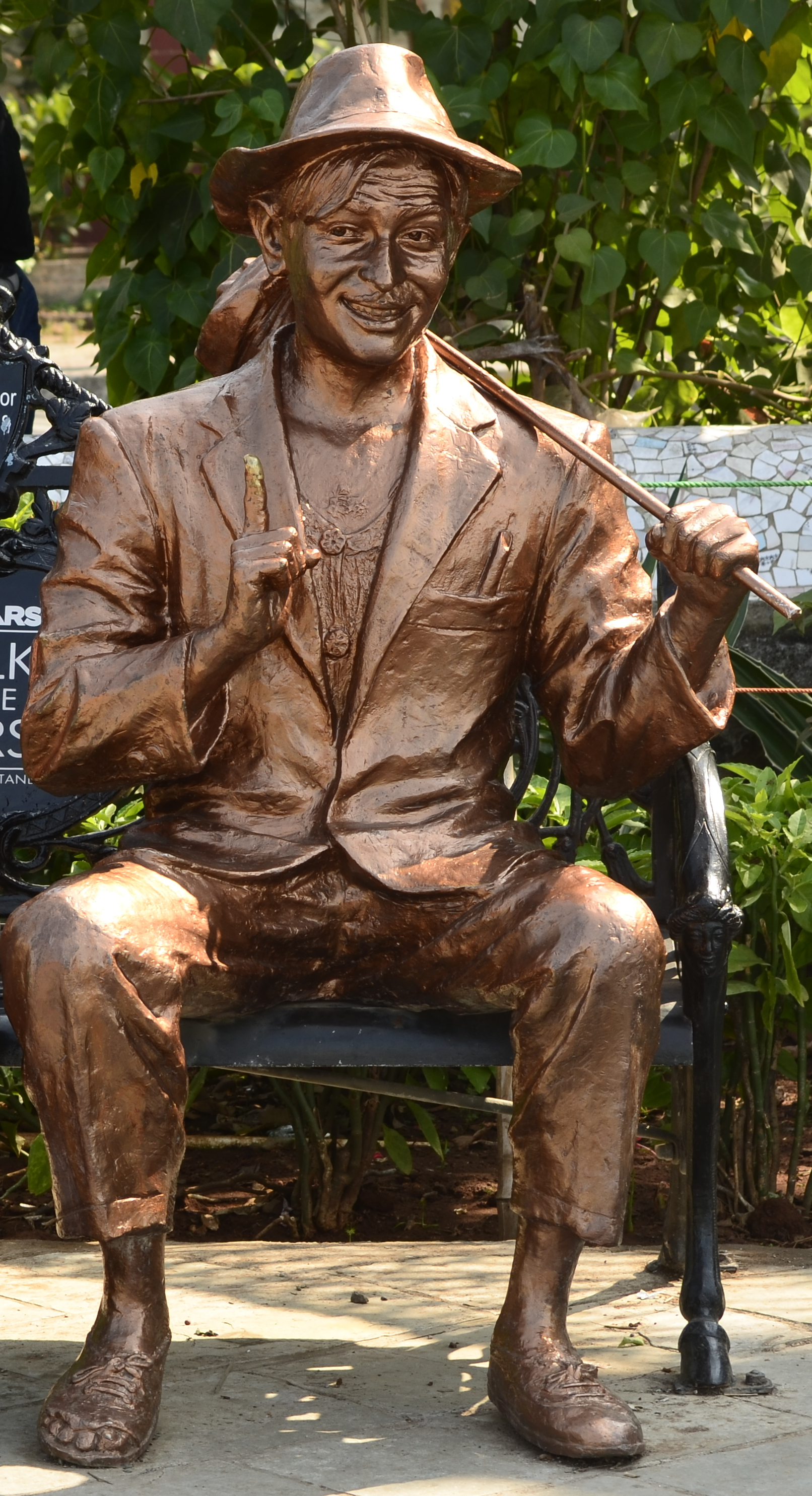
Kapoor's statue at Walk of the Stars

Many of Raj Kapoor's movies had a patriotic theme. His films Aag, Shree 420 and Jis Desh Men Ganga Behti Hai (In the country where the Ganges flows) celebrated the newly independent India, and encouraged film-goers to be patriots. Raj Kapoor commissioned these famous lyrics for "Mera Joota Hai Japani", a song from the movie Shree 420:

Mera joota hai Japani (My shoes are Japanese)
Ye patloon Inglistani (These trousers are English)
Sar pe lal topi Roosi (The red cap on my head is Russian)
Phir bhi dil hai Hindustani (But still, however, my heart is Indian)

The song is still extremely popular and has been featured in a number of movies since Shree 420 was released. Indian author Mahasweta Devi stopped the show with her inaugural speech at the 2006 Frankfurt Book Fair when she used these lyrics to express her own heartfelt patriotism and debt to her country. It was also used in the opening sequence of 20th Century Studios film Deadpool (2016), starring Ryan Reynolds.

Kapoor appeared in Box Office India's "Top Actors" list twelve times from 1949 to 1960.

Apart from his success as an actor, Kapoor is also considered one of the greatest directors of Indian cinema. The films directed by him, such as Shree 420 (1955), Sangam (1964), Bobby (1973) and Ram Teri Ganga Maili (1985) are among the biggest hits of all time with each one having footfalls ranging from 40 to 50 million or even more.

In 2014, Google commemorated his 90th birthday.

Raj Kapoor was a canny judge of filmi music and lyrics. Many of the songs he commissioned are evergreen hits. He introduced the music directors Shankar–Jaikishan and the lyricists Hasrat Jaipuri and Shailendra. He is also remembered for his strong sense of visual style. He used striking visual compositions, elaborate sets, and dramatic lighting to complete the mood set by the music. He introduced the actresses Nimmi, Dimple Kapadia, and Mandakini, as well as launching and reviving the careers of his sons Rishi, Randhir and Rajiv.

Famous for making his actresses reveal the body, not very common then in Indian cinema, it was said his 'show-womanship' matched his showmanship. He often portrayed women through a deeply sensual and symbolic lens, frequently invoking themes of what he calls "sacred nudity" (muqaddas uriyan in Urdu), a concept he linked to early memories and which manifested in recurring bathing scenes and ethereal female imagery in his films, as he recounts:

I was extremely precocious. And I was a worshipper of nudity. I think it all started because of my intimacy with my mother who was young, beautiful, and had the sharp features of a Pathan woman. We often bathed together, and seeing her in the nude must have left a deep erotic impression on my mind. There is an excellent Urdu phrase, muqaddas uriyan (sacred nudity), which describes this perfectly. In my films, bathing scenes recur often. Women in general occupy most of my early memories, and they appear in my films like ghosts that refuse to be buried.

The 1967 "Song about Yogis" (Russian: Песенка про йогов) by Vladimir Vysotsky mentions Raj Kapoor as one of the three best-known symbols of Indian culture in the Soviet Union, along with Shiva and yoga. In 2022, he was placed in Outlook India's "75 Best Bollywood Actors" list.

In a 1997 interview, Rajendra Kumar recalled, "In the last 30 years of my being in the film industry, I had only one friend who was Raj Kapoor. We couldn't live without each other. We used to meet each other everyday and if not, then we use to converse through telephone, from once, twice to even four times a day. We used to stay, eat, drink, chuckle, cry together, besides discussing about ourselves, our professions, our family, children etc. with each other. Eversince he left us, an important aspect of my life has died too; I have stopped attending parties, functions as we used to go together when he was present. He was a lovely human being. Maa doesn't give birth to Raj Kapoor everyday. Film industry shall never get Raj Kapoor ever again. The world was crazy for him and he deserved so. Someone doesn't attends such a position just like that, something special has to be there in him to ensure God bestows him such a position". In an old interview, Mala Sinha stated, "He (Raj Kapoor) used to recognize the potentials of a person in this field because he was the birth-giver of artists. He gave a new lease of life to many such artists and made them attain success and recognition. That is why, he was able to make such good films because he was able to feel the emotions, sorrows and pain of others. One will notice whenever he used to smile on screen, there was a certain layer of pathos present in his smile. No other actor could showcase pathos with the level of brilliance he could; his eyes reflected both sorrow and joy at the same time, who else but only Raj sahab could do so." In her autobiography The Hit Girl, Asha Parekh stated, "I had also developed a crush on Raj Kapoor. His blue eyes were so magnetic that I can still watch them for a lifetime."

== Awards and honors ==
Kapoor had received many awards throughout his career, including 3 National Film Awards, 11 Filmfare Awards and 21 nominations. His films Awaara (1951) and Boot Polish (1954) were nominated for the Palme d'Or at the Cannes Film Festival. His acting in the former was rated as one of the "Top Ten Performances of All Time in World Cinema" by Time magazine. His film Jagte Raho (1956) also won the Crystal Globe award at the Karlovy Vary International Film Festival.

The Government of India honoured him with the Padma Bhushan in 1971 and the Dadasaheb Phalke Award in 1987 – the highest award for cinematic excellence in India. In 2001, he was honoured with "Best Director of the Millennium" by Stardust Awards. He was named "Showman of the Millennium" by Star Screen Awards in 2002.

In June 2011, Noah Cowan, artistic director of TIFF Bell Lightbox, and Sabbas Joseph, Director, Wizcraft along with members of the Kapoor family came together to pay tribute to the life and work of Indian actor, director, mogul and legend Raj Kapoor, as presented in partnership by TIFF (Toronto International Film Festival), the International Indian Film Academy (IIFA), and the Government of Ontario. In 2011, it was announced that Kapoor will be inducted into the Brampton Walk of Fame in Ontario, Canada. From December 13 to 15, 2024, a special screening of Raj Kapoor's most famous films were held in 40 cities and 135 theaters across India for his 100th Birthday Anniversary celebration.

== Major associations ==
=== Khwaja Ahmad Abbas ===
Khwaja Ahmad Abbas was a screenwriter and director for a number of Raj Kapoor's best films.

- Awaara (1951)
- Anhonee (1952)
- Shree 420 (1955)
- Jagte Raho (1956)
- Char Dil Char Rahen (1959)
- Mera Naam Joker (1970)
- Bobby (1973)
- Henna (1991)

=== Shankar–Jaikishan ===
Shankar–Jaikishan were Raj Kapoor's music directors of choice. He worked with them in 20 films in all including 10 of his own productions from Barsaat until Kal Aaj Aur Kal. (Jagte Raho with Salil Chowdhury and Ab Dilli Dur Nahin with Dattaram, Shankar-Jaikishan's assistant music director, being two exceptions in this period). Only after Jaikishan died, did he turn to a different music director – Laxmikant–Pyarelal for Bobby, Satyam Shivam Sundaram and Prem Rog (later on, his children used Laxmikant-Pyarelal for Prem Granth as well), Rahul Dev Burman for Dharam Karam, and Ravindra Jain for (Ram Teri Ganga Maili and Henna). Raj Kapoor acted in a movie with music by Madan Mohan only once (twice), i.e. Dhoon (1953) & Ashiana (1952), which featured duet Hum Pyaar Karenge by Hemant Kumar and Lata Mangeshkar, the only instance of Hemant Kumar giving playback to Raj Kapoor, and did only one movie with O. P. Nayyar (Do Ustad).

List of films with Shankar–Jaikishan: (18 Films)

- Barsaat (1949)
- Aah (1953)
- Awaara (1951)
- Boot Polish (1954)
- Shree 420 (1955)
- Chori Chori (1956)
- Kanhaiya (1959)
- Main Nashe Men Hoon (1959)
- Jis Desh Men Ganga Behti Hai (1960)
- Aashiq (1962)
- Ek Dil Sao Afsane (1963)
- Sangam (1964)
- Teesri Kasam (1966)
- Around the World (1967)
- Diwana (1967)
- Sapnon Ka Saudagar (1968)
- Mera Naam Joker (1970)
- Kal Aaj Aur Kal (1971)

=== Nargis ===
Raj Kapoor and Nargis worked together in 16 films including 6 of his own productions.

- Aag (1948)
- Andaz (1949)
- Barsaat (1949)
- Pyaar (1950)
- Jan Pahechan (1950)
- Awaara (1951)
- Amber (1952)
- Anhonee (1952)
- Ashiana (1952)
- Bewafa (1952)
- Aah (1953)
- Paapi (1953)
- Dhoon (1953)
- Shree 420 (1955)
- Chori Chori (1956)
- Jagte Raho (1956) (cameo)

=== Mukesh and Manna Dey ===
Mukesh was Raj Kapoor's almost exclusive singing voice in almost all of his films. Also, when Mukesh died, Raj had said, Main ne apni aawaaz ko kho diya... (I have lost my voice...). However Manna Dey has also sung many notable and super-hit songs for Raj Kapoor, for instance in Shree 420 and Chori Chori. Examples of such Manna songs are best illustrated by the following list:

- "Laga Chunri Mein Daag" (Dil Hi To Hai)
- "Ae Bhai Zara Dekh Ke Chalo" (Mera Naam Joker)
- "Dil Ka Haal Sune Dil Wala" (Shree 420)
- "Aaja Sanam Madhur Chandni Mein Hum" (Chori Chori)
- "Jahan Mein Jati Hoon Wahin Chale Aate Ho" (Chori Chori)
- "Yeh Raat Bhigi Bhigi, Yeh Mast Fizayen" (Chori Chori)
- "Masti Bhara Hai Samaan" (Parvarish)
- "Mud Mud Ke Na Dekh" (Shree 420)
- "Pyar hua Iqrar hua hai" (Shree 420)
- "Chalat Musafir" (Teesri Kasam)
- "Belia Belia Belia" (Parvarish)
- "Lallah Allah Tera Nigehbaan" (Abdullah)
- "Mama O Mama" (Parvarish)

== Bibliography ==
- Nanda, Ritu (2002). Raj Kapoor: Speaks. Penguin Books India. ISBN 978-0-670-04952-3.
- Bruzzi, Stella; Gibson, Pamela Church (2000). Fashion Cultures: Theories, Explorations, and Analysis. Routledge. ISBN 978-0-415-20685-3.
- Rajadhyaksha, Ashish; Willemen, Paul (1994). Encyclopedia of Indian Cinema. London: British Film Institute; New Delhi: Oxford University Press. ISBN 978-1-579-58146-6.
- Kishore, Valicha (1988). The Moving Image: A study of Indian cinema. Hyderabad: Orient Longman. ISBN 978-0-861-31681-6.
