= Aag (1948 film) =

1948 Hindi-language film

- Poster
- Directed by: Raj Kapoor
- Written by: Inder Raj Anand (dialogues)
- Screenplay by: Inder Raj Anand
- Story by: Inder Raj Anand
- Produced by: Raj Kapoor
- Starring: Raj Kapoor; Nargis; Premnath; Kamini Kaushal
- Cinematography: V. N. Reddy
- Edited by: Babu Bhai Thakkar
- Music by: Ram Ganguly
- Production company: R. K. Films
- Release date: 6 August 1948
- Running time: 130 mins
- Country: India
- Language: Hindi

Aag (English: Fire) is a 1948 Indian Hindi language musical drama film which is produced, directed by and stars Raj Kapoor. The film marked the debut of Kapoor as producer and director and was the first film produced by his R.K. banner. Nargis, Premnath, Nigar Sultana and Kamini Kaushal also starred in supporting roles. Raj Kapoor's youngest brother Shashi Kapoor appeared as a child artist in this film playing the younger version of his character (Kewal). This marked the first of more than a dozen films in which Raj Kapoor and Nargis appeared together.

== Plot ==
The film opens with a groom approaching his new bride, Sudha, on their wedding night. The bride, upon seeing the groom, screams because his face is disfigured due to burns. The groom then starts telling the bride his story and the remainder of the film is a flashback told to the bride by the groom. The story is about a boy, named Kewal (played by Shashi Kapoor), who is obsessed with theatre but is descended from a family of lawyers. Kewal is smitten by a girl named Nirmala, nicknamed Nimmi, a classmate in school when he was aged 10 years. They both enjoy theatre and Kewal shares his dream of opening a theatre company and starring in his play with Nimmi as the female lead while watching a play in their school. He soon plans to stage a play in his neighbourhood with Nimmi, but she deserts him because her family moves to a different city on the day of the premiere. The young Kewal takes this to heart, but after finishing school, Kewal (now played by Raj Kapoor) reluctantly submits to his father's (Kamal Kapoor) demands to continue the family tradition by studying law and becoming a successful lawyer just like him and his forefathers.

At College, Kewal meets another Nirmala (who asks him to call her Nimmi, after hearing his story of childhood love). He again plans to stage a play, but the second Nimmi also deserts him because her parents have decided to marry her off to a man who lives in England, on the day of the premiere. Kewal is distracted and fails his law exam. This forces him to a reckoning that he has no real interest in becoming a lawyer and would like to pursue his childhood dream of owning his theatre company to write, direct, and produce plays. He argues with his father and is asked to leave the house and despite his mother's protestations, decides to chart his path in life and pursue his dreams. After a little struggle, he luckily finds a patron of the arts named Rajan, (Premnath), who is the owner of a theater company, that has closed down. Kewal and Rajan strike up a creative partnership and a friendship with Kewal writing and producing plays and Rajan financing these. During the preparation for his play, Kewal discovers a woman made homeless by Partition (Nargis) and casts her as the lead in his play.

With the finances and a lead in place, Kewal's dreams can now, at last, be realised; Kewal suggests that Nargis's character (who is not named) takes the name Nimmi (a third incarnation). Rajan is besotted by Nimmi, but Nimmi is in love with Kewal, who remains unaware of Nimmi's feelings towards him. This conflict comes to a head on the opening night of Rajan and Kewal's first production; Rajan goes berserk and rips all his pictures of Nimmi that he has painted. Kewal, only now, discovers the reality of the situation with Rajan and tries to convince Nimmi that she should get together with Rajan, who is his friend and mentor; Nimmi pleads that she is in love with Kewal and not Rajan. The play starts (with Kewal's parents, with whom he has reconciled, in the audience) and Kewal takes a lit torch (the Aag or fire) and burns his face. During this act, of what Kewal perceives as a sacrifice to save his friendship with Rajan, the stage catches fire and the whole production company is burnt to the ground and he is disfigured.

Kewal then confronts Nimmi, who is repulsed by his disfigurement and tells her that she only liked him because of his outer beauty and only the true Nimmi liked him for who he is on the inside. Nimmi (Nargis's version) visits Kewal in the hospital with his face bandaged. Nimmi offers flowers and Kewal notices a ring on her finger which Nimmi tells is her engagement ring from Rajan; Kewal wishes her well and she slips away. The camera cuts back to the present, the wedding night, where Kewal is telling Sudha that his childhood Nimmi understood him and only she will accept him for who he is. Sudha suggests that Kewal would not know if Nimmi was standing in front of him. Sudha turns out to be the original Nimmi (from Kewal's childhood) and accepts Kewal for who he is. Kewal and Nimmi renew their vow of opening a theatre company together.

== Cast ==
- Raj Kapoor as Kewal Khanna
  - Shashi Kapoor as young Kewal Khanna
- Nargis as Nimmi
- Kamini Kaushal as Nirmala alias Nimmi
- Nigar Sultana as Nimmi alias Sudha
- Kamal Kapoor as Kewal Khanna's father
- Premnath as Rajan
- Mohana Cabral as the female lead play performer in the song "Raat Ko Ji Chamke Taare..."
- Vishwa Mehra as the male lead play performer in the song "Raat Ko Ji Chamke Taare..."
- Indumati
- Shree Ram
- Brijmohan
- M. C. Kapoor
- Pushpa
- Shankar
- Sandow
- S. Sethi
- Khera
- Prayag
- Nayyar
- Naidu
- Billoo Kripalani

== Music ==
The music for this film was composed and conducted by Ram Ganguly. For his next film Barsaat, Raj Kapoor took Shankar–Jaikishan as music director and this duo went on to produce subsequent scores for R. K. Films.

The tracks in this film are written by Behzad Lucknavi, Saraswati Kumar 'Deepak' and Majrooh Sultanpuri. The song "Raat Ko Ji Chamke Taare..." was penned by Majrooh Sultanpuri as a free gift to Raj Kapoor who newly turned an independent filmmaker then, but he wasn't credited in the film.

| Title | Singer(s) | Lyricist |
|---|---|---|
| "Dekh Chand Ki Or..." | Shailesh and Meena Kapoor | Saraswati Kumar 'Deepak' |
| "Dil Toot Gaya Ji..." | Shamshad Begum | Behzad Lucknavi |
| "Kahe Koyal Shor Machaye Re..." | Shamshad Begum | Behzad Lucknavi |
| "Na Aankhon Mein Ansog..." | Shamshad Begum | Behzad Lucknavi |
| "Solah Baras Ki Bhari Umariya..." | Mohammad Rafi and Shamshad Begum | Behzad Lucknavi |
| "Zinda Hoon Is Tarah..." | Mukesh | Behzad Lucknavi |
| "Raat Ko Ji Chamke Taare..." | Mukesh and Shamshad Begum | Majrooh Sultanpuri (uncredited) |

== Box office ==
This film was not a major success and did Average business at the box office. As a director, Raj Kapoor had his first major hit with Barsaat (1949).
