= List of awards and nominations received by Mohammed Rafi =

Mohammed Rafi awards and nominations
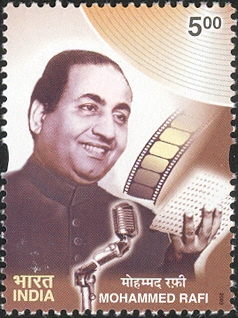
Awards and nominations
Award	Wins	Nominations
National Film Awards	1	0
Filmfare Awards	6	15
Bengal Film Journalists' Association Awards	3	0
Sur Singer Awards	1	0
Honours	4	0

Totals (Note: Certain award groups do not simply award one winner. They acknowledge several different recipients, have runners-up, and have third place. Since this is a specific recognition and is different from losing an award, runner-up mentions are considered wins in this award tally. For simplification and to avoid errors, each award in this list has been presumed to have had a prior nomination.)
- Wins: 15
- Nominations: 15

Mohammed Rafi (24 December 1924 – 31 July 1980) was an Indian playback singer and widely considered to be one of the greatest and most influential singers of the Indian subcontinent. Rafi was notable for his voice, versatility and range; his songs were varied from fast peppy numbers to patriotic songs, sad numbers to highly romantic songs, qawwalis to ghazals and bhajans to classical songs. He was known for his ability to mould his voice to the persona and style of an actor, lip-syncing the song on screen in the movie. He received six Filmfare Awards and one National Film Award. In 1967, he was honoured with the Padma Shri award by the Government of India. In 2001, Rafi was honoured with the "Best Singer of the Millennium" title by Hero Honda and Stardust magazine. In 2013, Rafi was voted for the Greatest Voice in Hindi Cinema in the CNN-IBN's poll.

== National Film Awards ==
Year	Song	Film	Music director	Lyricist	Result
1977	"Kya Hua Tera Wada"	Hum Kisise Kum Naheen	Rahul Dev Burman	Majrooh Sultanpuri	Won

== Filmfare Awards ==
(Note: The category for Best Playback Singer was established in 1959, and until 1967 both male and female singers used to compete for a single award.)

Year	Song	Film	Music director	Lyricist	Result
1960	"Chaudhvin Ka Chand Ho"	Chaudhvin Ka Chand	Ravi	Shakeel Badayuni	Won
1961	"Teri Pyaari Pyaari Surat Ko"	Sasural	Shankar Jaikishan	Hasrat Jaipuri	Won
1961	"Husnwale Tera Jawab Nahin"	Gharana	Ravi	Shakeel Badayuni	Nominated
1962	"Aye Gulbadan Aye Gulbadan"	Professor	Shankar Jaikishan	Hasrat Jaipuri	Nominated
1963	"Mere Mehboob Tujhe"	Mere Mehboob	Naushad Ali	Shakeel Badayuni	Nominated
1964	"Chahunga Main Tujhe"	Dosti	Laxmikant–Pyarelal	Majrooh Sultanpuri	Won
1965	"Chhoo Lene Do Nazuk Hothon Ko"	Kaajal	Ravi	Sahir Ludhianvi	Nominated
1966	"Baharo Phool Barsao"	Suraj	Shankar Jaikishan	Hasrat Jaipuri	Won
1968	"Dil Ke Jharoke Mein"	Brahmachari	Shankar Jaikishan	Hasrat Jaipuri	Won
1968	"Mein Gaaon Tum Sojaao"	Brahmachari	Shankar Jaikishan	Shailendra	Nominated
1969	"Badi Mastani Hai"	Jeene Ki Raah	Laxmikant–Pyarelal	Anand Bakshi	Nominated
1970	"Khilona Jaan Kar"	Khilona	Laxmikant–Pyarelal	Anand Bakshi	Nominated
1973	"Hum Ko To Jaan Se Pyaari"	Naina	Shankar Jaikishan	Hasrat Jaipuri	Nominated
1974	"Achha Hi Huva Dil Toot Gaya"	Maa Bahen Aur Biwi	Sharda	Qamar Jalalabadi, Vedpal Varma	Nominated
1977	"Kya Hua Tera Wada"	Hum Kisise Kum Naheen	R.D. Burman	Majrooh Sultanpuri	Won
1977	"Parda Hai Parda"	Amar Akbar Anthony	Laxmikant–Pyarelal	Anand Bakshi	Nominated
1978	"Aadmi Musaafir Hai"	Apnapan	Laxmikant–Pyarelal	Anand Bakshi	Nominated
1979	"Chalo Re Doli Uthao Kahaar"	Jaani Dushman	Laxmikant–Pyarelal	Varma Malik	Nominated
1980	"Mere Dost Kissa Yeh"	Dostana	Laxmikant–Pyarelal	Anand Bakshi	Nominated
1980	"Dard-e-dil Dard-e-jigar"	Karz	Laxmikant–Pyarelal	Anand Bakshi	Nominated
1980	"Maine Poocha Chand Se"	Abdullah	R.D. Burman	Anand Bakshi	Nominated

== Bengal Film Journalists' Association Awards ==
Year	Film	Music director	Lyricist	Result
1957	Tumsa Nahin Dekha	O. P. Nayyar	Majrooh Sultanpuri	Won
1965	Dosti	Laxmikant–Pyarelal	Majrooh Sultanpuri	Won
1966	Arzoo	Shankar Jaikishan	Hasrat Jaipuri	Won

== Sur Singer Award ==
Year	Film	Music director	Lyricist	Result
1964	Chitralekha	Roshan	Sahir Ludhyanvi	Won

== Honours ==
- 1948 – Rafi received a silver medal from the Indian Prime Minister Jawaharlal Nehru, on the first anniversary of the Indian Independence Day.
- 1967 – Honoured with the Padma Shri by the Government of India.
- 2001 – Rafi was honoured with the "Best Singer of the Millennium" by Hero Honda and Stardust magazine.
- 2013 – Rafi won the CNN-IBN poll for the Greatest Voice in Hindi Cinema.
