= Chintadripet =

Chintadripet Chinna Thari Pettai
- neighbourhood
- Location within Chennai Location within Tamil Nadu Location within India
- Coordinates: 13.0750°N 80.2698°E
- Country: India
- State: Tamil Nadu
- District: Chennai District
- Metro: Chennai
- Zone: 05
- Ward: 62

Government
  - Body: Greater Chennai Corporation
- Elevation: 53 m (174 ft)

Languages
  - Official: Tamil
- Time zone: UTC+5:30 (IST)
- PIN: 600002
- Planning agency: CMDA
- Civic agency: Greater Chennai Corporation
- Website: www.chennai.tn.nic.in

Chintadripet (originally Chinna Thari Pettai) is a locality in Chennai, in India. Located on the southern banks of the Cooum River, it is a residential-cum-commercial area surrounded by Chepauk, Island Grounds, Pudupet, Egmore, Anna Salai and Chennai Central

== The neighbourhood ==
Ritchie Street, the electronic hub of Chennai, is located in Chintadripet. The area is served by the Chintadripet MRTS Railway Station abutting the Cooum River. The neighbourhood is an auto service hub and is also known for its fish market.

== Politics ==
The Chintadripet area comes under the Chepauk–Triplicane assembly constituency. The neighbourhood bears the assembly constituency number 19.

== Religion ==
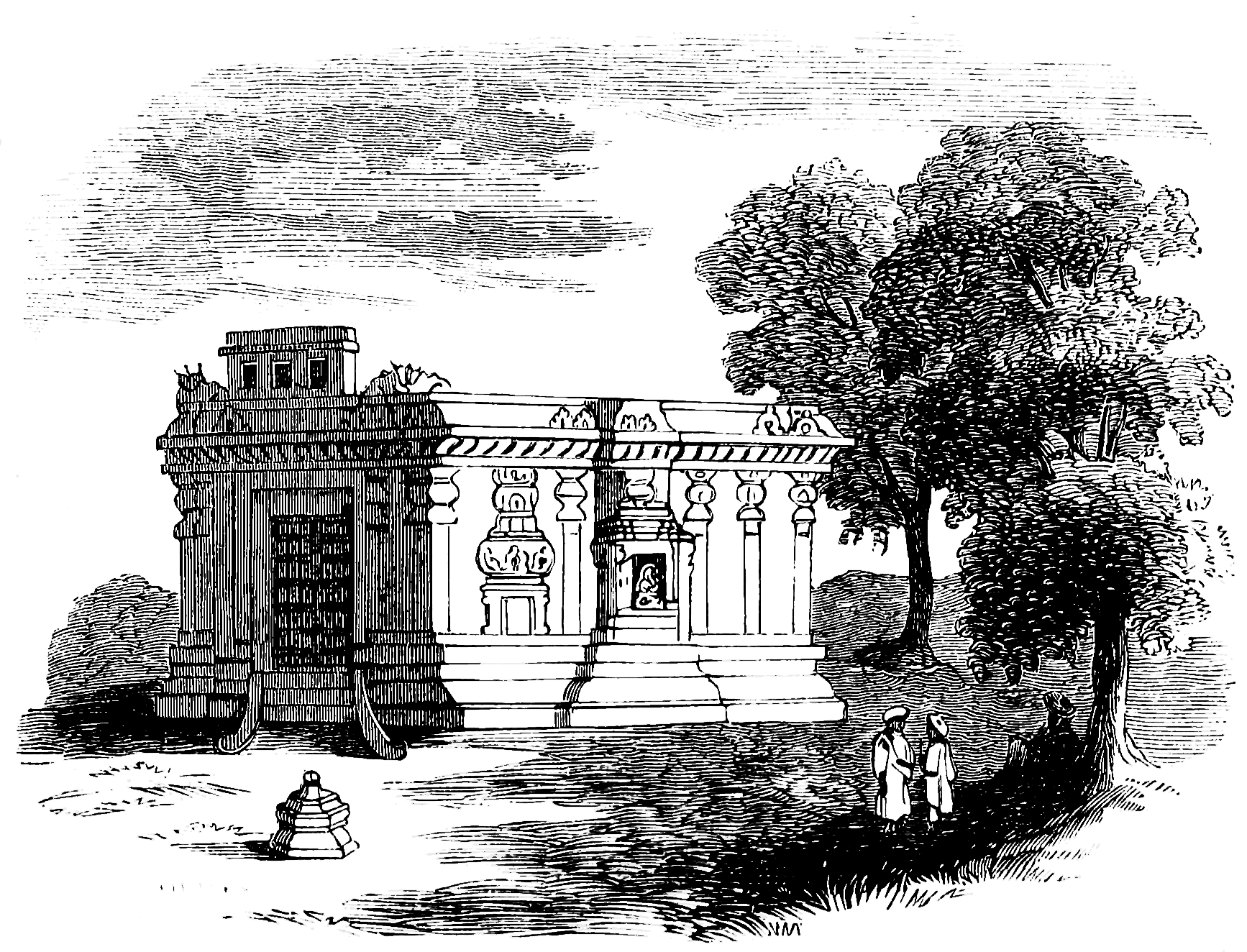
A small temple to Ganesha at Chintadripet. Illustration in 1850s

There is a twin temple dedicated to Lord Shiva (Adipureeswarar Temple) and Lord Vishnu (Adi Kesava Perumal), planned and developed by the weavers during the 1740s. There is also a Jain temple in the neighbourhood. There is Zion Church, which is over 150 years old.

== Parks ==
The May Day Park, originally known as Napier Park, is located on Deputy Mayor Kabalamoorthy Road in Chintadripet. The park covers about 14.5 acres. There are facilities for cricket, football, volleyball and badminton on the eastern and western sides of the park. The park has been adopted and maintained by Simpson & Co.
