= Kamaleswarar Temple =

Komaleeswarar Temple

Religion
- Affiliation: Hinduism
- District: Chennai
- Deity: Lord Komaleeswarar

Location
- Location: Chennai
- State: Tamil Nadu
- Country: India
- Interactive map of Komaleeswarar Temple
- Coordinates: 13°04′08″N 80°15′59″E

Komaleeswarar Temple is a Hindu temple located in the neighbourhood of Pudupet in Chennai, India. The temple is popular due to its association with the 18th century dubash, Pachaiyappa Mudaliar.
