= 12th Filmfare Awards =

1965 awards for Hindi cinema

- Date: 1965
- Site: Bombay

Highlights
- Best Film: Dosti
- Best Actor: Dilip Kumar for Leader
- Best Actress: Vyjayanthimala for Sangam
- Most awards: Dosti (6)
- Most nominations: Sangam (11)

The 12th Filmfare Awards were held in 1965, honoring the best Hindi films released over the previous year.

Sangam led the ceremony with 11 nominations, followed by Dosti with 7 nominations and Shehar Aur Sapna with 4 nominations.

Dosti won 6 awards, including Best Film and Best Music Director (Laxmikant–Pyarelal), thus becoming the most-awarded film at the ceremony.

Sangam was the runner-up of the ceremony with 4 awards, including Best Director (for Raj Kapoor) Best Actress (for Vyjayanthimala).

== Main awards ==
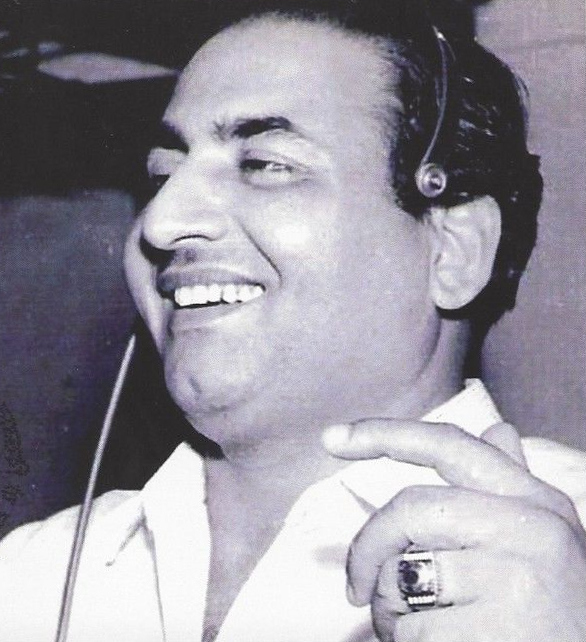
Mohammed Rafi, Best Playback Singer

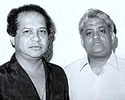
Laxmikant–Pyarelal, Best Music Director

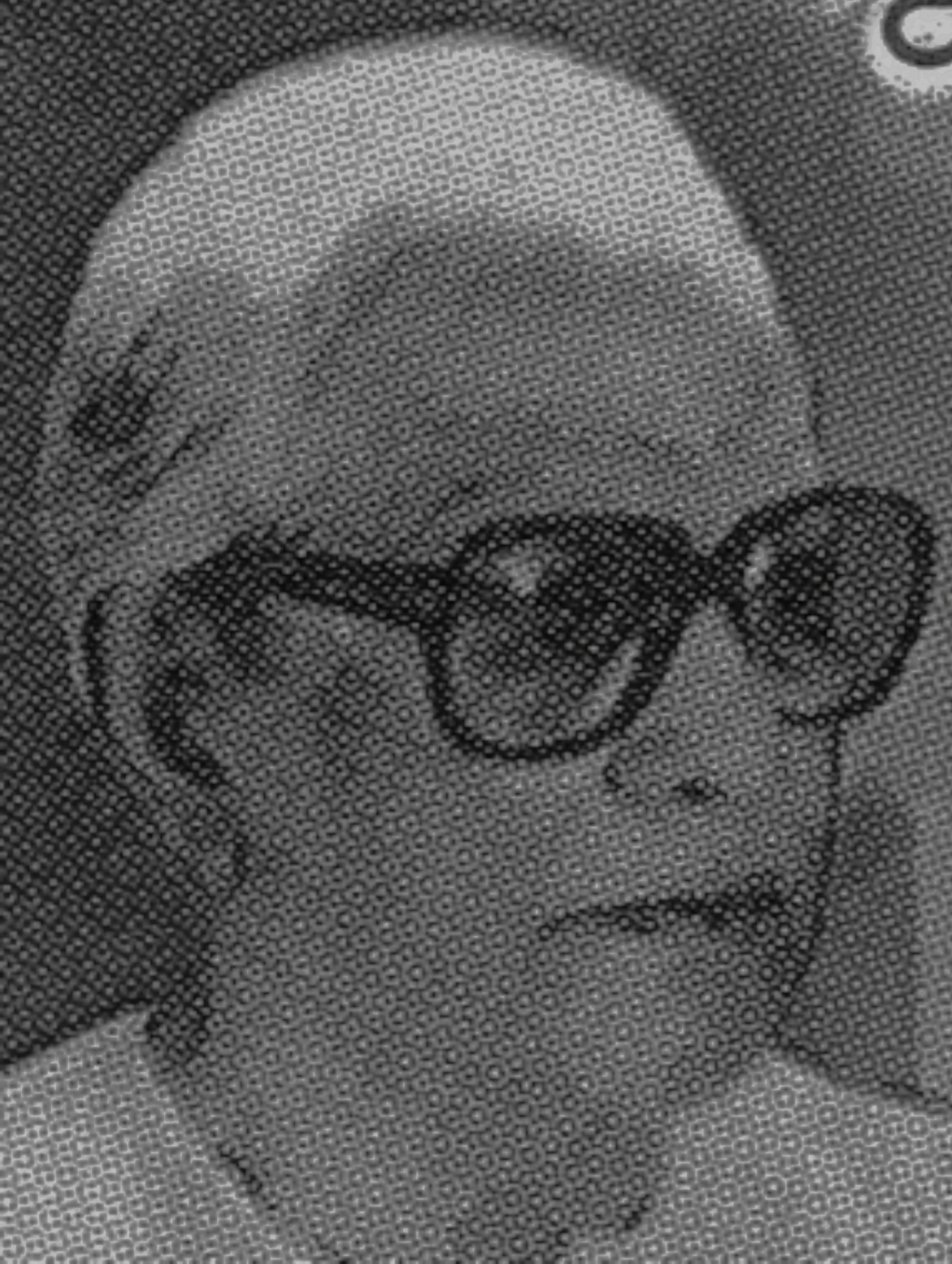
Majrooh Sultanpuri, Best Lyricist

Best Film	Best Director
Dosti – Rajshri Productions – Tarachand Barjatya; Sangam – R. K. Films – Raj Kapoor; Shehar Aur Sapna – Naya Sansar – Khwaja Ahmad Abbas	Raj Kapoor – Sangam; Khwaja Ahmad Abbas – Shehar Aur Sapna; Satyen Bose – Dosti
Best Actor	Best Actress
Dilip Kumar – Leader as Vijay Khanna; Raj Kapoor – Sangam as Flight Lt. Sundar Khanna; Rajendra Kumar – Ayee Milan Ki Bela as Shyam	Vyjayanthimala – Sangam as Radha Mehra; Mala Sinha – Jahan Ara as Jahanara Begum; Sadhana Shivdasani – Woh Kaun Thi? as Sandhya / Sandhya's twin sister
Best Supporting Actor	Best Supporting Actress
Nana Palsikar – Shehar Aur Sapna as Johnny; Dharmendra – Ayee Milan Ki Bela as Ranjit; Rajendra Kumar – Sangam as Mag. Gopal Verma	Nirupa Roy – Shehnai as Shobha; Lalita Pawar – Kohra as Dai Maa; Shashikala – Ayee Milan Ki Bela as Roopa
Best Music Director	Best Lyricist
Laxmikant–Pyarelal – Dosti; Madan Mohan – Woh Kaun Thi?; Shankar–Jaikishan – Sangam	Majrooh Sultanpuri – "Chahunga Main Tujhe" from Dosti; Shailendra – "Dost Dost Naa Raha" from Sangam; Bharat Vyas – "Jyot Se Jyot" from Sant Gyaneshwar
Best Playback Singer – Male	Best Playback Singer – Female
Mohammed Rafi – "Chahunga Main Tujhe" from Dosti; Mukesh – "Dost Dost Naa Raha" from Sangam	Award won by a male singer; Lata Mangeshkar – "Jyot Se Jyot" from Sant Gyaneshwar
Best Story	Best Dialogue
Ban Bhatt – Dosti; Inder Raj Anand – Sangam; Khwaja Ahmad Abbas – Shehar Aur Sapna	Govind Moonis – Dosti

== Technical Awards ==
Best Art Direction	Best Cinematography
G. L. Jadhav and T. K. Desai – Kohra (for B/W); Sant Singh – Jahan Ara (for Color)	K. H. Kapadia – Woh Kaun Thi? (for B/W); Krishnarao Vashirde – Geet Gaya Pattharon Ne (for Color)
Best Editing	Best Sound Design
Raj Kapoor – Sangam	Allauddin – Sangam

== Superlatives ==
The following films had multiple wins and/or nominations

Movie	Awards	Nominations
Dosti	6	7
Sangam	4	11
Shehar Aur Sapna	1	4
Woh Kaun Thi?	1	3
Jahan Ara	1	2
Kohra	1	2
Ayee Milan Ki Bela	0	3
Sant Gyaneshwar	0	2

== See also ==
- 14th Filmfare Awards
- 13th Filmfare Awards
- Filmfare Awards
