= Government Estate metro station =

Chennai Metro's Blue Line metro station

Government Estate

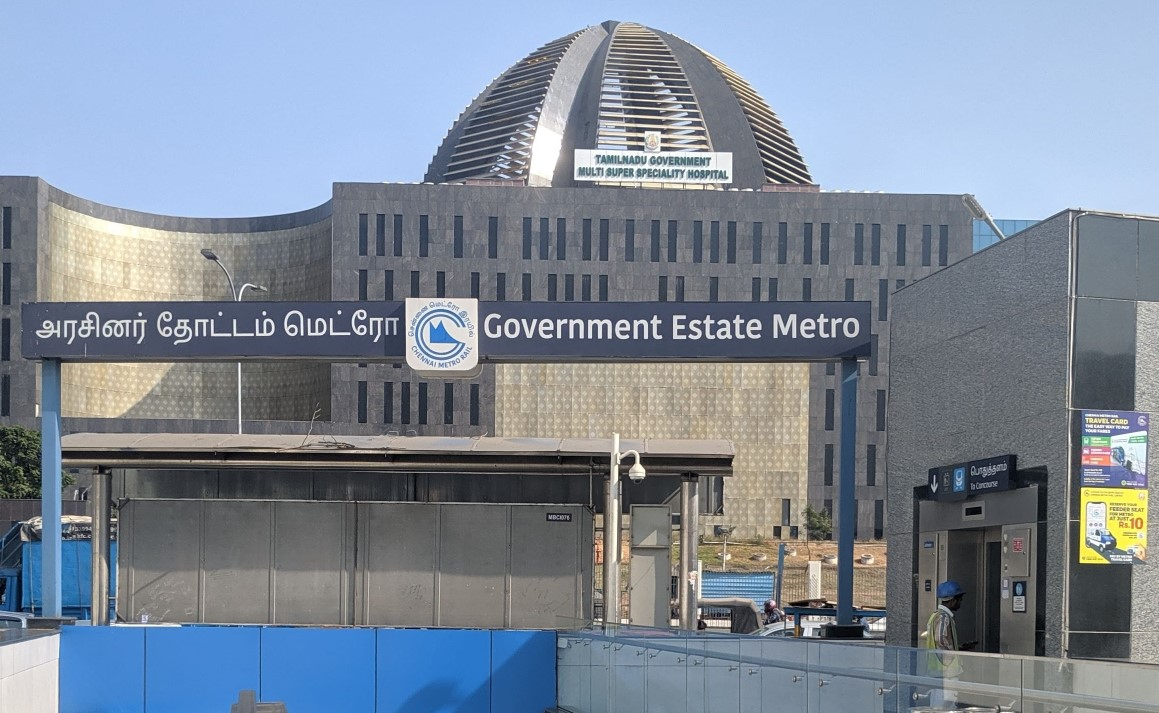

General information
- Location: Anna Salai, Mount Road, Triplicane, Chennai, Tamil Nadu 600005; India
- Coordinates: 13°04′10″N 80°16′20″E
- System: Chennai Metro station
- Owner: Chennai Metro
- Operator: Chennai Metro Rail Limited (CMRL)
- Line: Blue Line
- Platforms: Island platform Platform-1 → Chennai International Airport (to be extended to Kilambakkam in the future); Platform-2 → Wimco Nagar Depot
- Tracks: 2
- Connections: Chintadripet

Construction
- Structure type: Underground, Double Track
- Parking: No
- Accessible: Yes

Other information
- Station code: SGE

History
- Opened: 10 February 2019; 7 years ago
- Electrified: Single phase 25 kV, 50 Hz AC through overhead catenary

Services
| Preceding station | Chennai Metro | Following station |
|---|---|---|
| Chennai Central towards Wimco Nagar Depot | Blue Line | LIC towards Chennai International Airport |
| Chennai Central towards Wimco Nagar Depot | Blue Line (Future Service) | LIC towards Kilambakkam |
Route map
Location

Government Estate is an underground metro station on the North-South Corridor of the Blue Line of Chennai Metro in Chennai, India. This station serves the neighbourhoods of Chepauk, Triplicane and Chintadripet. The station is named so because of the presence of the Omandurar Government Estate in the vicinity. This metro station is very much useful for visitors to Ritchie Street and Ellis Road which are two very big commercial streets in Chennai city. The station was opened for public on 10 February 2019. However, some portions of the construction work remains incomplete on the date of inauguration.

== Station layout ==
| G | Street level | Exit/Entrance |
| M | Mezzanine | Fare control, station agent, Ticket/token, shops |
| P | Platform 1 Southbound | Towards → Chennai International Airport; Next Station: LIC (to be further extended to Kilambakkam in the future) |
| P | Island platform | Doors will open on the right |
| P | Platform 2 Northbound | Towards ← Wimco Nagar Depot; Next Station: M.G.R. Chennai Central Change at the next station for Green Line |

=== Facilities ===
List of available ATM at Government Estate metro station are

== Connections ==
=== Bus ===
Metropolitan Transport Corporation (Chennai) bus routes number 1A, 1B, 1C, 1D, 1J, 2A, 3A, 5C, 6A, 11A, 11G, 18A, 18D, 18E, 18K, 18R, 21, 22B, 26, 26B, 26CUT, 26J, 26M, 26R, 27B, 27BCUT, 27BET, 27E, 32, 38C, 40, 51J, 51P, 52, 52B, 52P, 60, 60A, 60D, 60H, 88A, 118A, 138C, 188, 221, 221H, A1, A51, B18, D51, E18, M21C, M51R, serves the station from nearby Simson bus stand.

=== Rail ===
Chintadripet railway station

== Entry/Exit ==
Government Estate metro station Entry/exits
| Gate No-A1 | Gate No-A2 | Gate No-A3 | Gate No-A4 |

== See also ==
- Chennai
- Chintadripet
- Cooum River
- List of Chennai metro stations
- Chennai Metro
- Railway stations in Chennai
- Chennai Mass Rapid Transit System
- Chennai Monorail
- Chennai Suburban Railway
- Chintadripet railway station
- Chennai International Airport
- Transport in Chennai
- Urban rail transit in India
- List of metro systems
