= Appur =

- Village
- Location in Tamil Nadu, India
- Coordinates: 12.8031393°N 79.9765448°E
- Country: India
- State: Tamil Nadu
- District: Chengalpattu

Population (2011)
  - Total: 1,244

Languages
  - Official: Tamil
- Time zone: UTC+5:30 (IST)
- PIN: 603204

Appur is a panchayat village located in Chengalpattu district of Tamil Nadu, India. It is located about 56 kilometers from Chennai. The nearest town is Maraimalainagar, which is 7 kilometers away.

== The village ==
Appur is located in the Chengalpattu block in Kancheepuram district. It covers an area of 488.72 hectares. As per 2011 census, the population of the village was 1,244, including 603 male and 641 female. The village is home to about 301 households. As of 2009, the village is a gram panchayat.

== Auto Nagar ==
In 2018, the government allotted about 40 acres of land in the village for the creation of new Auto Nagar to rehabilitate 383 auto service shop vendors at Pudupet in Chennai.

== See also ==
- Singaperumal Koil
- Maraimalainagar
