= Ramalinga Swamigal =

Tamil saint and poet (1823–1874)

Ramalinga Swamigal aka Thiruvarut Prakasa Vallalar
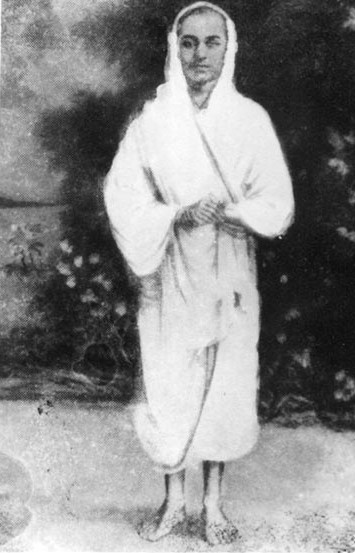
- Born: 5 October 1823; Marudur, Chidambaram (present-day Cuddalore district, Tamil Nadu, India)
- Disappeared: January 30, 1874 (aged 50); Mettukuppam, Vadalur, Cuddalore district, Tamil Nadu

Thiruvarutprakasa Vallalār Chidambaram Ramalingam (5 October 1823) – 30 January 1874) also known as Vallalār, Ramalinga Swamigal and Ramalinga Adigal, was a Tamil saint who preached the philosophy of Jeevakarunyam, which emphasizes on ahimsa and vegetarianism. Some aspects of these encompassed feeding the hungry and also seeing the existence of God in all things, living or non-living. He is a renowned thinker of the 19th century who teaches deathlessness. He belongs to a line of Tamil saints who speaks about Siddhi meaning getting merged with the supreme God known as Arulperumjothi gnana siddhars" (gnana means 'higher wisdom').

Ramalinga ventured to eliminate the caste system in India. To that end, he founded a group known as Samarasa Suddha Sanmarga Sathiya Sangam, which spread not only due to his theoretical teachings also due to his practiced lifestyle, which was an inspiration for his followers. According to Suddha Sanmarga, the prime aspects of human life should be love connected with charity and divine practice leading to achievement of pure knowledge.

Ramalinga espoused the veneration of the radiant flame emanating from a lit lamp, not as a deity unto itself, but rather as a symbol representing the enduring omnipotence of the Divine, as opposed to the adoration of statues within a monotheistic framework.

== Early life ==
Ramalingam's (Note: 'Ramalingam' was his given, pre-monastic name.) parents were Ramayya Pillai and Chinnammai of Karuneegar Pillai caste. She was his sixth wife, as all his previous wives had died childless and in quick succession. They were a family in Marudhur, a village in the old South Arcot district, near Chidambaram. Ramalingam was their fifth and youngest child. The older ones were two sons, Sabhapati and Parasu Rāman; and two daughters, Sundarammal and Unnamulai.

=== Childhood and divine experiences ===
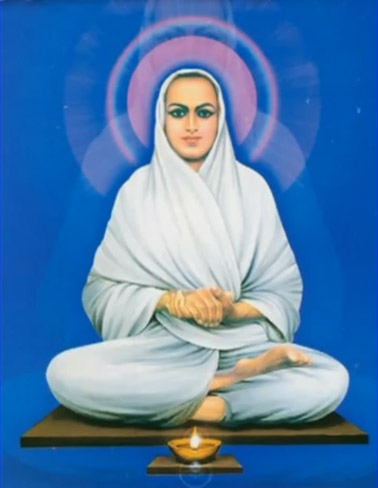
A modern depiction of Vallalar

When Ramalingam was five months old, his parents brought him to the Chidambaram Natarājar Temple. The infant was joyous while the priest was offering Deepa Aradhana (adoration by a lighted lamp being brought close to the vigrahams); this was perceived by Ramalingam as a deep spiritual experience. In later years, he said of the experience: "No sooner the Light was perceived, happiness prevailed on me", and "The sweet nectar was tasted by me as soon as the Arul Perum Jothi (Divine Light of Grace) became visible".

In 1824, his father died. Following this, his mother moved to her mother's residence at Chinna Kāvanam, Ponneri. Ramalingam was a small child when he and his mother relocated to Chennai in 1826, where they lived with his eldest brother Sabhapati and his wife Pāppāthi at 31/14 Veerasamy Pillai Street in the Sevenwells area. (Note: The locality where he lived has been renamed 'Vallalār Nagar'.)

After Ramalingam reached five years of age, Sabhapati initiated his formal education. However, uninterested in his education, Ramalingam instead preferred trips to the nearby Kandha Kottam Kandha Swāmi Temple. (Note: Ramalingam composed 'Deiva Mani Malai' at this temple. Today, this temple has a hall called the Mukha Mandapam, which contains an idol of Sri Rāmalinga Swāmigal, as well as Sarva Siddhi Vinayakar, Meenakshi Sundareswarar, Idumban, and Pamban Swāmigal.) Sabhapati thought that the child needed punishment as a form of discipline, and he told his wife not to give Ramalingam his daily meal. His kind sister-in-law, however, secretly gave him food and persuaded him to study seriously at home. In return, Ramalingam asked for his own room, lighted lamp and mirror. He placed the light in front of the mirror and meditated by concentrating on the light. He miraculously saw a vision of the Lord Muruga. Ramalingam said: "The beauty endowed divine faces six, the illustrious shoulders twelve."

At one time, Ramalingam had to replace his elder brother Sabhapati at an Upanyāsam (religious stories) session as upāsakar. His great discourse on verses from the Periya Purānam, an epic poem by Sekkizhar about the saintly '63 Nāyanārs', was appreciated by the devotees as being given by a very learned scholar. Ramalingam's mental and spiritual growth progressed rapidly. Ramalingam gave thanks to the Divine by saying: "Effulgent flame of grace, that lit in me intelligence, to know untaught." Ramalingam evolved in his spiritual journey from being a devout devotee of Lord Shiva to worshiping the formless.

Ramalingam renounced the world at the young age of thirteen, but he was forced to marry his niece (on his sister's side). Legends say that the bridegroom during his first night after marriage was reading devotional works like the Thiruvāsagam. He was not interested in money, and it is said that in later life he reduced or ignored eating and sleeping. But he seemed fit in body, which was believed to be due to his supposed "physical transformation".

== Teachings ==
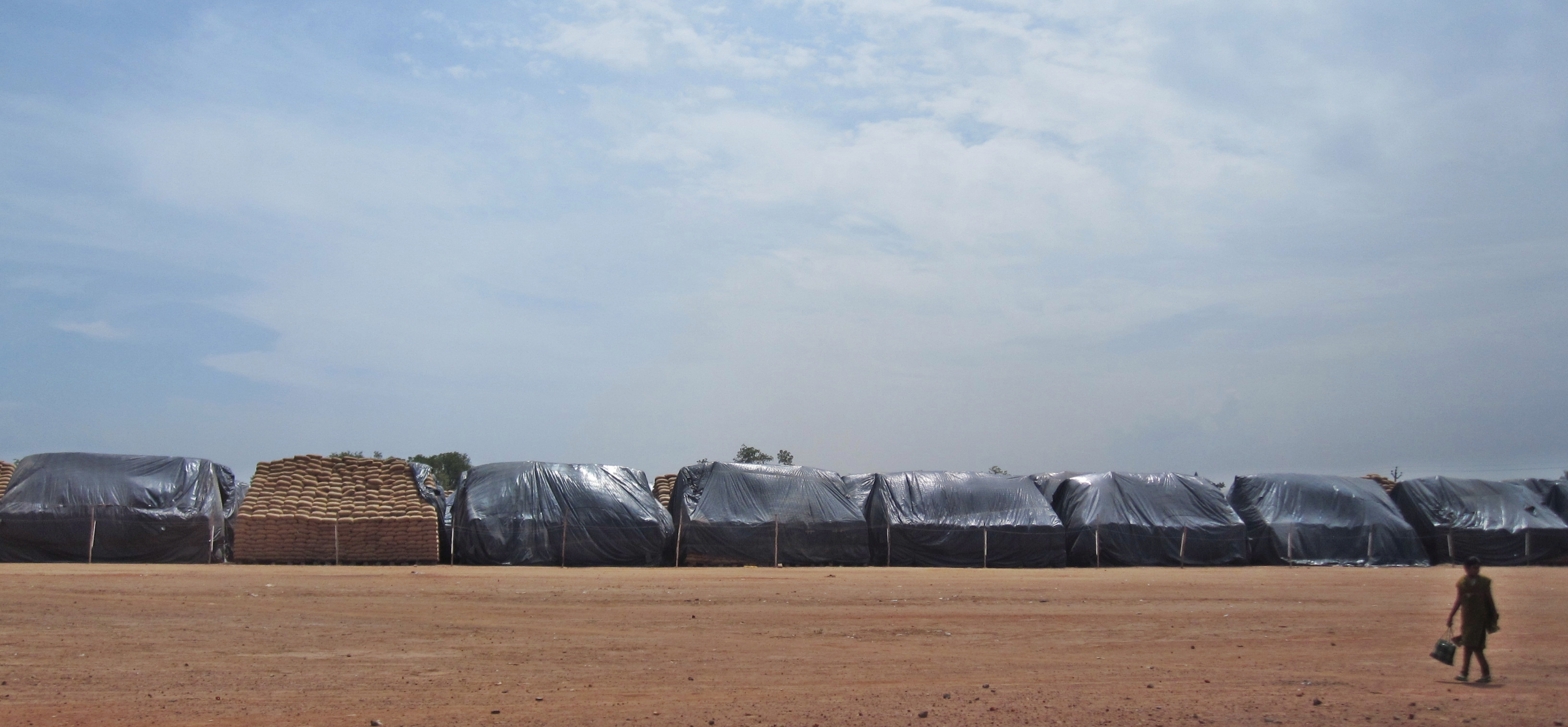
Heaps of grain bags at Sathya Gnana Sabhai, Vadalur, established by Ramalinga

Ramalinga left Chennai in 1858. First, he went to Chidambaram where he had a debate with Kodakanallur Sundara Swāmigal. At the request of one Rāmakrishna Reddiyar, he went to his house at Karunguzhi (near Vadalur) and stayed there for nine years. He was against the caste system because of the adverse impacts it had on society. Towards that end, he started a guild of devotees called the "Samarasa Vedha Sanmarga Sangam" in 1865. In 1872, it was renamed "Samarasa Suddha Sanmarga Sathya Sangam", meaning "Society for pure truth in universal self-hood". Ramalinga was influenced by Valluvar and was drawn towards the teachings of the Tirukkural from a young age. He soon started teaching its message by conducting regular Kural classes to the masses. He vowed to follow the Kural's morals of compassion and non-violence and continued emphasizing non-killing and meatless diet throughout his life by his concept of Jeeva Karunyam ('compassion for living beings'). He said:

When I see men feeding on the coarse and vicious food of meat, it is an ever-recurring grief to me.

In 1867, Ramalinga established a facility named "The Sathya Dharma Salai" in Vadalur for serving free food to the poor. On the inaugural day, he lit the fire of the stone stove, with a declaration that the fire be ever alive and the needy shall be fed forever. The facility, still in existence and run by volunteers, continues to serve free food to all people, without any caste distinction. The land for the facility was donated by kind, generous people, and visitors can view the registration documents.

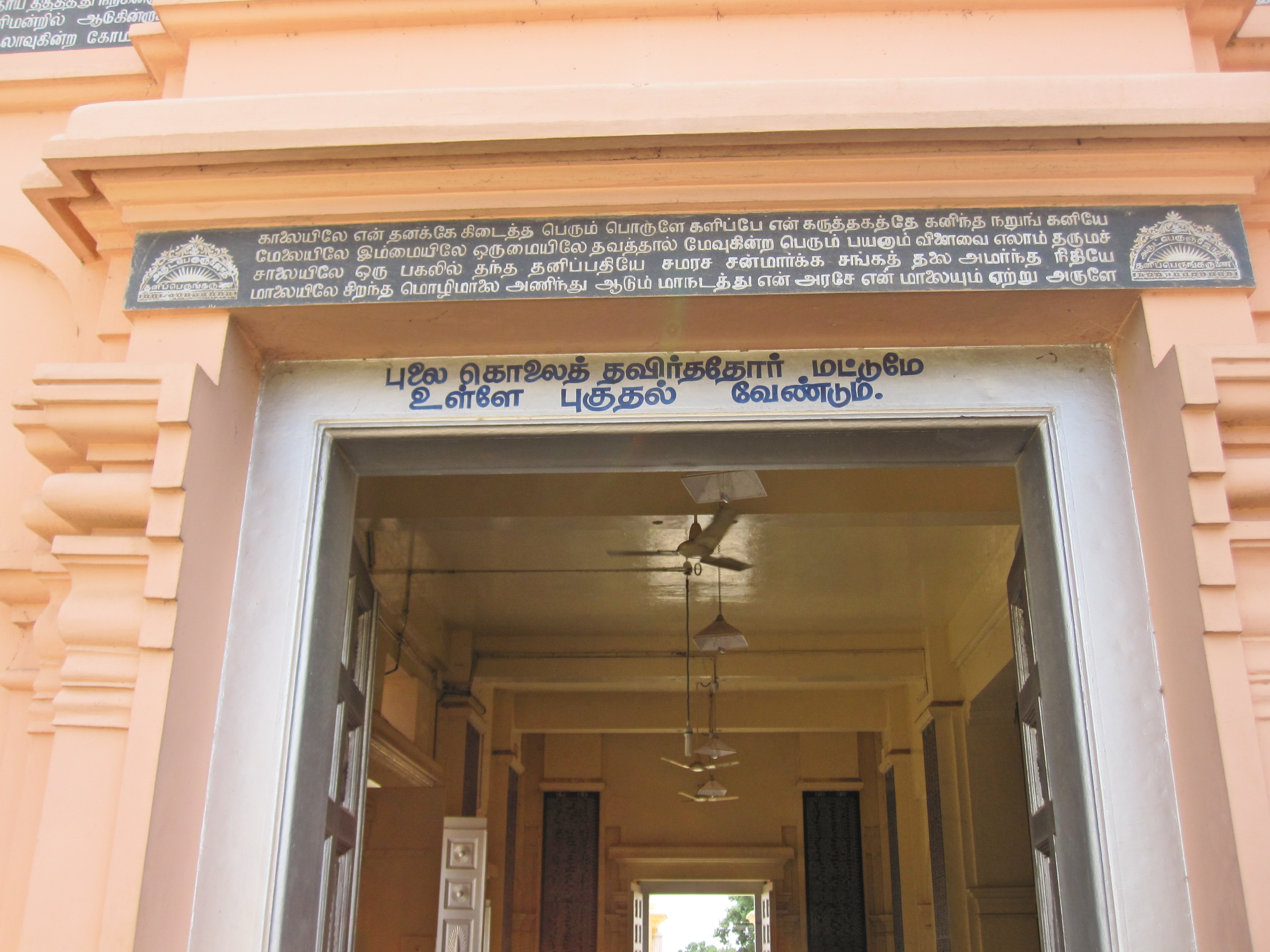
Entrance to the Sathya Gnana Sabha. The sign above it reads, "only those who have renounced meat and murder should enter".

On 25 January 1872, Ramalinga opened the "Sathya Gnana Sabhai" (Hall of True Knowledge) at Vadalur. This secular place is not a temple; there are no offerings, and no blessings are given. It is open to people of all castes except those who eat meat, who are only allowed to worship from the outside. The oil lamp lit by Ramalinga is kept perpetually burning. Ramalinga himself wrote in detail about the pooja to be performed in Gnana Sabhai—visitors below 12 or above 72 years of age alone were expected to enter Gnana Sabhai and do poojas.

Within the complex are seven cotton fabric screens, representing the seven factors that prevent a soul from realizing its true nature. The entire complex is bound by a chain with 21,600 links, said to represent '21,600 inhalations' by a normal human being. He said the intelligence we possess is Maya intelligence, which is not the true and final intelligence. The path of final intelligence is Jeeva Karunyam.

Vallalār (Ramalinga) advocated a casteless society, and condemned inequality based on birth. He was opposed to superstitions and rituals. He forbade killing animals, even for the sake of food. He advocated feeding the poor as the highest form of worship. He also forbade idol worship, as he is historically said to have strongly opposed idols of Hindu gods and those made of himself by his followers. His rejection of idol worship was based on his belief in a formless, universal divine presence, rather than devotion to physical representations of God.

Vallalār advocated a spiritual path free from ritualistic practices, superstitions, and reliance on physical idols. His teachings emphasized compassion, love for all beings, and the pursuit of enlightenment, which he felt could not be achieved through the worship of idols or rituals. He encouraged his followers to focus on the formless divine and inner spirituality, rather than external symbols.

One of the main teachings of Ramalinga is "Service to Living Beings is the path of Liberation (Moksha)". He declared that death is not natural, and that life's first priority should be to fight death. He declared religion in itself a darkness. He said God is "Arul Perum Jothi" (Divine Light of Grace), the personification of grace or mercy and knowledge, and that the path of compassion and mercy is the only path to God. Today, there are spiritual groups spread out all over the world who practice his teachings and follow the path of Arut Perum Jothi.

== Literary works ==
As a musician and poet, Ramalinga composed 5,818 poems teaching universal love and peace, compiled into 'Six Thiru Muraigal', which are all available today as a single book called Thiruvarutpa ('holy book of grace'). He wanted people to read only the last of the six volumes of the "Thiruvarutpa" as the older volumes were written with an incomplete experiences. His ideology wants the people to attain "Wisdom Body" just like him. One among the last poetic title within the "6th Thiruarutpa" is called "Gnanasariyai" which contains 28 poems. People who are familiar with samarasa suththa sanmargam asks the new comers to read "Gnanasariyai" to understand the "Perubadesam"(Available for free download in the internet)which is his last speech before entering the hut in "Mettukkup(p)pam" to understand his journey. He composed the Veeraraghva Panchakam dedicated to Veeraraghava Perumal located in Tiruvallur.

Other works of his include the Manumurai Kanda Vāsagam, which describes the life of Manu Needhi Cholan, and Jeeva Karuanya Ozhukkam, which emphasizes compassion towards all sentient forms and insists on a plants-only diet.

=== Songs set to music ===
- Thiruvarutpa songs of Rāmalinga Swāmigal are sung in concerts, and now at least 25 songs (in Thiruvarutpā Isai Mālai) are given with swara-tāla notation.
- Thāyāgi thandhaiyumai (Hamsadhwani), Idu nalla tharunam (Shankarābharanam)
- Varuvar azhaithu vadi (Begada) and Thaen ena inikkum.

Some of his songs were set to music by Sīrkāzhi Govindharājan.

== Disappearance ==
On 22 October 1873, Ramalinga raised the 'flag of Brotherhood' on his one-room residence Siddhi Valāgam in Mettukuppam. He gave his final lecture—about spiritual progress and the "nature of the powers that lie beyond us and move us"—and recommended meditation using the lighted lamp from his room, which he then kept outside.

On 30 January 1874, Ramalinga entered the room, locked himself inside and told his followers not to open it. After opening, he said, he would not be found there. (He will be "united with nature and ruling the actions of 'all of the alls'," as told in his poem Gnana Sariyai). His seclusion spurred many rumors, and the government finally forced the doors open in May. The room was empty, with no clues. In 1906, records about his disappearance were published in the South Arcot District's Madras District Gazetteers. Recent scholarship has noted how his disappearance bears a striking resemblance to the Rainbow Body phenomenon.

== Postage stamp ==
On 17 August 2007, M. Karunanidhi, the then Chief Minister of Tamil Nadu, released postage stamps depicting Ramalinga. After that, writ petition was submitted against the portrayal of Ramalinga with 'Thiru Neeru' (sacred ash) on his forehead. The Madras High Court declined to entertain that writ petition.

== In popular culture ==
Two biographical films were made about Ramalinga Swamigal.

Year	Film	Actor	Note
1939	Jothi	K. A. Muthu Bhagavathar	Lost film
1971	Arutperunjothi	Master Sridhar	Young Ramalingam
1971	Arutperunjothi	A. P. Nagarajan	Adult Ramalingam

To commemorate Vallalar's 200th birth anniversary in 2022, a mosaic art piece was created using more than 5,000 small pieces of paper.

== See also ==
- Jothi Agaval
- Rainbow Body
- Arutperunjothi (1971 film)
- Jothi (1939 film)
- List of people who disappeared
