= Arutperunjothi =

- DVD cover
- Directed by: A. T. Krishnaswamy
- Written by: A. T. Krishnaswamy
- Produced by: T. S. Balachandran
- Starring: Master Sridhar; A. P. Nagarajan; K. A. Thangavelu; M. Saroja; Devaki; T. S. Balaiah
- Cinematography: T. V. Balu
- Edited by: Vasu
- Music by: T. R. Pappa
- Production company: Balu Films
- Release date: 5 June 1971
- Running time: 126 minutes
- Country: India
- Language: Tamil

Arutperunjothi is a 1971 Indian Tamil language devotional film based on the life of Ramalinga Swamigal (popularly known as Vallalar) directed by A. T. Krishnaswamy, starring Master Sridhar, A. P. Nagarajan, K. A. Thangavelu, M. Saroja, Devaki, and T. S. Balaiah. It was released on 5 June 1971.

== Cast ==
- Master Sridhar
- A. P. Nagarajan
- K. A. Thangavelu
- M. Saroja
- Devaki
- T. S. Balaiah
- Ennathe Kannaiah
- Pandari Bai

== Production ==
This was the last film of A. T. Krishnaswamy.

== Soundtrack ==
The film's music is composed by T. R. Pappa. All the lyrics are composed by Ramalinga Swamigal. Playback singers are Sirkazhi Govindarajan, S. Janaki, T. V. Rathnam

- Arutperunjothi Arutperunjothi (Title Song)
- Thiruvonki Punniya
- Neerundu Poligindra
- Seergonda Theiva
- Allutha Pillaikei
- Pettra Thaai
- Paarthalum Ninaithalum
- Varuvar Alaithu
- Arutjothi Theivamyenai

== See also ==
- Ramalinga Swamigal
- Jothi Agaval
- Jothi (1939 film)
