= Shehar Aur Sapna =

- Poster
- Directed by: Khwaja Ahmad Abbas
- Story by: Khwaja Ahmad Abbas
- Produced by: Naya Sansar
- Starring: Dilip Raj; Nana Palsikar; David .
- Cinematography: Ramachandra
- Music by: J. P. Kaushik
- Release date: 1963
- Running time: 120 minutes
- Country: India
- Language: Hindi

Shehar Aur Sapna (lit. 'The City and the Dream') is a 1963 Hindi film directed by Khwaja Ahmad Abbas, about a young couple searching in vain for a home of their own in a metropolis, amidst the backdrop of rapidly developing city, and the many who flocked to it in hope of a better life. It won the 1964 National Film Award for Best Feature Film and was nominated for Filmfare Award for Best Film.

== Synopsis and themes ==
It was based on Abbas's own story One Thousand Nights on a Bed of Stones, which describes the struggle in the life of pavement dwellers against the backdrop of rapid industrialization. The theme of the film signified a marked departure from the films made in the 1950s, the opening decade of independent India, as by now the euphoria seen in films such as Naya Daur (1957) and Boot Polish (1954) had been replaced by realism and the death of economic idealism. This was also seen in later films such as Roti Kapda Aur Makaan (1974) and Mani Kaul's Uski Roti (1969), as industrialization did not turn out to be a boon for the masses as promised.

== Production ==
Abbas used his own experiences of sleeping on the footpath at one point in his life, as he had used in his three other films. To prepare for shooting the city "figuratively", he walked about the city under all weather, to be able to recreate the settings for the emotional landscape of the film. Though most scenes were shot outdoors, in Mumbai slums and on roads, on a shoestring budget, for crucial scenes, the cylindrical drainpipes were carried to the studios to recreate the life of the urban poor indoors, complete with slums and huts by the railway line.

== Awards ==
- 1963: National Film Award for Best Feature Film
- 1964 Academy of Art award for Direction.
- 1964: Filmfare Awards
  - Best Supporting Actor - Nana Palsikar: Won
  - Best Film: Nominated
  - Best Director: K.A. Abbas: Nominated
  - Best Story: K.A. Abbas: Nominated
  - Uttar Pradesh Film Journalist's Assn. Lucknow Award for Best Music/Director: J.P. Kaushik
  - Bengal Film Journalist's Assn. Calcutta Award for Best Music/Director: J.P. Kaushik

== Cast ==
- Dilip Raj Son of P. Jairaj
- Surekha Parkaar
- Manmohan Krishan
- Anwar Hussain
- David
- Nana Palsikar as Jhonny
- Asit Sen
- Jagdish Kamal
- Rashid Khan
- Kamlakar Rele (Thief)

== Music ==
1. "Hazar Ghar Hazar Dar Yeh Sab Hain Ajnabi Magar" - Manmohan Krishna
2. "Patthar Ka Bhagwan Yehan Hain" - Manmohan Krishna
3. "Pyaar Ko Aaj Nayi Tarh Nibhana Hoga" - Manmohan Krishna
4. "Yeh Shaam Bhi Kahaan Hui" - Manmohan Krishna
