= Sneham (1977 film) =

- Film poster
- Directed by: A. Bhimsingh
- Written by: Sreekumaran Thampi
- Screenplay by: Sreekumaran Thampi
- Produced by: K. N. S. Jaffarsha
- Starring: Sukumari; Adoor Bhasi; Mallika Sukumaran; Master Rajkrishna
- Edited by: G. Murali
- Music by: Jaya Vijaya
- Production company: JS Films
- Distributed by: JS Films
- Release date: 14 September 1977
- Country: India
- Languages: Telugu; Malayalam

Sneham is a 1977 Indian Telugu-Malayalam bilingual film, directed by A. Bhimsingh and produced by K. N. S. Jaffarsha. The film stars Sukumari, Adoor Bhasi, Mallika Sukumaran and Master Rajkrishna in the lead roles. The film has musical score by Jaya Vijaya. The film is a remake of Hindi film Dosti (1964).

== Cast ==
- Master Sai Kumar
- Master Raja Krishna as Krishna
- Rajendra Prasad as Chandram
- Rao Gopal Rao
- Allu Ramalingaiah
- Mukkamala
- Madhavi
- Halam
- Jhansi
- Baby Varalakshmi
- Sukumari
- Adoor Bhasi
- Mallika Sukumaran
- Master Sridhar
- Nellikode Bhaskaran
- Vidhubala

== Soundtrack ==
The music was composed by Jaya Vijaya and the lyrics were written by Sreekumaran Thampi.

No.	Song	Singers	Lyrics	Length (m:ss)
1	"Eenam Paadithalarnnallo"	Jolly Abraham	Sreekumaran Thampi	
2	"Kaliyum Chiriyum"	K. J. Yesudas	Sreekumaran Thampi	
3	"Pakalkkili"	K. J. Yesudas	Sreekumaran Thampi	
4	"Sandhyayinnum Pulariye Thedi"	K. J. Yesudas	Sreekumaran Thampi	
5	"Swarnam Paakiya"	K. J. Yesudas	Sreekumaran Thampi	
