= Chithramela =

- Directed by: T. S. Muthaiah
- Written by: M. K. Mani; S. L. Puram Sadanandan; T. E. Vasudevan; Sreekumaran Thampi
- Produced by: T. S. Muthaiah
- Starring: Prem Nazir; Sharada; Sheela; K. P. Ummer; Kottayam Chellappan; S. P. Pillai; Adoor Bhasi; Bahadoor; Manavalan Joseph
- Cinematography: N. S. Mani
- Edited by: G. Venkitaraman
- Music by: G. Devarajan
- Production company: Sree Movies
- Distributed by: Central Pictures
- Release date: 29 September 1967
- Country: India
- Language: Malayalam

Chithramela (transl. A Carnival of Pictures) is a 1967 Indian Malayalam-language anthology film directed and produced by T. S. Muthaiah. It was Malayalam cinema's first anthology film. The cast includes Prem Nazir, Sharada, Sheela, K. P. Ummer, Kottayam Chellappan, S. P. Pillai, Adoor Bhasi, Bahadoor and Manavalan Joseph.

== List of short films ==
Short film	Genre	Writer	Actors
Nagarathinte Mukhangal	Crime thriller	Screenplay: M. K. Mani; Dialogues: S. L. Puram Sadanandan	Sheela, K. P. Ummer, Kottayam Chellappan, Baby Rajani, Baby Usha
Penninte Prapancham	Comedy	Idea: T. E. Vasudevan; Dialogues: >Sreekumaran Thampi (Under the name Bhavanikkutty)	S. P. Pillai, Adoor Bhasi, Bahadoor, Manavalan Joseph, Sreenarayana Pillai, Kaduvakulam Antony, J. A. R. Anand, Meenakumari, Khadeeja, C. R. Lakshmi, Devichandrika, Abhayam
Apaswarangal	Romance; Musical; Tragedy	Sreekumaran Thampi	Prem Nazir, Sharada, Thikkurissy Sukumaran Nair, Sukumari, G. K. Pillai, Nellikkodu Bhaskaran, T. R. Omana, Master Sridhar, Vahab Kashmiri, Rajeswari, Kuttan Pillai, Prathapachandran

== Cast ==
- Prem Nazir
- Sheela
- Sharada
- Sukumari
- Adoor Bhasi
- Thikkurissy Sukumaran Nair
- Manavalan Joseph
- T. R. Omana
- Baby
- Prathapachandran
- Abhayam
- Baby Rajani
- Bahadoor
- C. R. Lakshmi
- Devi Chandrika
- G. K. Pillai
- J. A. R. Anand
- K. P. Ummer
- Kaduvakulam Antony
- Kashmiri
- Khadeeja
- Kottayam Chellappan
- Kuttan Pillai
- Master Sridhar
- Meena
- Nellikode Bhaskaran
- Rajeshwari
- S. P. Pillai
- Usha
- Wahab

== Production ==
Veteran actor T. S. Muthiah made his directorial debut with Chithramela. He also produced the film under the banner of Sree Movies. Director M. Krishnan Nair is credited for giving technical assistance in direction. The idea for the short film Penninte Prapancham was by film producer T. E. Vasudevan. He, in turn, was inspired by a Laurel and Hardy film.

Chithramela was the first anthology film (portmanteau film) in Malayalam. The Tamil film Sirikkathe (1939) was the first anthology film in India. The Malayalam film industry has produced only a handful of anthology films to date, which include Yauvanam/Vandikkari (1974), Naalu Pennungal (2007), Kerala Cafe (2009) and Oru Yathrayil (2013), among others. However, since the advent of new-wave Malayalam cinema of the 2010s, many films which used hyperlink format for storytelling came out. Some film pundits consider these films also as portmanteau films.

=== Soundtrack ===
The film's music was provided by G. Devarajan, assisted by R. K. Shekhar. There are eight songs in the film, all of them included in the third and longest segment Apaswarangal. The lyrics were penned by Sreekumaran Thampi, who also penned the script for Apaswarangal.

No.	Song	Singers	Lyrics	Length (m:ss)
1	"Aakaashadeepame"	K. J. Yesudas	Sreekumaran Thampi	
2	"Apaswarangal"	K. J. Yesudas	Sreekumaran Thampi	
3	"Chellacherukiliye"	K. J. Yesudas	Sreekumaran Thampi	
4	"Kannuneer Kaayalile"	K. J. Yesudas	Sreekumaran Thampi	
5	"Madam Pottichirikkunna"	K. J. Yesudas, S. Janaki	Sreekumaran Thampi	
6	"Neeyevide Nin Nizhalevide"	K. J. Yesudas	Sreekumaran Thampi	
7	"Neeyoru Minnalaay"	K. J. Yesudas	Sreekumaran Thampi	
8	"Paaduvaan Moham"	K. J. Yesudas	Sreekumaran Thampi	
