= Jothi Agaval =

Jothi Agaval ('The Divine Call') is a 1,596-line Tamil spiritual poem by Ramalinga Swamigal (commonly known as Vallalar).

The song was originally composed in April 18, 1872, on the Tamil month of Chitirai, Aangirasa year. Vallalar is thought to have written it in Mettukuppam Siddhi Valaagam, near Vadalur, Tamil Nadu, then part of the British empire. It is part of the Sixth Thirumurai (classical Tamil sextet) in Thiruarutpa.

According to oral history, Vallalar is thought to have created this poem in just the course of one night. The poetic meter & rhythm are set in classical Tamil Isai at Asiriyappaa.

== Inspiration and philosophy ==
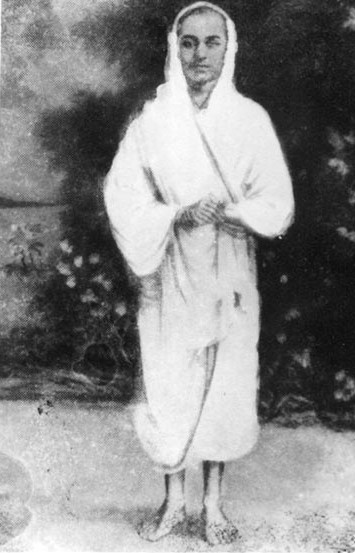
retouched portrait of Vallalar originally painted by Chengalvarayan in Vettavalam

In 1864, Vallalar was called to Vettavalam to cure the Zamindar's wife's illnesses, there, upon his visit since the wife's instantly got cured from the illness, Vallalar was confirmed in his spiritual powers. After which, the Zamin declared no animal shall remain slain within his realm, this garnered much adoration & respect from others for Vallalar's ideals of Jeeva Karunyam "empathy for all living". This also created much news, Vallalar was called again in 1870 to treat an incurable disease of the dubash, Raja Ramanuja Pillai, which he upon just touching his forehead was told to have cured.

His spiritual affinity was cemented when apparently he passed away in a ray of light. Just couple months after composing this final poetic work, the Jothi Agaval.
