= Chennai Fort railway station =

Railway station in Chennai, India

Chennai Fort Chennai Kottai
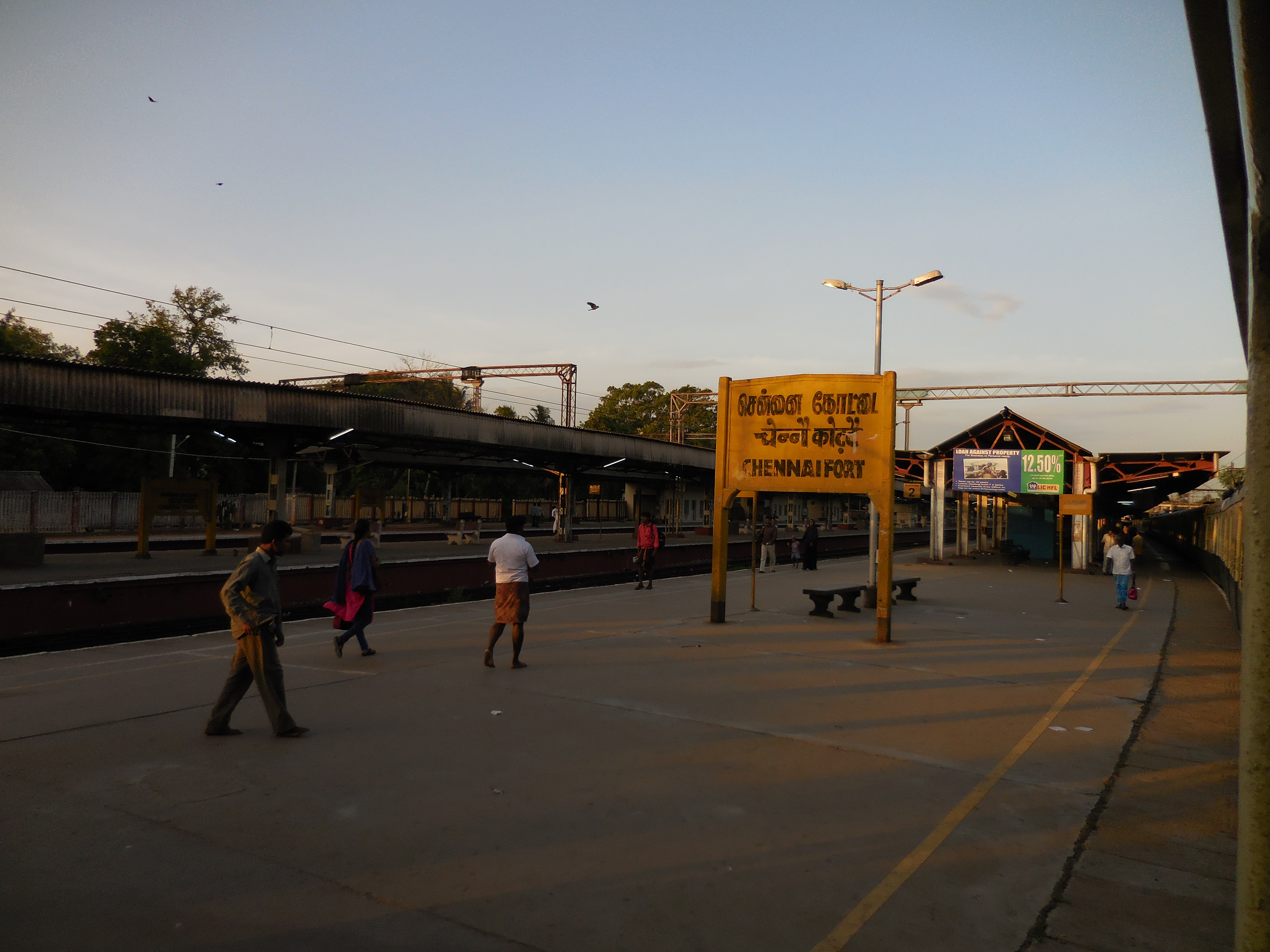
- Chennai Fort station at dawn

General information
- Location: Fort St George, Chennai, Tamil Nadu 600003
- Coordinates: 13°04′59″N 80°16′57″E
- System: Chennai Suburban Railway; Chennai MRTS
- Owner: Southern Railways
- Platforms: 5 (2 platforms for MRTS)
- Tracks: 5

Construction
- Structure type: At Grade
- Platform levels: 1
- Parking: Available

Other information
- Station code: MSF

History
- Opened: 1931 (Suburban line); 1 November 1995 (MRTS line)
- Electrified: Single phase 25 kV, 50 Hz AC through overhead catenary

Passengers
- 22,000/day

Services
Preceding station	Chennai MRTS	Following station
Chennai Beach Terminus	Line 1	Chennai Park Town towards St. Thomas Mount
Preceding station	Chennai Suburban	Following station
Chennai Beach Terminus	South Line	Chennai Park towards Tambaram, Chengalpattu Junction or Villupuram Junction
Location

Chennai Fort (formerly known as Madras Fort) (station code: MSF) is a station on the Chennai Suburban Railway and Chennai MRTS. It is the second station on the Chennai MRTS line from Chennai Beach to Velachery.

== History ==
The station is named after Fort St. George, which it serves. Madras Dental College is located opposite the station, adjoining Madras Medical College Men's Hotel and Nursing College. The Madras Medical College is a few hundred metres away. The station consists of 260 sq m of open parking area.

== The station ==
=== Platforms ===
There are a total of 5 platforms and 5 tracks. The platforms are connected by foot overbridge. These platforms are built to accumulate 24 coaches express train. The platforms are equipped with modern facility like display board of arrival and departure of trains.

=== Station layout ===
G	Street level	Exit/Entrance, FOB & ticket counter
P	Platform 1	Towards → Chennai Beach
P	FOB, Island platform | P1 Doors will open on the right | P2 Doors will open on the right (Platform Numbers 1 and 2 run by South Line under Chennai Suburban Railway)
P	Platform 2	Towards ← Tambaram / Chengalpattu Jn / Villuppuram Jn; Next Station: Chennai Park
P	Platform 3	(Platform Number 3 Not in Operation)
P	FOB, Island platform | P3 (Not in operation) | P4 Doors will open on the left (Platform Numbers 4 and 5 run by Chennai MRTS)
P	Platform 4	Towards → Chennai Beach
P	Platform 5	Towards ← St. Thomas Mount; Next Station: Chennai Park Town
P	FOB, Side platform | P5 Doors will open on the left
P

== Gallery ==
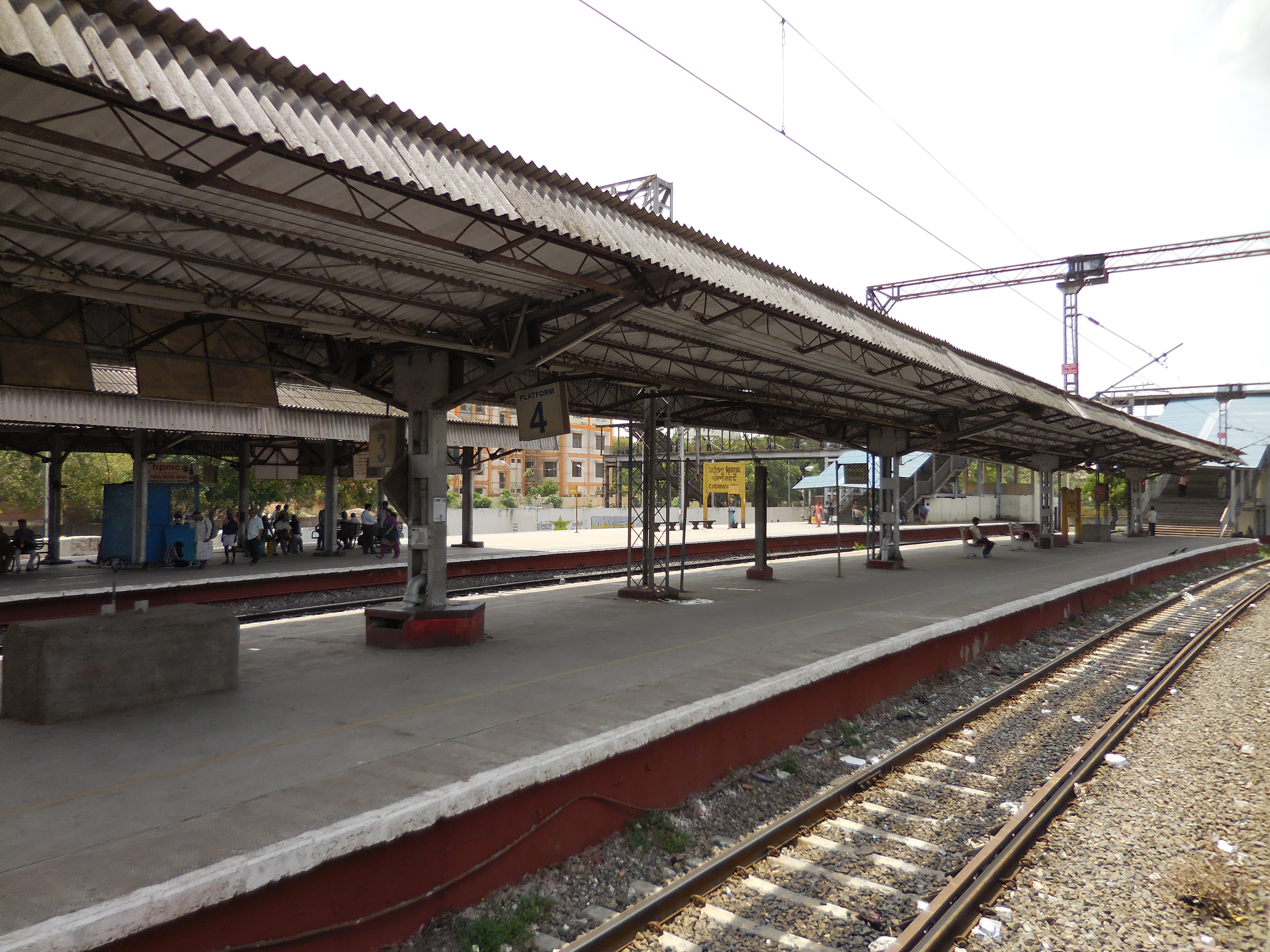
Eastern view of the MRTS platform at the station

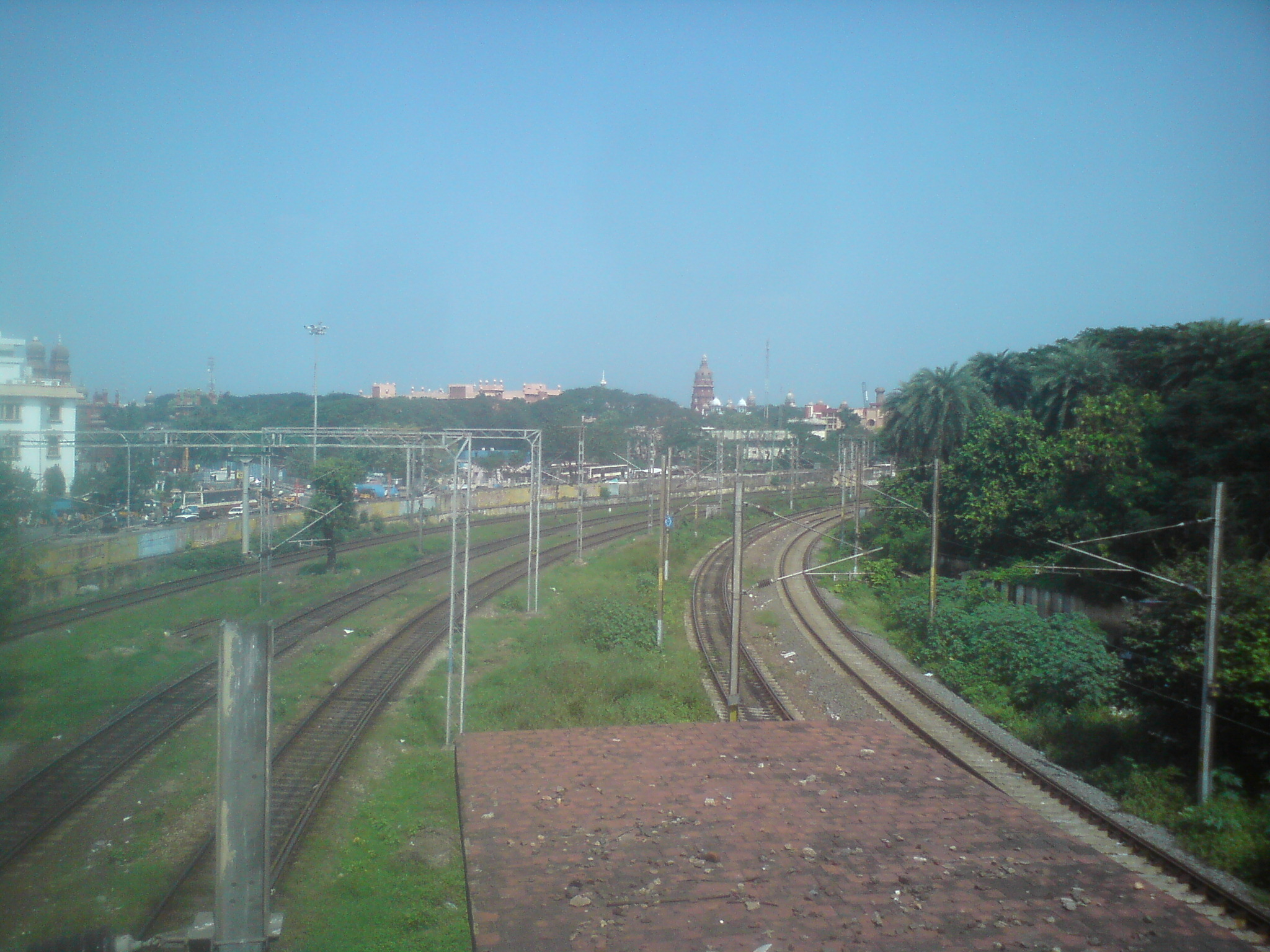
Tracks heading towards Chennai Beach as seen from the footbridge at Fort station. The 3 tracks on the left are usually used by Beach–Tambaram/Chengalpet/Tirumalpur suburban trains and Express trains. The 2 tracks on the right are usually used by MRTS trains that ply between Chennai Beach and Velachery

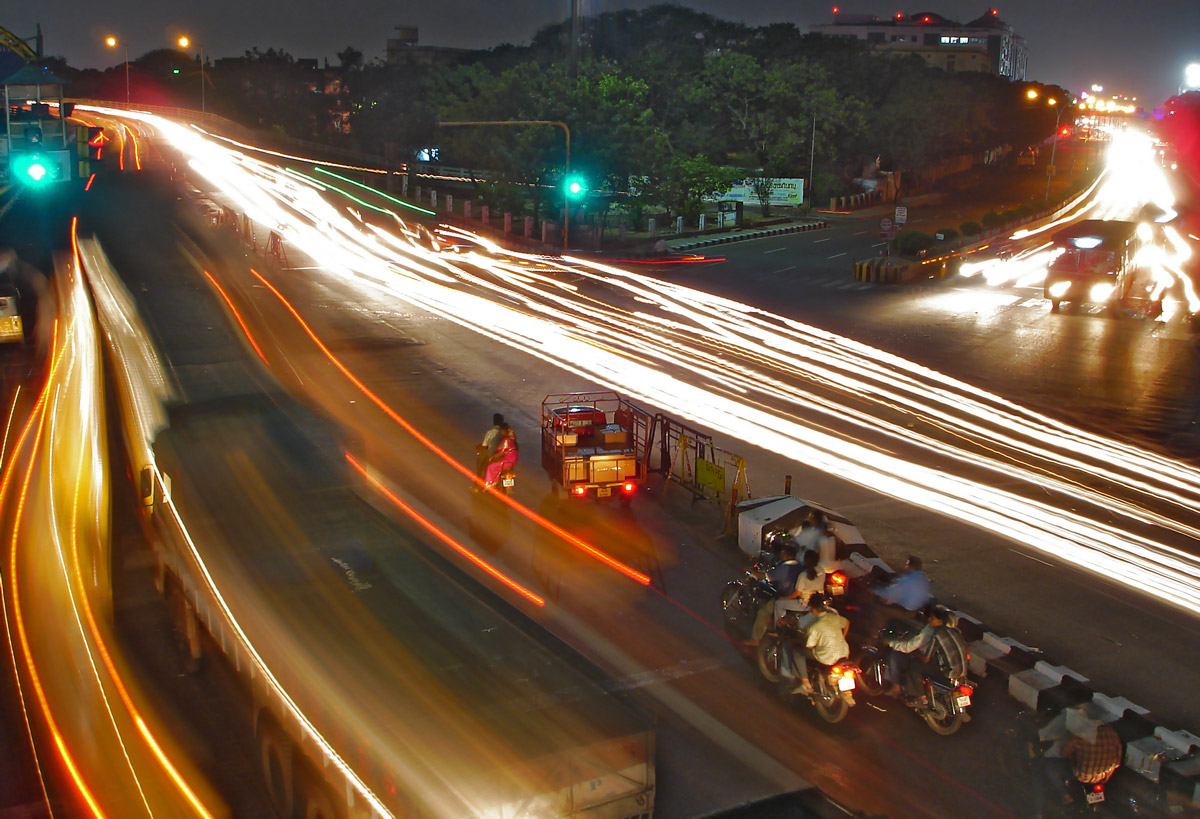
EVR Periyar Salai, an arterial road, begins near Fort station

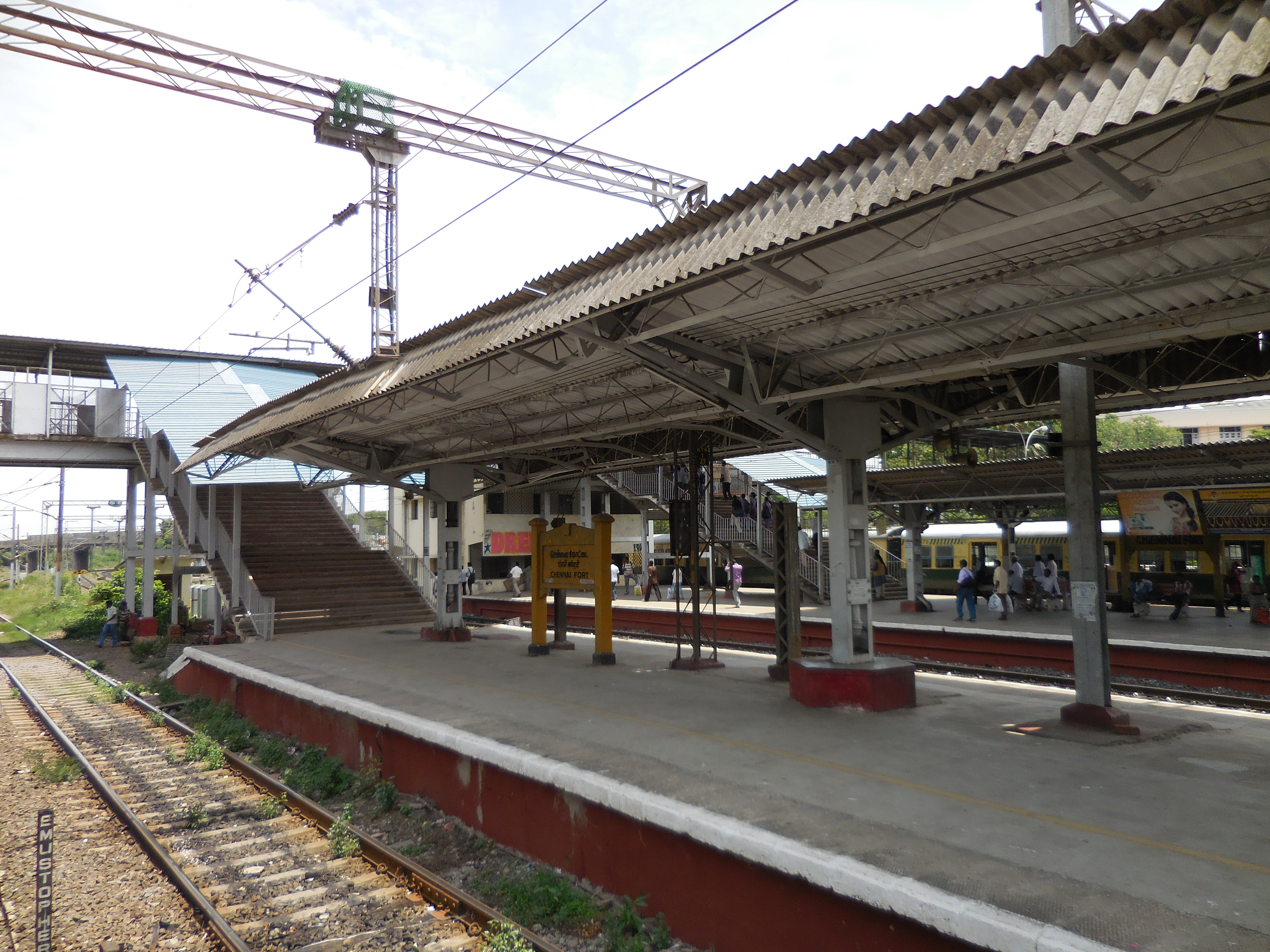
A view of the MRTS platform and the footbridge at the Fort railway station

== See also ==
- Chennai Metro
- Chennai Suburban Railway
- Railway stations in Chennai
