= 11th National Film Awards =

Indian ceremony celebrating cinema of 1963

- Awarded for: Best of Indian cinema in 1963
- Awarded by: Ministry of Information and Broadcasting
- Presented by: Sarvepalli Radhakrishnan (President of India)
- Presented on: 25 April 1964
- Site: Vigyan Bhavan, New Delhi
- Official website: dff.nic.in
- Best Feature Film: Shehar Aur Sapna

The 11th National Film Awards, then known as State Awards for Films, presented by Ministry of Information and Broadcasting, India to felicitate the best of Indian Cinema released in 1963. Ceremony took place at Vigyan Bhavan, New Delhi on 25 April 1964 and awards were given by then President of India, Dr. Sarvepalli Radhakrishnan.

Starting with 11th National Film Awards, new category of awards for Filmstrips, in the non-feature films section, was introduced. This category includes Prime Minister's gold medal and Certificate of Merit for second and third best educational film. Though gold medal for this category was not given. This award is discontinued over the years.

== Awards ==
Awards were divided into feature films and non-feature films.

President's gold medal for the All India Best Feature Film is now better known as National Film Award for Best Feature Film, whereas President's gold medal for the Best Documentary Film is analogous to today's National Film Award for Best Non-Feature Film. For children's films, Prime Minister's gold medal is now given as National Film Award for Best Children's Film. At the regional level, President's silver medal for Best Feature Film is now given as National Film Award for Best Feature Film in a particular language. Certificate of Merit in all the categories is discontinued over the years.

=== Feature films ===
Feature films were awarded at All India as well as regional level. For the 11th National Film Awards, a Hindi film Shehar Aur Sapna won the President's gold medal for the All India Best Feature Film. Following were the awards given:

==== All India Award ====
For 11th National Film Awards, none of the films were awarded from Children's Films category as no film was found to be suitable. Only Certificate of Merit for Children's films was given. Following were the awards given in each category:

Award	Film	Language	Awardee(s)	Cash prize
President's gold medal for the All India Best Feature Film	Shehar Aur Sapna	Hindi	Producer: Naya Sansar	Gold Medal and ₹20,000
President's gold medal for the All India Best Feature Film	Shehar Aur Sapna	Hindi	Director: Khwaja Ahmad Abbas	₹5,000
All India Certificate of Merit for the Second Best Feature Film	Nartanasala	Telugu	Producer: Sridhar Rao	Certificate of Merit and ₹10,000
All India Certificate of Merit for the Second Best Feature Film	Nartanasala	Telugu	Producer: C. Lakshmi Rajyam	Certificate of Merit and ₹10,000
All India Certificate of Merit for the Second Best Feature Film	Nartanasala	Telugu	Director: K. Kameshwara Rao	₹2,500
All India Certificate of Merit for the Third Best Feature Film	Mahanagar	Bengali	Producer: R. D. Bansal; Director: Satyajit Ray	Certificate of Merit only
All India Certificate of Merit for Best Children's Film	Panch Puthliyan	Hindi	Producer: Children's Film Society; Director: Amit Bose	Certificate of Merit only

==== Regional Award ====
The awards were given to the best films made in the regional languages of India. For feature films in Gujarati, President's silver medal for Best Feature Film was not given, instead Certificate of Merit for Best Feature Film was awarded; whereas no award was given in Punjabi language.

Award	Film	Awardee(s)	
Award	Film	Producer	Director
Feature Films in Assamese
President's silver medal for Best Feature Film	Maniram Devan	Apurba Chowdhury	S. Chakravarty
Feature Films in Bengali
President's silver medal for Best Feature Film	Uttar Falguni	Uttam Kumar	Asit Sen
Certificate of Merit for the Second Best Feature Film	Saat Paake Bandha	R. D. Bansal	Ajoy Kar
Certificate of Merit for the Third Best Feature Film	Jatu Griha	Uttam Kumar	Tapan Sinha
Feature Films in Gujarati
Certificate of Merit for Best Feature Film	Jevi Chhun Tevi	Bholanath D. Trivedi	Gajanan Mehta
Feature Films in Hindi
President's silver medal for Best Feature Film	Bandini	Bimal Roy Productions	Bimal Roy
Certificate of Merit for the Second Best Feature Film	Mere Mehboob	Harnam Singh Rawail	H. S. Rawail
Certificate of Merit for the Third Best Feature Film	Gumrah	B. R. Films	B. R. Chopra
Feature Films in Kannada
President's silver medal for Best Feature Film	Santha Thukaram	B. Radhakrishna	Sundar Rao Nadkarni
Certificate of Merit for the Second Best Feature Film	Mangala Muhurta	U. Subba Rao	M. R. Vittal
Feature Films in Malayalam
President's silver medal for Best Feature Film	Ninamaninja Kalpadukal	K. V. Bhavadas	N. N. Pisharody
President's silver medal for Best Feature Film	Ninamaninja Kalpadukal	N. K. Karunakara Pillai	N. N. Pisharody
President's silver medal for Best Feature Film	Ninamaninja Kalpadukal	K. Parameshwaran Nair	N. N. Pisharody
Certificate of Merit for the Second Best Feature Film	Doctor	H. H. Ebrahim	M. S. Mani
Certificate of Merit for the Third Best Feature Film	Kalayum Kaminiyum	Neela Productions	P. Subramaniam
Feature Films in Marathi
President's silver medal for Best Feature Film	Ha Majha Marg Ekla	Sudhir Phadke	Raja Paranjape
Certificate of Merit for the Second Best Feature Film	Te Majhe Ghar	Ravindra Bhat	Ganesh Bhat
Feature Films in Odia
President's silver medal for Best Feature Film	Jeevan Sathi	Srinibash Paikaroy	Prabhat Mukherjee
Certificate of Merit for the Second Best Feature Film	Nari	Narendra Kumar Mitra	Trilochana (Note: Trilochana consists of Narendra Kumar Mitra, Amalendu Bagehi, Kavichandra Kalicharan Patnaik)
Feature Films in Tamil
President's silver medal for Best Feature Film	Naanum Oru Penn	Murugan Brothers	A. C. Tirulokchandar
Certificate of Merit for the Second Best Feature Film	Karpagam	K. S. Sabarinathan	K. S. Gopalakrishnan
Certificate of Merit for the Third Best Feature Film	Karnan	B. R. Panthulu	B. R. Panthulu
Feature Films in Telugu
President's silver medal for Best Feature Film	Lava Kusa	Lalita Sivajyoti Films	C. Pullaiah
President's silver medal for Best Feature Film	Lava Kusa	Lalita Sivajyoti Films	C. S. Rao
Certificate of Merit for the Second Best Feature Film	Amar Silpi Jakkanna	B. S. Ranga	B. S. Ranga
Certificate of Merit for the Third Best Feature Film	Mooga Manasulu	C. Sundaram	Adurthi Subba Rao

=== Non-Feature films ===
Non-feature film awards were given for the documentaries, educational films and film strips made in the country. Following were the awards given:

==== Documentaries ====
Award	Film	Language	Awardee(s)	Cash prize
President's gold medal for the Best Documentary Film	Song of the Snow	English	Producer: Films Division	Gold Medal and ₹4,000
President's gold medal for the Best Documentary Film	Song of the Snow	English	Director: N. S. Thapa	₹1,000
All India Certificate of Merit for the Second Best Documentary Film	Malwa	English	Producer: Films Division	Certificate of Merit and ₹2,000
All India Certificate of Merit for the Second Best Documentary Film	Malwa	English	Director: S. N. S. Sastry	₹500
All India Certificate of Merit for the Third Best Documentary Film	Jain Temples of India	English	Producer: Films Division	Certificate of Merit only
All India Certificate of Merit for the Third Best Documentary Film	Jain Temples of India	English	Director: Arun Chaudhari	Certificate of Merit only

==== Educational films ====
Award	Film	Language	Awardee(s)	Cash prize
All India Certificate of Merit for the Best Educational Film	Indian Ocean Expedition	Hindi	Producer: Children's Film Society	Certificate of Merit only
All India Certificate of Merit for the Best Educational Film	Indian Ocean Expedition	Hindi	Director: Shanti S. Verma	Certificate of Merit only

==== Filmstrip ====
Award	Film	Language	Awardee(s)	Cash prize
All India Certificate of Merit for the Best Filmstrip	Historical Monuments of Delhi	Hindi	Director: G. K. Athalye	Certificate of Merit only
All India Certificate of Merit for the Best Filmstrip	Historical Monuments of Delhi	Hindi	Director: G. K. Athalye	Certificate of Merit only

=== Awards not given ===
Following were the awards not given as no film was found to be suitable for the award:

- Prime Minister's gold medal for the Best Children's Film
- Prime Minister's gold medal for the Best Educational Film
- Prime Minister's gold medal for the Best Filmstrip
- President's silver medal for Best Feature Film in Punjabi
