= Chahunga Main Tujhe =

1964 Hindi song by Mohammed Rafi

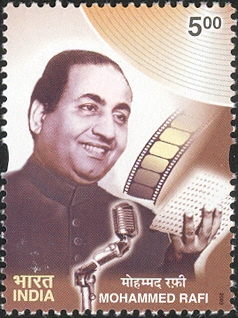

Song by Mohammed Rafi
- Language: Hindi
- Released: 1964
- Composer: Laxmikant–Pyarelal
- Lyricist: Majrooh Sultanpuri

"Chahunga Main Tujhe" is an Indian Hindi song from the Bollywood film Dosti (1964). The lyrics of the song were written by Majrooh Sultanpuri, and the music was composed by Laxmikant–Pyarelal. Mohammed Rafi was the playback singer of this song. In 1965 Majrooh Sultanpuri received Filmfare award in the best lyrics category for this song. Laxmikant–Pyarelal won their first Filmfare award for composing this song.

Although the song became very popular and got Filmfare awards, the song was planned to be removed from the film. Mohammed Rafi insisted to keep the song in the film. He took only ₹1 as his fee as the singer.

== Awards ==
For this song both the lyricist Majrooh Sultanpuri and the music composer-duo Laxmikant–Pyarelal received Filmfare Awards in the categories of best lyrics, and best music composition respectively.
