= Jothi (1939 film) =

- Film Poster
- ஜோதி
- Directed by: T. R. Raghunath
- Written by: C. A. Lakshmanadas
- Screenplay by: Pammal Sambandha Mudaliar
- Story by: Pammal Sambandha Mudaliar
- Based on: The life of Vadalur Ramalinga Vallalar
- Starring: K. A. Muthu Bhagavathar; P. G. Venkatesan; V. B. Ramaiah; M. G. Chakrapani; Miss. Madurai A. Sundaram; Saravanabhavanandar; N. S. Krishnan; T. A. Mathuram
- Cinematography: A. Kapoor
- Music by: Madurai Mariappa Swamigal
- Production company: Jothi Pictures
- Release date: 16 March 1939 (India)
- Country: India
- Language: Tamil

Jothi (alternatively titled Sri Jyothi Ramalinga Swamigal) is a 1939 Indian Tamil language film directed by T. R. Raghunath. It is the life story of Saint Ramalinga Swamigal popularly known as Vallalar. No print of the film is known to survive, making it a lost film.

== Cast ==
K. A. Muthu Bhagavathar as Ramalinga Swamigal
P. G. Venkatesan
V. B. Ramaiah as Ramalinga Swamigal's father
M. G. Chakrapani
T. V. Janakam
K. S. Sankara Iyer
K. S. Velayudham
Miss. Madurai A. Sundaram as Ramalinga Swamigal's mother
Saravanabhavanandar
N. S. Krishnan
T. A. Mathuram
P. S. Krishnaveni
M. R. Swaminathan
K. K. Soundar
B. Gopal
M. R. Subramaniam
V. Nataraj
‘Master’ Ramudu as Child Ramalinga Swamigal
‘Master’ Mahadevan as teenager Ramalinga Swamigal
Rajammal
T. M. Pattammal
M. S. Kannammal
H. S. Tawkar
S. R. Sami
Ramalakshmi
‘Master’ Muthu

== Crew ==
- Director: T. R. Raghunath
- Screenplay: Pammal Sambandha Mudaliar
- Dialogues: C. A. Lakshmanadas
- Cinematography: A. Kapoor
- Audiography: V. B. Dathe
- Studio: Bharath Lakshmi Pictures Studio (Calcutta)

== Soundtrack ==
Madurai Mariappa Swamigal scored the music and wrote the lyrics. This is the first film where he worked as music director. Singers are: P. G. Venkatesan, Muthuswamy, N. S. Krishnan and T. A. Mathuram.

== See also ==
- Arutperunjothi 1971 film
