= Chennai Park Town railway station =

Railway station in Chennai, India

Park Town
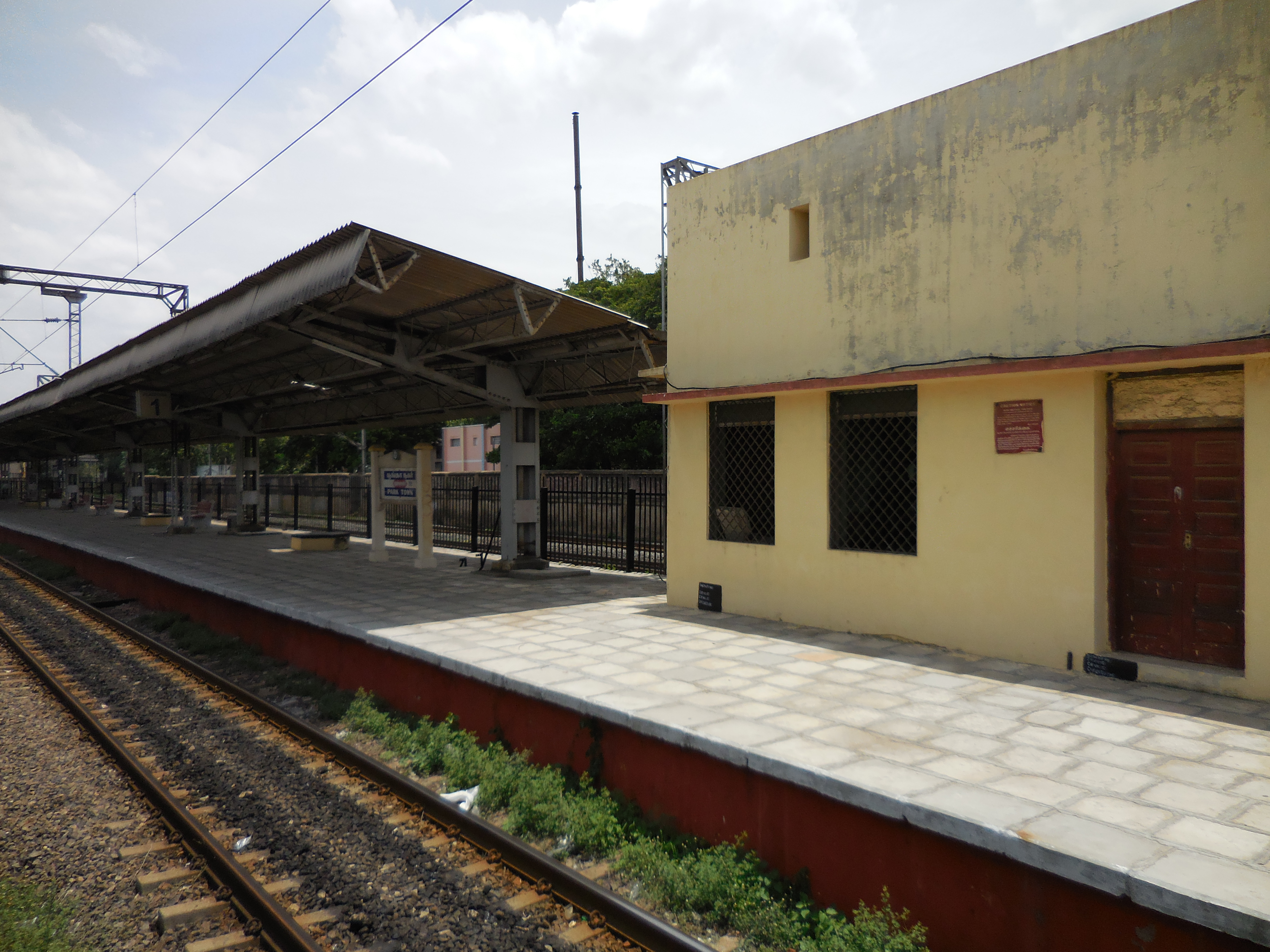
- Chennai Park Town MRTS station

General information
- Coordinates: 13°04′46″N 80°16′35″E
- System: Chennai MRTS
- Platforms: Island Platform; Platform-1 → St. Thomas Mount; Platform-2 → Chennai Beach
- Tracks: 2

Construction
- Structure type: At Grade

Other information
- Status: Active
- Station code: MPKT

History
- Opened: 1 November 1995

Passengers
- 30,000/day

Services
Preceding station	Chennai MRTS	Following station
Chennai Fort towards Chennai Beach	Line 1	Chintadripet towards St. Thomas Mount
Location

Chennai Park Town, or just Park Town, is a railway station on the Chennai MRTS. Located just to the east of Pallavan Salai and to the south of the Rajiv Gandhi Government General Hospital in the Park Town neighbourhood of Chennai, it exclusively serves the Chennai MRTS. The station is adjacent to Chennai Park, which serves the Chennai Suburban Railway. It is also within walking distance to Chennai Central. Although within walking distance, a 1 km overhead pedestrian walkway is being planned to connect Chennai Central with the MRTS station.

== History ==
The Chennai Park Town station opened on 1 November 1995, as part of the first phase of the Chennai MRTS network.

== Structure ==
The stations is currently located at ground level, although the MRTS route begins its ascent to an elevated viaduct for much of its route. This MRTS station has one level - platform with concourse and street level.

G	Street level & Mezzanine	Exit/Entrance, Station ticket counters and Automatic ticket vending machines
P	Side platform | Doors will open on the left
P	Platform 2 Eastbound	Towards → Chennai Beach; Next Station: Chennai Fort
P	Platform 1 Westbound	Towards ← St. Thomas Mount; Next Station: Chintadripet
P	Side platform | Doors will open on the left
P

== Service and connections ==
Chennai Park Town station is currently the third station on the MRTS line to St. Thomas Mount. From St. Thomas Mount, it is eighteenth station towards Chennai Beach station.

The station is adjacent to the Chennai Park station, which services multiple Chennai Suburban Railway lines. Additionally, it is connected to Chennai Central and to the Chennai Central metro station.

As of 2012, the station handles about 30,000 passengers a day. As of late 2023, the station is being revamped as the laying of new fourth line works between Egmore and Beach station is undergoing.

== Gallery ==
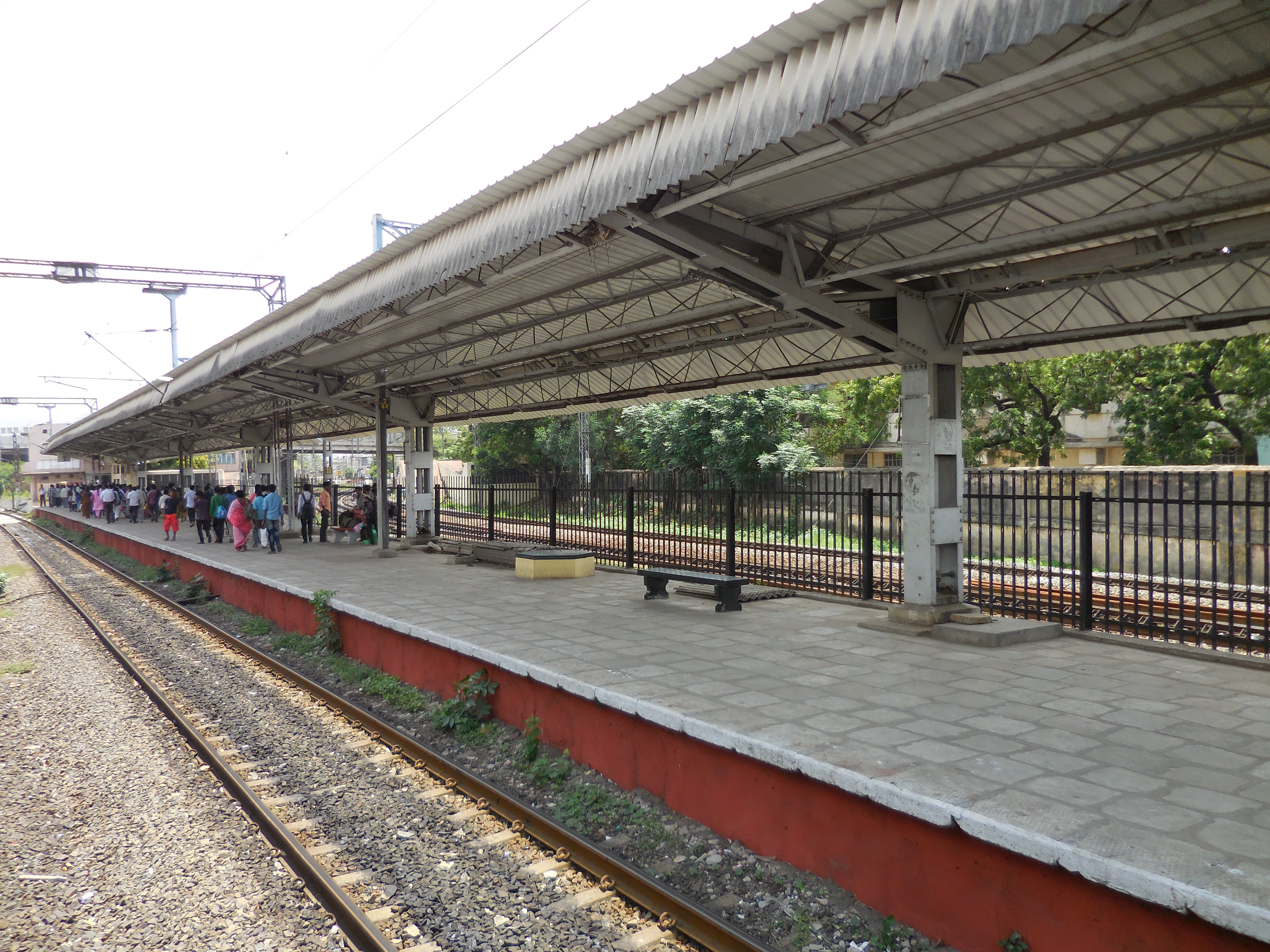
Western view of the station

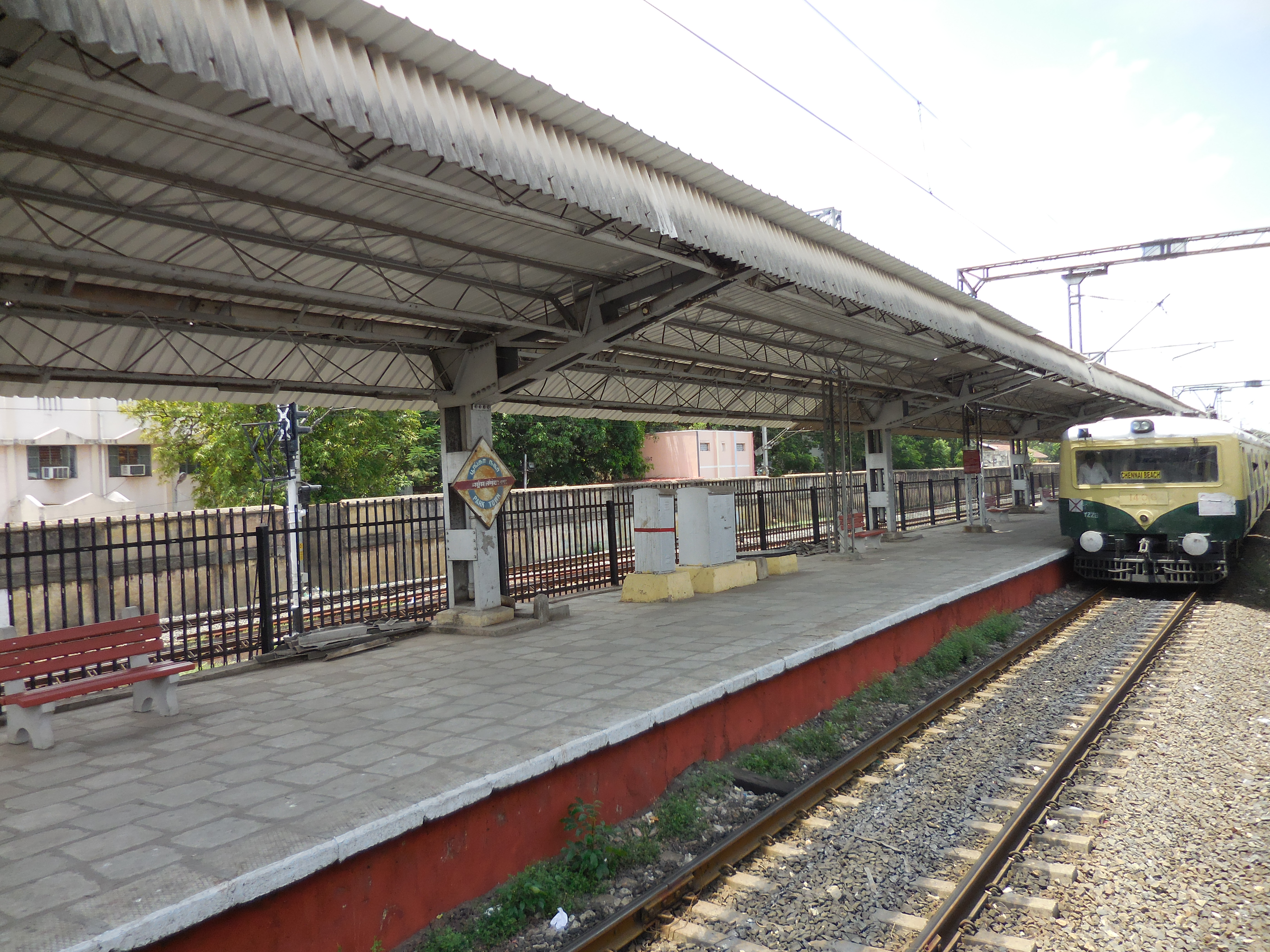
An MRTS train leaving the station for Chennai Fort station

== See also ==
- Chennai MRTS
- Chennai suburban railway
- Chennai Metro
- Transport in Chennai
