= Raja Ramanuja Muni Pillai =

His Highness Meharban Sriman Ramanuja Muni Pillai
- Raja Karamvant Bahádur
- Coat of arms: The family cognisance is the disc or quoit of Vishnu.
- Tenure: 1890-1938
- Predecessor: Raja Karamvant Indir Bahádur Srinivasa Pillai
- Successor: Kunwar, Srinivasa Pillai
- Other titles: Prince
- Born: 13 December 1840
- Died: 1938 (aged 97–98)
- Noble family: Pillai-Pāri family

Sriman Ramanuja Muni Pillai, Bahádur, Rájá Karamvant, (13 December 1840 - 1938) was a Tamil noble, Philanthropist and courtier of the Nawab of the Carnatic, Ghulam Muhammad Ghouse Khan. He was a member of the cadet branch of the Pillai-Pāri family.

== Early life & family ==
Sriman Ramanuja Muni Pillai, was born on the 13th of December 1840. His father was Raja Karanwant Indir Bahadur C.Srinivasa Pillai, a coutier for the Nawab of Carnatic and Prince of the Pillai-Pāri family, his mother was Raniammal. His paternal grandfather was C.Munniya Pillai, an aristocrat and Dubash, one of his paternal ancestors was the Polygar Seshadri Pillai.

He was the only son of Raja Karanwant Indir Bahadur Srinivasa Pillai, also known as C.Srinivasa Pillai, or Komaleeswaran Kovil Srinivasa Pillai. His cousin was the Zamindar of Nungambakkam Mitta Alimuthu Pillai. He adopted a son, Kunwar Srinivasa Pillai. His father was a Dubash and first president and trustee of Pachaiyappa's trust, and the creator of Pachaiyappa's hall in George Town, Madras, Srinivasa Pillai also served as a courtier of the Nawab of Carnatic, and was awarded the title Raja Karanwant Indir Bahadur in 1851.

== Career ==
Sriman Ramanujan, who at the age of fifteen held the hereditary position of a courtier himself under the last Nawab of Carnatic Ghulam Muhammad Ghouse Khan, was awarded the very same title of Raja Karanwant later and it was recognised by the Viceroy Lord Landsdowne. Sriman Ramanujan was often lauded for his loyalty and charity, being a patron of the Komaleeswarar Temple, in Pudupet, Madras.

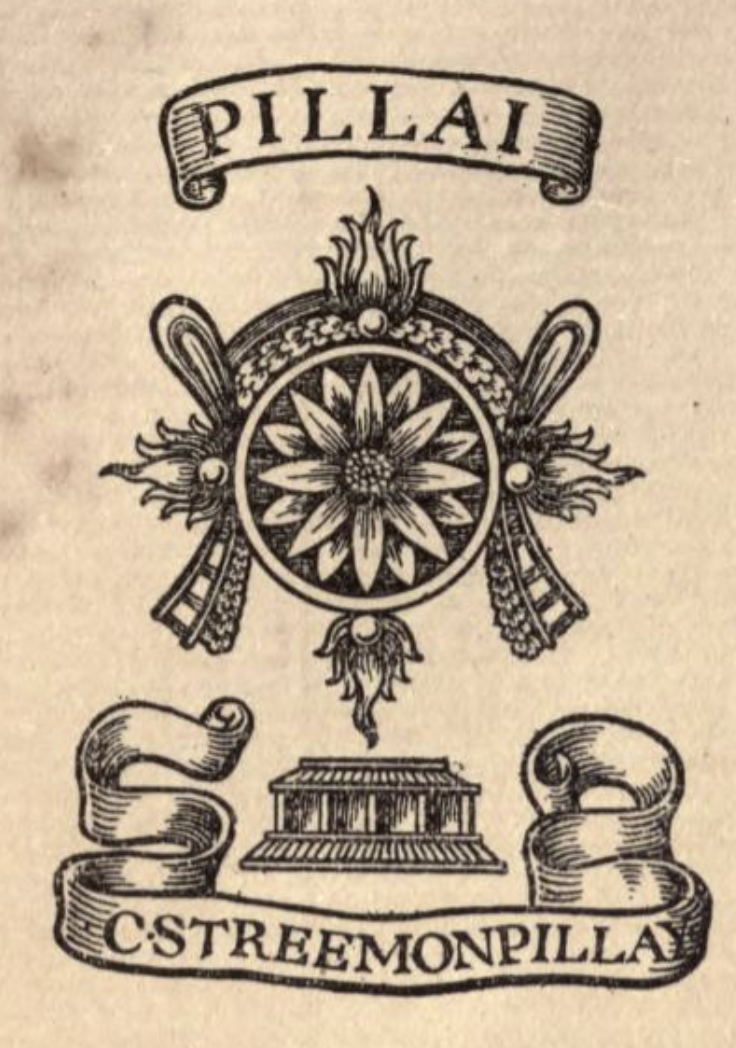
Coat of arms of the Pillai family, cadet branch of the Pāri house.

== Personal life ==
He adopted a son whom he named Srinivasa pillai, who held the courtesy title of Kunwar.

Sriman Ramanuja Muni pillai died in 1938, at the age of 97, in his residence in Komaleeswaranpet (Pudupet) Madras, his funeral was told to have gone on for three full days due to the overflow of visitors and wellwishers who saw him as their benefactor.

His adopted son, Kunwar Srinivasa Pillai, did not acquire the title of Raja Karanwant, as it was held in personal distinction of Sriman Ramanujan, nor did he receive the title of Prince of the Pillai-Pāri family, but was noted as the succssesor to Sriman Ramanuja Muni pillai's estate in Pudupet.
