= May Day Park, Chennai =

Urban park in Chennai, India

May Day Park
- Interactive map of May Day Park
- Type: Urban park
- Location: Chintadripet, Chennai, India
- Coordinates: 13°04′24″N 80°16′16″E
- Area: 14.5 acres (5.9 hectares)
- Created: 13 September 1950
- Operator: Corporation of Chennai
- Status: Open all year

The May Day Park, originally known as Napier Park, is a park in the city of Chennai, India. It is located on Deputy Mayor Kabalamoorthy Road in Chintadripet.

== History ==
On 28 January 1869, a resolution was passed by the Madras municipality proposing the creation of a park at the site of the stables of Messrs. Burghall and Company in Chintadripettah. The proposal was forwarded to the Government of Madras Presidency and on 15 April 1869, the proposal was approved and land was allotted for the construction of the park. The park was named after Francis Napier, 10th Lord Napier, the Governor of Madras at the time of its creation.

== The park ==
The park covers about 14.5 acres (5.9 hectares) and was opened to the public on 13 September 1950 by the then Minister of Agriculture, A. B. Shetty. The park is used to hold public meetings during the May Day celebrations when rallies are conducted from the park. The park is divided into two portions. There are facilities for cricket, football, volleyball and badminton on the eastern and western sides of the park.

The park has been adopted and maintained by Simpson & Co.

== See also ==
- Parks in Chennai
