= Burma Bazaar =

Bazaar in Chennai, India

Coordinates: 13.089772°N 80.290044°E

Burma Bazaar is a market run by Burmese refugees in Chennai, India. It is located at Parrys Corner and is one of the several unorganized or grey market shopping hubs of Chennai. The bazaar was set up in 1969 by the Government of Tamil Nadu. It is located just outside the Chennai Beach railway station, in the old financial district of the city at George Town. It is a row of about 200 shops that line either side of the road for about a kilometre.

== History ==
Burma Bazaar was established by Burmese immigrants, who were Tamil refugees who fled Myanmar during the early 1960s. The government set aside land for the Tamil refugees returning from Burma during the 1960s. The bazaar is run by the Burma Tamizhar Marumalarchi Sangam, an association that has been set up to look after the interests of the traders since 1966.

== The bazaar ==
The bazaar extends to about a kilometre along the Chennai Beach railway station. There are an estimated 200 shops in the bazaar. With several passengers coming out of the station every few minutes, the market appears busy all the time. It is estimated that over 100,000 people pass through this corridor every week.

Per 2017 estimates, there are over 600 shops in the bazaar employing over 5,000 people.

It had been listed as a notorious market between 2009 and 2017 by the USTR for selling various counterfeit goods and pirated media and software.

== In media ==
Ayan, a 2009 Indian film, shows the operations of selling CDs, software, electronics, perfumes, and other goods in great detail. Other Indian films which make references to the market include Vattaram (2006) and Kacheri Arambam (2010).

== See also ==
- Arabber
- Bazaar
- George Town
- Hawker centre (Asia) a centre where street food is sold
- Pan Bazaar
- Peddler
- Retail
- Ritchie Street
- Shopping in Chennai
- Street vendor
- Street food
