= Pudupet =

Pudupet (Chennai) Komaleeswaranpet Pudupet
- Neighbourhood
- Location within Chennai Location within Tamil Nadu Location within India
- Coordinates: 13°04′08.8″N 80°15′15.1″E
- Country: India
- State: Tamil Nadu
- District: Chennai district
- Elevation: 32 m (105 ft)

Languages
  - Official: Tamil language, English language
  - Speech: Tamil language, English language
- Time zone: UTC+5:30 (IST)
- PIN
- Telephone Code: 044xxxxxxxx
- Vehicle registration
- Neighbourhoods: Egmore, Chintadripet, (Thousand Lights, Chennai), Nungambakkam, Park Town, Chennai, Periamet, Purasawalkam
- Corporation: Greater Chennai Corporation
- Zone & Ward
- LS: Chennai Central Lok Sabha constituency
- VS: Egmore Assembly constituency
- MP: Dayanidhi Maran
- MLA: I. Paranthamen
- Website: https://chennaicorporation.gov.in

Pudupet is a neighbourhood located in Chennai district of Tamil Nadu in India. Pudupet is known for its sales of Automobile spare parts and old vehicles and their spares.

== Location ==
Pudupet is located near Egmore, in Chennai at an elevation of 32 m above the mean sea level and with the geographical coordinates of: 13°04'08.8"N, 80°15'51.1"°E (i.e. 13.0691°N, 80.2642°E).

== Transport ==
=== Road transport ===
Pudupet is well connected by roads. Metropolitan Transport Corporation operates a lot of buses via. Pudupet. People from other areas of Chennai and other districts visit Pudupet using the bus services operated through the nearby Anna Salai.

=== Rail transport ===
Chennai Egmore railway station which is very nearer to Pudupet serves it better for the people who come from a long way via. Tambaram. Chennai Central railway station which is about 2 km from Pudupet also helps people coming from far away via. Tiruvallur. Other metro (railway) stations are: LIC metro station, Government Estate metro station, Chintadripet railway station, Thousand Lights metro station, and so on. Egmore metro station serves residents of localities of Pudupet, Periyamet, Vepery and more.

=== Air transport ===
People from other states and districts that are served by airports can reach Pudupet by coming to Chennai International Airport which is 16 km from Pudupet and then by using rail or road transport facilities.

== Police Quarters ==
At the cost of ₹100.3 crore, residential quarters containing 596 houses for policemen attached to Armed Reserve, are constructed in Pudupet.
