= Sant Gyaneshwar =

- Theatrical poster
- Sant Gyaneshwar
- Directed by: Manibhai Vyas
- Produced by: Ranglok
- Starring: Sudhir Kumar; Surekha; Babloo; Shahu Modak
- Music by: Laxmikant-Pyarelal
- Release date: 1964
- Country: India
- Language: Hindi

Sant Gyaneshwar is a 1964 Bollywood film direct by Manibhai Vyas, starring Sudhir Kumar, Surekha, Babloo and Shahu Modak.

== Cast ==
- Sudhir Kumar
- Surekha
- Babloo
- Shahu Modak
- Jeevan
- Ulhas
- Sulochana Latkar
- Asit Sen
- Madan Puri
- Bharat Bhushan

== Soundtrack ==
Sant Gyaneshwar

Soundtrack album by Laxmikant-Pyarelal
- Released: 1964
- Genre: Feature film soundtrack
- Label: EMI
- Producer: Ranglok

Music composed by Laxmikant-Pyarelal and lyrics by Bharat Vyas.

Original Motion Pictures
Track	Song	Singer(s)
1	"Jaago Re Jaago Re Prabhat Aaya"	Manna Dey
2	"Ek Do Teen Char Bhaiya Bano Hoshiyar"	Lata Mangeshkar
3	"Mere Laadlo Tum Phoolo Phalo"	Lata Mangeshkar
4	"Jyot Se Jyot Jagaate Chalo Prem Ki Ganga Bahaate Chalo" (Part 1)	Lata Mangeshkar
5	"Bahut Din Beete"	Lata Mangeshkar
6	"Jyot Se Jyot Jagaate Chalo Prem Ki Ganga Bahaate Chalo" (Part 2)	Mukesh
7	"Main To Chhail Chhabeeli Naar" (Darpan Dekhoon Roop Niharoon)	Lata Mangeshkar
8	"Jai Jai Ram Krishna Hare"	Shyama Hemady, Mukesh

Several songs are set in Hindustani ragas: "Jaago Re Jaago Re Prabhat Aaya" ([[Todi (raga)|Todi]]), "Jyot Se Jyot Jagaate Chalo Prem Ki Ganga Bahaate Chalo" ([[Bhairavi (Hindustani)|Bhairavi]]) and "Bahut Din Beete" (Shivaranjani).

- The song "Jyot Se Jyot Jagaate Chalo Prem Ki Ganga Bahaate Chalo" was listed at #3 on Binaca Geetmala annual list 1965.

== Awards and nominations ==
- Nomination Filmfare Award for Best Lyricist – Bharat Vyas for the song "Jyot Se Jyot Jagaate Chalo Prem Ki Ganga Bahaate Chalo".
- Nomination Filmfare Award for Best Playback Singer – Lata Mangeshkar for the song "Jyot Se Jyot Jagaate Chalo Prem Ki Ganga Bahaate Chalo".
