= Master Sridhar =

Indian actor

- Born: Sridhar; 1953
- Died: 11 December 2013 (aged 60); Chennai, Tamil Nadu, India
- Other names: Master Sreedhar, Master Sreethar
- Occupation: Actor
- Spouse: Baby Indira
- Children: Prashanth; Rakshith Balaji
- Honours: Kalaimamani 2020

Sridhar, known as Master Sridhar was an Indian actor in the Tamil film industry. He acted in about 150 films. He was introduced to Tamil cinema as a child actor.

== Personal life ==
Sridhar married actress Indira (also known as Baby Indira) who was also a famous child artist in 1970s movies. The couple had two sons named Prashanth and Rakshith.

== Film career ==
Beginning his career as a child artist, Sridhar acted in many films, including Kandan Karunai, Karnan and Swamy Ayyappan. He was cast as the hero in K.S. Gopalakrishnan's Kurathi Magan, starring Gemini Ganesan and K.R. Vijaya. He was known for his performance as Muruga, a Hindu god, in the mythological movie Kandan Karunai.

Adi Parasakthi (Raj TV), Gnyaanaanandham (Podhigai) and Indrajith (Jaya TV) were some of the serials he was featured in.

His last film in Tamil was Bhagavan Ayyappan, released in 2007.

== Partial filmography ==
Year	Film	Role	Language	Notes
1966	Marakka Mudiyumaa?		Tamil	
1967	Sri Purandara Dasaru		Kannada	
1964	Karnan	Meghanathan	Tamil	
1967	Kandan Karunai	Child Muruga	Tamil	
1967	Chithramela		Malayalam	
1969	Ballatha Pahayan		Malayalam	
1970	Namma Kuzhanthaigal		Tamil	
1971	Arutperunjothi		Tamil	
1972	Kurathi Magan	Raja	Tamil	
1974	Panathukkaga	Ravi	Tamil	
1976	Dasavatharam	Prince Lakshmanan	Tamil	
1977	Sneham		Malayalam	
1979	Lakshmi		Tamil	
1982	Krodham	Siva	Tamil	
1986	Nambinar Keduvathillai		Tamil	
1987	Mupperum Deviyar		Tamil	
1996	Vetri Vinayagar	Narathar	Tamil	

== Death ==
He had asthma for a long period and died on 11 December 2013 morning due to a sudden heart attack.
