= Chintadripet railway station =

Railway station in Tamil Nadu, India

Chintadripet Chintadripettai
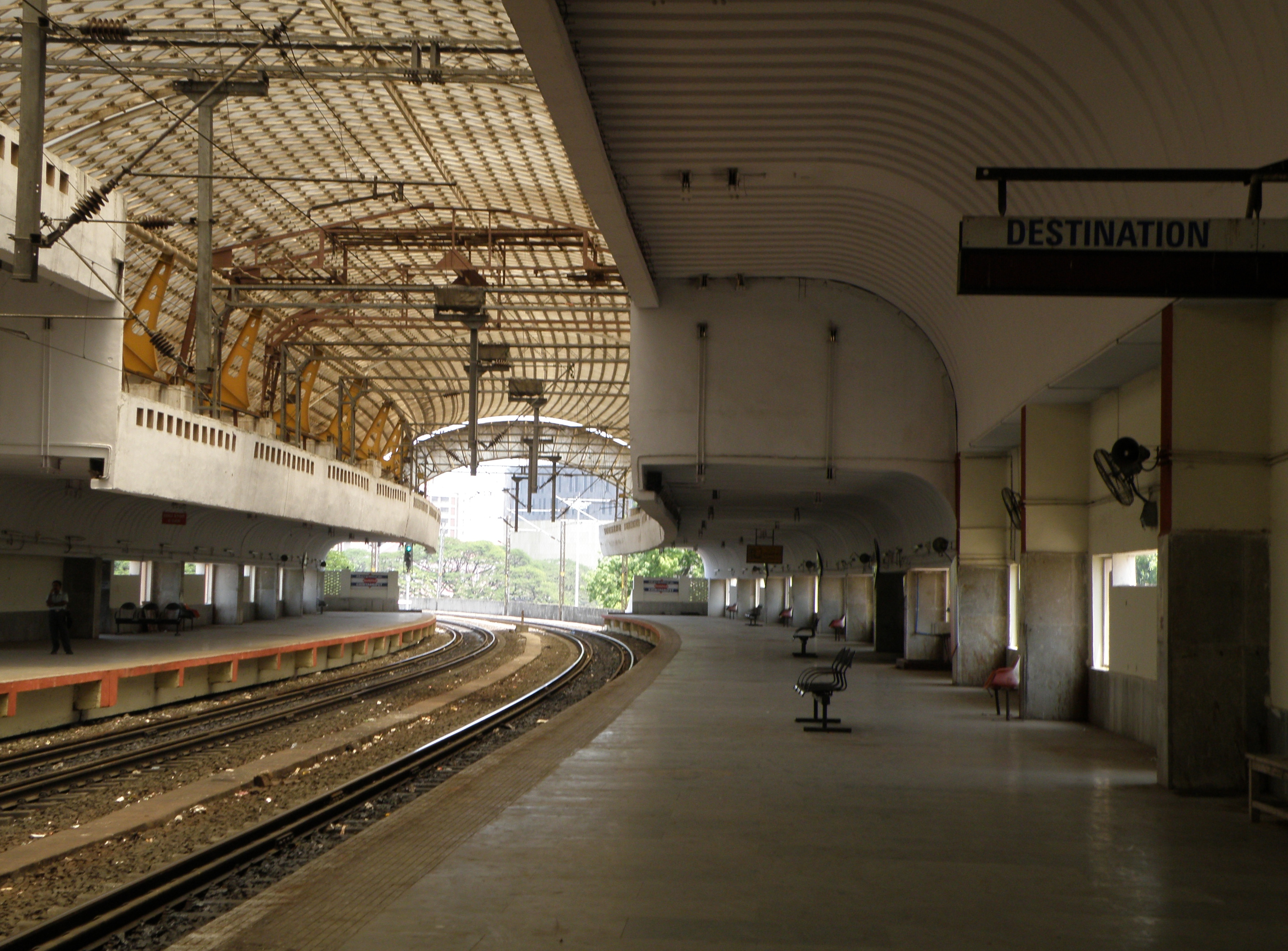
- Chintadripet MRTS Station

General information
- Coordinates: 13°04′26″N 80°16′26″E
- System: Chennai MRTS
- Platforms: Side platform Platform-1 → St. Thomas Mount; Platform-2 → Chennai Beach
- Tracks: 2
- Connections: Blue Line Government Estate

Construction
- Structure type: Elevated

History
- Opened: 1 November 1995

Services
Preceding station	Chennai MRTS	Following station
Chennai Park Town towards Chennai Beach	Line 1	Chepauk towards St. Thomas Mount
Location

Chintadripet is a railway station on the Chennai MRTS line. It was opened in November 1995. It is built on the bank of Cooum River alongside Arunachala Street, opposite the new secretariat building. The station is connected with the Chennai Metro Government Estate station. The station building contains a 1150 square metres parking area in its lower level. this station acted as a terminal station for few months during the closure of track between Chennai Beach to Chindadripettai section in lieu of the Chennai Beach Chennai Egmore 4th track works. And due to this works, MRTS section temporarily lost its one track between Chennai Fort and Chennai Beach stations due to the land dispute issue between the Reserve Bank of India and Southern Railways.

== Sub-station ==
In 1998, a traction sub-station was established at the station to cater to the power requirement of MRTS. As per the regulations of the Tamil Nadu Electricity Board (TNEB), the minimum monthly charges were to be based on the demand actually recorded in a month or 90 percent of the contracted demand, whichever was higher. Contracted demand for this sub-station was originally fixed at 5,200 kVA, which was subsequently reduced to 2,500 kVA with effect from February 1999.

== Station layout ==
G	Street level	Exit/Entrance
L1	Mezzanine	Fare control, Station ticket counters and Automatic ticket vending machines
L2	Side platform | Doors will open on the left
L2	Platform 2 Northbound	Towards → Chennai Beach; Next Station: Chennai Park Town
L2	Platform 1 Southbound	Towards ← St. Thomas Mount; Next Station: Chepauk
L2	Side platform | Doors will open on the left
L2

== Gallery ==
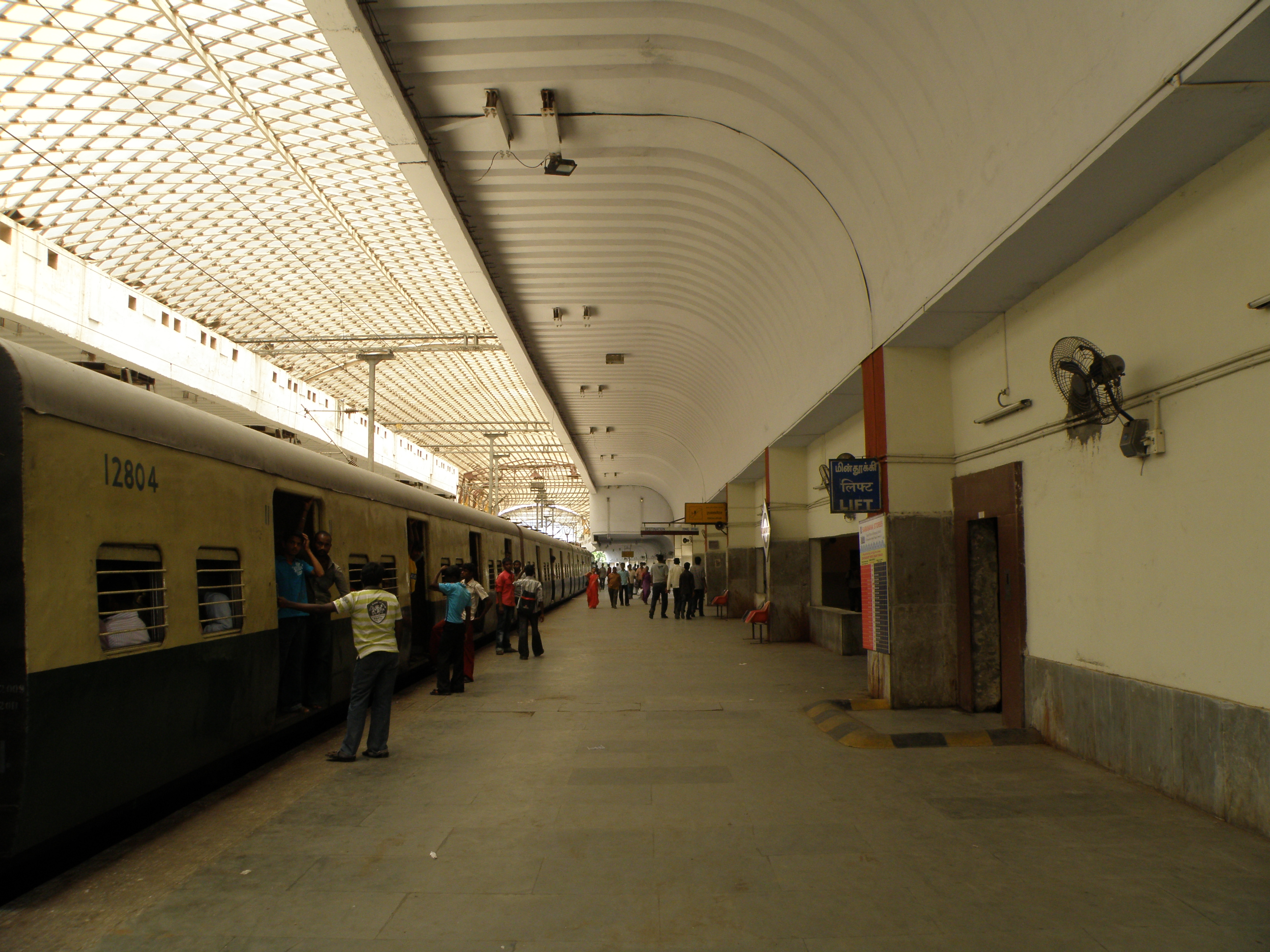
Passengers alighting at the station

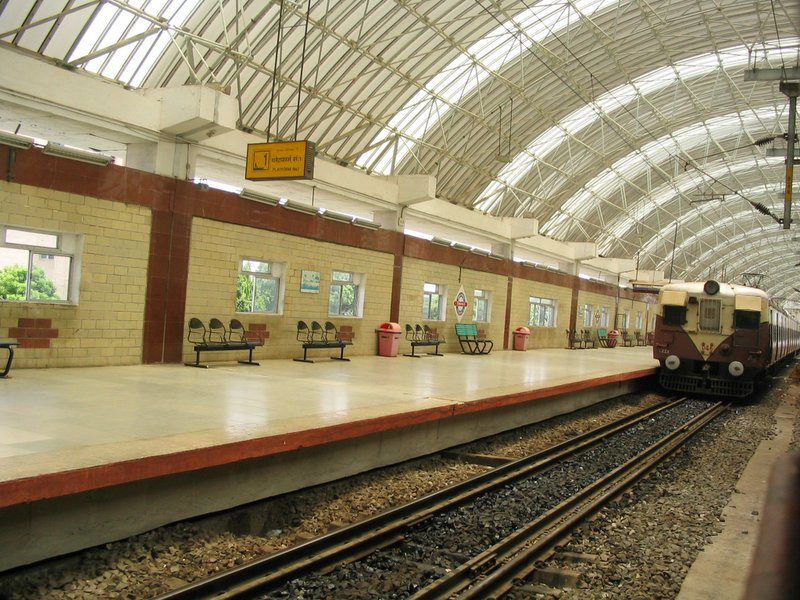
A train pulling into the station

== Maintenance ==
In 2010, nearly ₹ 3.4 million was spent on various kinds of maintenance activities at the station. The maintenance and beautification effort was carried out for the occasion of the inaugural function of the new secretariat building.

== See also ==
- Chennai MRTS
- Chennai suburban railway
- Chennai Metro
- Transport in Chennai
