= Ritchie Street =

Grey market for electronic goods in Chennai, India

Ritchie street is the grey market or unorganized shopping hub for electronic goods, chiefly from China and Korea, in Chennai, India. The market is centered in Ritchie Street and is spread through the surrounding Narasingapuram Street, Wallers Street, Meeran Sahib Street, Mohammed Hussain Sahib Street, and Guruappa Road, all adjacent to Anna Salai (formerly Mount Road). The street is always crowded, and very little space is available for movement of vehicles or pedestrians. It is also infamous for its sale of illegally copied content like video games and movies and had been listed as a notorious market in 2009 and 2010 by the USTR for selling counterfeit software, media and goods.

Ritchie street started as a radio market and then transformed into a market for televisions, computers, mobile phones and laptops. Today, the street has over 2,500 shops employing 15,000 people.

Ritchie Street is credited as the second largest electronic market for computer spares and peripherals in India, after Nehru Place, New Delhi, India. The market has a wide variety of goods ranging from electronics and robotics to LED lighting. The marketplace usually starts buzzing at around 11 am and dwindles at around 10 pm, after which it becomes difficult to find an open shop. This is due to the nature of the customers who visit Ritchie street, who are mostly working professionals and students. People usually get good deals for anything and everything, which is the reason why people flock to Ritchie street to buy goods.

== See also ==
- Burma Bazaar
- Shopping in Chennai
