= Dosti (1964 film) =

- Film poster
- Directed by: Satyen Bose
- Written by: Govind Moonis (dialogues)
- Screenplay by: Govind Moonis
- Story by: Ban Bhatt
- Produced by: Tarachand Barjatya
- Starring: Sudhir Kumar Sawant; Sushil Kumar Somaya; Sanjay Khan
- Cinematography: Marshall Braganza
- Edited by: G. G. Mayekar
- Music by: Laxmikant Pyarelal
- Distributed by: Rajshri Productions
- Release date: 6 November 1964
- Running time: 163 minutes
- Country: India
- Language: Hindi
- Box office: ₹2 crore

Dosti (transl. Friendship) is a 1964 Indian Hindi-language drama film directed by Satyen Bose, produced by Tarachand Barjatya, and distributed by Rajshri Productions. The film focuses on the friendship between two boys: one blind (Sudhir Kumar Sawant) and the other physically disabled (Sushil Kumar Somaya). The film also features Sanjay Khan, Farida Dadi, Nana Palsikar and Leela Mishra in supporting roles.

Dosti was amongst the top ten highest-grossing films of 1964, declared a "Super Hit" at the box office, and entered into the 4th Moscow International Film Festival. In 1977, the film was remade in Malayalam and Telugu as Sneham. Dosti won six Filmfare Awards out of seven nominated categories.

== Plot ==
Ramnath "Ramu" Gupta's father, a factory worker, dies in an accident. When the factory refuses to pay compensation that is due, his mother faints due to shock and falls down the stairs. Ramu is also injured in an accident and becomes crippled.

After being thrown out of his home, crippled, and penniless, he roams around the streets of Mumbai. He meets Mohan (Sawant), a blind boy who has a similar background: Mohan has a sister, Meena, who left for Mumbai to find work as a nurse to pay for her brother's treatment. Mohan eventually left the village after his caretaker died.

Ramu is good at playing the harmonica while Mohan is good at singing. They collaborate and sing songs on the road to earn money from pedestrians. Ramu wants to finish his studies, and they both befriend a small girl, Manjula, who is the sister of a rich man, Ashok. Manjula has rheumatic heart disease and both the boys hope she would help them out.

Ramu and Mohan visit Manjula and ask for a loan of sixty rupees, the amount exactly required for Ramu's admission in school. Manjula's brother rebuffs them and gives them only five rupees. Feeling insulted, Mohan successfully raises the money by singing. Ramu is admitted to the school after performing very well on the entrance test. They move to a new house in a slum after someone tries to steal their hard-earned money while they slept on the footpath. Their new neighbor is Mausi, who lives with her teenage daughter and son, and treats Ramu and Mohan as her own sons.

In school, Ramu excels in studies despite being a regular target of ridicule by richer students who do not consider him their equal and often degrade him for being a "street beggar". The headmaster and teacher look after Ramu before the teacher Sharma Ji declares himself as Ramu's guardian. During a visit to Ramu's house, Sharma Ji notices that the neighborhood is unfit for his studies and suggests that Ramu move in with him, but Ramu does not want to leave Mohan. One day, while singing, Mohan hears Ashok calling out to Meena and rushes to embrace his long lost sister, but she is ashamed that Mohan has become a beggar and refuses to recognize him. Meena is looking after Manjula and there is a budding romance between her and Ashok. Meena confesses to him, and he consoles her that she would be with her brother soon.

Mohan senses Manjula while sleeping and tells Ramu about it. Both decide to go and meet her, but she dies. Ashok brings Mohan home one day and gives him Manjula's chime as her remembrance. When he tries to tell Mohan about Meena, Mohan lashes out in rage and says that he considers himself to be alone in the world, save for his friend Ramu.

Soon after, Ramu gets in trouble with some ruffians and is mistakenly arrested by police during a burglary. Sharma Ji goes to the police station and bails out Ramu, on the condition that he will live with Sharma Ji and cut off contact with Mohan. Mohan is heartbroken and decides to visit him. But Sharma Ji doesn't allow him to talk to Mohan. Sad, Mohan roams the streets singing sad songs.

Sharma Ji suddenly dies, leaving Ramu devastated. Ramu decides not to take the final exam as he is unable to pay the fees. Mohan hears about it and decides to raise the money by singing in the streets in spite of his ill health. He successfully earns the money and pays the fees without Ramu's knowledge before falling ill and being admitted to the hospital. Without telling him, Meena cares for Mohan as he recuperates.

Ramu places first in the exams and learns of Mohan's sacrifice. He rushes to Mohan in the hospital to ask for forgiveness where Mohan says that he was never angry with him. The doctor tells Mohan about Meena and he forgives her. The movie ends with all of them in a loving embrace.

== Cast ==
- Sushil Kumar Somaya as Ramnath "Ramu" Gupta
- Sudhir Kumar Sawant as Mohan
- Baby Farida as Manjula "Manju"
- Sanjay Khan as Ashok
- Leela Mishra as Mausi
- Leela Chitnis as Ramu's mother, Mrs Gupta
- Abhi Bhattacharya as Headmaster
- Uma Rajoo as Nurse Meena (Mohan's sister)
- Nana Palshikar as School Teacher Sharma Ji
- Moolchand as Ashok's employee

== Soundtrack ==
The lyrics of the film were written by Majrooh Sultanpuri and composed by Laxmikant Pyarelal. Music director R. D. Burman played the harmonica on film scores and soundtracks. Dosti is a notable point in the musical duo's career as it won them their first Filmfare Award and made them popular in the film industry. Mohammed Rafi is the main vocalist for the songs and one song was sung by Lata Mangeshkar.

Song	Singer	Raga
"Gudiya Humse Roothi Rahogi..."	Lata Mangeshkar	Pahadi
"Jaanewalon Zara Mudke Dekho Mujhe..."	Mohammed Rafi	Pahadi
"Chaahunga Main Tujhe Sanjh Savere..."	Mohammed Rafi	Pahadi
"Mera To Jo Bhi Kadam Hai Woh Teri Raahon Mein Hai..."	Mohammed Rafi	
"Koi Jab Raah Na Paaye Mere Ghar Aaye Ke Pag Pag Deep Jalaaye..."	Mohammed Rafi	
"Raahi Manwa Dukh Ki Chinta Kyun Satati Hai Dukh Toh Apna Saathi Hai..."	Mohammed Rafi	

== 12th Filmfare Awards ==
The film won six awards from the seven nominations that it received. Dosti won the most awards of any film at that ceremony.

=== Won ===
- Best Film - Tarachand Barjatya
- Best Music Director - Laxmikant Pyarelal
- Best Story - Ban Bhatt
- Best Dialogue - Govind Moonis
- Best Playback Singer - Mohammad Rafi for the song "Chahoonga Main Tujhe Saanj Savere"
- Best Lyricist - Majrooh Sultanpuri for the song "Chahoonga Main Tujhe Saanj Savere"

=== Nominated ===
- Best Director - Satyen Bose
