= I Marinella Tragouda Mimi Plessa & Gianni Spano =

Compilation album by Marinella
- Released: 1996
- Recorded: Athens, 1966–1984
- Genre: World music, Folk, Modern Laika
- Length
- Language: Greek
- Label: PolyGram Greece, Mercury
- Producer: PolyGram Records

Marinella chronology
I Marinella Tragouda Giorgo Zampeta & Aki Panou (1996)	I Marinella Tragouda Mimi Plessa & Gianni Spano (1996)	Gia Proti Fora (1997)

Marinella compilation album chronology
I Marinella Tragouda Giorgo Zampeta & Aki Panou (1996)	I Marinella Tragouda Mimi Plessa & Gianni Spano (1996)	Ta 45aria Tis Marinellas (1996)

I Marinella tragouda Mimi Plessa & Gianni Spano (Greek: Η Μαρινέλλα τραγουδά Μίμη Πλέσσα & Γιάννη Σπανό; Marinella in songs of Mimis Plessas and Giannis Spanos) is a compilation by Greek singer Marinella. It was released in 1996 in Greece by PolyGram Greece – Mercury and includes 17 recordings of songs composed by Mimis Plessas and Giannis Spanos that Marinella recorded from 1966 to 1984 for PolyGram Records and EMI.

== Track listing ==
1. "Apopse se thelo" (Απόψε σε θέλω) – (Mimis Plessas – Lefteris Papadopoulos) – 3:52
  - This song had been released on Otan Simani Esperinos and as a single on 7 July 1969.
2. "Anixe petra (na kleisto)" (Άνοιξε πέτρα) – (Mimis Plessas – Lefteris Papadopoulos) – 3:29
  - This song had been released on Stalia – Stalia and as a single on 28 November 1968.
3. "Ama dite to feggari" (Άμα δείτε το φεγγάρι) – (Mimis Plessas – Lefteris Papadopoulos) – 2:38
  - This song had been released on Stalia – Stalia and as a single on 28 November 1968.
4. "Zografismena sto charti" (Ζωγραφισμένα στο χαρτί) – (Mimis Plessas – Akos Daskalopoulos) – 2:27
  - This song had been released on Ena Tragoudi Ein' I Zoi Mou and as a single on 29 October 1970.
5. "To mantalo" (Το μάνταλο) – (Mimis Plessas – Ilias Lymperopoulos) – 2:18
  - This song had been released as a single on 7 July 1972.
6. "To veloudenio sou to yelekaki" (Το βελουδένιο σου το γελεκάκι) – (Mimis Plessas – Lefteris Papadopoulos) – 2:52
  - This song had been released on Otan Simani Esperinos and as a single on 7 July 1969.
7. "Thalassa mou" (Θάλασσα μου) – (Mimis Plessas – Akos Daskalopoulos) – 2:17
  - This song had been released on Marinella and as a single in 1966.
8. "Den pirazi, de variese" (Δεν πειράζει, δε βαριέσαι) – (Mimis Plessas – Ilias Lymperopoulos) – 2:38
  - This song had been released as a single on 19 January 1973.
9. "Dos mou t' athanato nero" (Δώσ' μου τ' αθάνατο νερό) – (Mimis Plessas – Akos Daskalopoulos) – 3:22
  - This song had been released on Ena Tragoudi Ein' I Zoi Mou and as a single on 29 October 1970.
10. "Tin ora pou stamatise i vrochi" (Την ώρα που σταμάτησε η βροχή) – (Mimis Plessas – Ilias Lymperopoulos) – 3:03
  - This song had been released as a single on 7 July 1972.
11. "Eklapsa hthes" (Έκλαψα χθες) – (Mimis Plessas – Akos Daskalopoulos) – 2:37
  - This song had been released on Marinella and as a single in 1966.
12. "Ke tora" (Και τώρα) – (Mimis Plessas – Ilias Lymperopoulos) – 2:40
  - This song had been released as a single on 19 January 1973.
13. "Ti vradia mou apopse" (Τη βραδιά μου απόψε) – (Giannis Spanos – Alekos Sakellarios) – 2:26
  - This song had been released on Ena Tragoudi Ein' I Zoi Mou on 27 March 1970.
14. "O Nontas" (Ο Νώντας) – (Giannis Spanos – Sotia Tsotou) – 2:50
  - This song had been released on Ena Tragoudi Ein' I Zoi Mou and as a single on 10 December 1970.
15. "Hthes arga" (Χθες αργά) – (Giannis Spanos – Kostas Kotoulas) – 3:10
  - This song had been released on Ena Tragoudi Ein' I Zoi Mou on 27 March 1970.
16. "Me pnigi touti i siopi" (Με πνίγει τούτη η σιωπή) – (Giannis Spanos – Kostas Kotoulas) – 3:20
  - This song had been released on Ena Tragoudi Ein' I Zoi Mou and as a single on 10 December 1970.
17. "Pes pos m' antamoses" (Πες πως μ' αντάμωσες) – (Giannis Spanos – Lefteris Papadopoulos) – 4:07
  - This song had been released on Megales Stigmes on 29 August 1984.

== Personnel ==
- Marinella – vocals, background vocals
- Mimis Plessas – arranger, conductor on tracks 1 – 12
- Giannis Spanos – arranger, conductor on tracks 13 – 16
- Kostas Klavvas – arranger, conductor on "Pes pos m' antamoses"
- Yiannis Smyrneos – recording engineer
- PolyGram Records – producer
- Alinta Mavrogeni – photographer
- Petros Paraschis – artwork
