= I Marinella Tragouda Giorgo Zampeta & Aki Panou =

Compilation album by Marinella
- Released: 1996
- Recorded: Athens, 1967–1972
- Genre: World music, Folk, Modern Laika
- Length: 48:26
- Language: Greek
- Label: PolyGram Greece, Mercury
- Producer: PolyGram Records

Marinella chronology
I Prova Tou Nifikou (1995)	I Marinella Tragouda Giorgo Zampeta & Aki Panou (1996)	I Marinella Tragouda Mimi Plessa & Gianni Spano (1996)

Marinella compilation album chronology
Ta Prota Mou Tragoudia 1967–1970 (1996)	I Marinella Tragouda Giorgo Zampeta & Aki Panou (1996)	I Marinella Tragouda Mimi Plessa & Gianni Spano (1996)

I Marinella tragouda Giorgo Zampeta & Aki Panou (Greek: Η Μαρινέλλα τραγουδά Γιώργο Ζαμπέτα & Άκη Πάνου; Marinella in songs of Giorgos Zampetas and Akis Panou) is a compilation by Greek singer Marinella. It was released in 1996 in Greece by PolyGram Greece – Mercury and includes 17 recordings of songs composed by Giorgos Zampetas and Akis Panou that Marinella recorded from 1967 to 1972 for PolyGram Records.

== Track listing ==
1. "Stalia – stalia" (Σταλιά – σταλιά) – (Giorgos Zampetas – Dionisis Tzefronis) – 3:23
  - This song had been released on Stalia – Stalia and as a single on 11 March 1968.
2. "Pios ein' aftos" (Ποιος είν' αυτός) – (Giorgos Zampetas – Pythagoras) – 3:10
  - This song had been released on Stalia – Stalia and as a single on 30 November 1968.
3. "Ti na ftei" (Τι να φταίει) – (Giorgos Zampetas – Dimitris Christodoulou) – 3:05
  - This song had been released on Otan Simani Esperinos and as a single on 10 June 1969.
4. "Kane kardia mou ipomoni" (Κάνε καρδιά μου υπομονή) – (Giorgos Zampetas – Charalampos Vasiliadis) – 2:38
  - This song had been released on Ena Tragoudi Ein' I Zoi Mou on 27 March 1970.
5. "De symfonisame" (Δε συμφωνήσαμε) – (Giorgos Zampetas – Giannis Kalamitsis) – 2:40
  - This song had been released as a single on 14 September 1972.
6. "Den ginete allios" (Δεν γίνεται αλλιώς) – (Giorgos Zampetas – Giannis Kalamitsis) – 3:17
  - This song had been released as a single on 14 September 1972.
7. "I astati" (Η άστατη) – (Giorgos Zampetas – Pythagoras) – 3:05
  - This song had been released as a single on 20 October 1970.
8. "Vale pioto" (Βάλε πιοτό) – (Giorgos Zampetas – Pythagoras) – 2:42
  - This song had been released on Marinella – Enas Mythos and as a single on 20 October 1970.
9. "Se kartero" (Σε καρτερώ) – (Giorgos Zampetas – Charalampos Vasiliadis) – 3:13
  - This song had been released on Ena Tragoudi Ein' I Zoi Mou on 27 March 1970.
10. "Enas taxidiotis" (Ένας ταξιδιώτης) – (Giorgos Zampetas – Dionisis Tzefronis) – 3:09
  - This song had been released on Stalia – Stalia and as a single on 19 March 1968.
11. "Pira tou dromous" (Πήρα τους δρόμους) – (Giorgos Zampetas – Dimitris Christodoulou) – 2:42
  - This song had been released on Stalia – Stalia and as a single on 11 March 1968.
12. "Mia agapi chanete" (Μια αγάπη χάνεται) – (Giorgos Zampetas – Pythagoras) – 3:00
  - This song had been released as a single on 19 March 1968.
13. "Vathia sti thalassa tha peso" (Βαθιά στη θάλασσα θα πέσω) – (Giorgos Zambetas – Charalampos Vasiliadis) – 3:17
  - This song had been released on Athanata Rebetika on 24 November 1972.
14. "Ta pikramena dilina" (Τα πικραμένα δειλινά) – (Giorgos Zampetas – Napoleon Eleftheriou) – 2:48
  - This song had been released on Otan Simani Esperinos and as a single on 10 June 1969.
15. "Glikocharazi, xipnise" – (Γλυκοχαράζει, ξύπνησε) – (Giorgos Zampetas – Charalampos Vasiliadis) – 2:59
  - This song had been released on Stalia – Stalia and as a single on 30 November 1968.
16. "Kita me sta matia" (Κοίτα με στα μάτια) – (Akis Panou) – 3:16
  - This song had been released as a single on 13 April 1971.
17. "Piretos (Kathe gnorimia)" (Πυρετός) – (Akis Panou) – 2:42
  - This song had been released as a single on 13 April 1971.

== Personnel ==
- Marinella – vocals, background vocals
- Giorgos Zampetas – arranger, conductor on tracks 1 – 15
- Akis Panou – arranger, conductor on tracks 16 and 17
- Mimis Plessas – arranger, conductor on "Vathia sti thalassa tha peso"
- Yiannis Smyrneos – recording engineer
- PolyGram Records – producer
- Alinta Mavrogeni – photographer
- Petros Paraschis – artwork
