= Stratos Dionysiou =

- Also known as: To Geraki tis pistas
- Born: Stratos Dionysiou; 8 November 1935; Nigrita, Kingdom of Greece
- Died: 11 May 1990 (aged 54) Athens, Greece
- Genres: Laïko, rebetiko
- Occupations: Singer, composer, lyricist
- Instrument: Guitar
- Years active: 1958–1990

Stratos Dionysiou (Greek: Στράτος Διονυσίου; 8 November 1935 – 11 May 1990), nicknamed "To Geraki tis Pistas" (The hawk of the stage), was a Greek singer, composer and lyricist.

== Early life ==
Stratos Dionysiou was born on 8 November 1935, in Nigrita. He was the son of Angelos and Stasa Dionysiou, refugees from Aivali in Asia Minor. In 1947, he moved to Eptalofos of Ampelokipi, Thessaloniki. A year later, his father died. In 1955 he married his childhood love, Georgia Laveni, with whom they had four children: Angelos, Tasoula, Stelios and Diamantis. He was a fan of PAOK.

== Singing career ==
=== Early career ===
At first, he sang for free in nightclubs, and after working as a peddler and tailor, he debuted as a professional singer at the nightclub "Farida" in Thessaloniki. From his first appearances in the 1950s, Dionysiou attracted the interest of some artists, who urged him to come down to Athens to make more important collaborations.

Dionysiou left Thessaloniki for Athens to further his singing career. He appeared in Nikaia nightclub "Asteras" with well-established singer Kaity Grey and in 1958 recorded his first song, "Paranges kai Palatia" (Shacks and Palaces). A year later, he recorded a song by Xristos Kolokotronis, "Ego den eimai enoxos" (I am not Guilty). The song was very successful, because it was released around the same time when Caryl Chessman's execution happened, and people drew connections between the song's lyrics and title and Chessman's death sentence. However, Dionysiou's voice was often mistaken for Stelios Kazantzidis' voice. Dionysiou signed a contract with the recording company Columbia and started singing songs by Xristos Kolokotronis, Babis Bakalis, Kostas Virvos, and others with some success. He also re-recorded old, pre-war and WW2-era rebetiko-gerne songs by Vassilis Tsitsanis, Yiannis Papaioannou, Giorgos Mitsakis and Manolis Chiotis. Huge success, however, did not come until the late 1960s, when he turned several Akis Panou songs into hits: "Και τι δεν κάνω" (What don't I do), "Γιατί καλέ γειτόνισσα" (Why, my good neighbour?), "Του κόσμου το περίγελο" (The laughing stock of the World), "Εγώ καλά σου τα 'λεγα" (I told you so), "Στο σταθμό του Μονάχου" (At Munich Station), "Ήταν ψεύτικα" (They were false) and many others. During his time working at Columbia, he also sang remakes of Indian songs such as "Kardia mou kaimeni" (My poor heart), remake of the Indian song Duniya mein hum aaye hain, featured in the 1957 movie Mother India.

In the nightclub "SOU-MOU" where he appeared, he was the second most popular singer; he sang along with female singer Anthoula Alifragki. It's the same nightclub where Mimis Plessas heard him in 1969, and after two months, he wrote the legendary zeibekiko "Vrehi fotia stin strata mou" (Fire is raining down my path) with lyrics by Lefteris Papadopoulos. The song was featured in the 1970 movie "Oratotis Miden" (Zero Visibility) starring Nikos Kourkoulos. Then Dionysiou released the successful songs "O paliatzis", "Baglamades ki bouzoukia", "Enas aitos gremiste", "Agapi mou epikindini" and "Aphilotimi". In the early 1970s, he collaborated with Haris Alexiou, Lizeta Nikolaou and Sofi Pappa in Backing Vocals. Dionysiou also toured the United States with great success.

=== Arrest and imprisonment ===
In 1973, he was arrested for illegal gun possession and hashish found in his car. He himself claimed that it was a conspiracy of competitors. He was found innocent of gun possession in 1974, but in 1975, on April 9, the trial of the notorious drug-trafficking case began at the Criminal Court of Thessaloniki. The decision that came out on May 30 sentenced him to imprisonment and exile (the latter was part of the typical sentence for drug-related offences). He was released thanks to an amnesty from prison in the spring of 1976. At this moment, his colleague and friend Tolis Voskopoulos, who in 1977 wrote and gave him the song "I fell asleep", especially supported him. While in prison, he recorded and released the album "Pali Mazi mas".

=== Post-release career ===
The climate in public opinion was heavy. When Dionysiou was released from prison, he was faced with rejection. No high-profile company wanted to work with him and no businessman wanted him in their nightclub.

But Stratos did not give up. He persisted and finally managed to return to the music scene with the Minos company. The director of the company at the time was Makis Matsas, who viewed the collaboration with Stratos with great reservations. The prison sentence had discredited Dionysiou's career. But for Matsas, there was another big problem. Stelios Kazantzidis was also recording in Minos at the time, and the coexistence of two big names in the same space might have created problems. After the pressure that Matsas received from Dionysiou, they finally signed a contract with discouraging conditions for the singer.

If the first record they would make did not exceed 30,000 sales, their collaboration would stop there. Otherwise, they would make two more records on the same terms. The sales of the first album, which had the title "Ypokrinese" (You are pretending), exceeded 100,000 within a few months. Stratos was rewarded for his persistence. The big "comeback" had taken place and the successes followed one another. "I packed up the things", "You took everything and left", "A thin booth" are just some of the songs that Stratos recorded after prison.

In 1987, he opened his own nightclub named "Stratos", in Filellinon Street.

== Personal life ==
Dionysiou married Georgia Laveni in 1955 and had four children, Angelos, Stelios, Diamantis and Tasoula Dionysiou. Of Stratos' four children, Angelos, Diamantis and Stelios Dionysiou are also singers. His daughter, Tasoula Dionysiou, died in April 2012 at the age of 53. From 1980-1989, while married, he had a relationship with Marina Vlaxaki, a singer who was his backing vocalist.

=== Political views ===
Although Dionysiou described himself as a "New Democrat", he believed that everybody was "The same shit", believing that all parties lead to same negative results. He disliked ELAS, due to them letting a Security Battalions commander named Papoulias escape after he bribed them. He was critical of America's influence in Greece, stating, "I believe Greece is being ordered by the big bosses, the Americans, they have separated us for years and we are like plots of land of America. We will do whatever America wants".

== Death ==
Dionysiou died of abdominal aortic aneurysm, in Athens, on 11 May 1990, at age 54.

His funeral took place in the First Cemetery of Athens. His funeral was attended by hundreds of people as well as other singers and actors. A few hours before his last breath, he was singing in "Stratos", while earlier, that same afternoon, he recorded nine songs for the record "Poios allos" (Who Else) which was released a month after his death, making a sales records. According to Takis Mousafiris, the last song he recorded that day was "Don't leave me alone".

== Legacy ==
His funeral took the form of lying in state. For some time, people were pushing to get close to the singer's body, while there were women who fainted. Many, in order to be able to see, climbed on neighboring graves, causing damage, which was later paid for by the Dionysiou family. "All roads were closed. I mean, I was speechless. I didn't expect so many simple people loved Stratos. He was, after all, the great popular singer", said Giorgos Polychroniadis, who sang together with Dionysiou. People said goodbye to their favorite singer with songs. Stratos Dionysiou's death left behind songs that are still heard today, but also a great void in Greek music. After Dionysiou's death, Notis Sfakianakis released the song "o Stratos" in his honor.

== Discography ==
Year	Title	Notes
1969	Στράτος Διονυσίου	
1970	Μαζί με το Στράτο	
1971	Στράτος Διονυσίου (3)	
1972	4.5.3	Contributed 5 songs
1972	Στράτος Διονυσίου 4	
1973	Μπαγλαμάδες και μπουζούκια	
1974	Νεώτερα κι ανώτερα	Contributed 6 songs
1974	Τα 12 του Στράτου	
1974	Χρυσός Δίσκος	Contributed 2 songs
1975	Τραγουδά Άκη Πάνου	
1976	Πάλι μαζί μας	
1976	Πικρά κι ανθρώπινα	
1977	14 Χρυσές Επιτυχίες	
1977	Αν ξαναζούσα	
1977	Αξέχαστα τραγούδια	
1978	14 Χρυσές Επιτυχίες Νο 2	
1978	Τα Ορθόδοξα	50.000 sales (golden disk)
1979	Γυναίκες γυναίκες	
1980	Υποκρίνεσαι	100.000 sales (platinum disc)
1981	Όλα είναι δανεικά	100.000 sales (platinum disc)
1981	Τα ωραία του Διονυσίου	
1982	Αξέχαστες επιτυχίες	
1982	Θυμήσου	50.000 sales (golden disk)
1983	Αξέχαστες επιτυχίες 2	
1983	Της γυναίκας η καρδιά	50.000 sales (golden disk)
1984	Λαϊκά και πάσης Ελλάδος	Contributed 5 songs, 50.000 sales (golden disk)
1984	Μόνο οι ερωτευμένοι	50.000 sales (golden disk)
1985	Αυτά που τραγουδήσαμε	
1985	Ο Σαλονικιός	100.000 sales (platinum disc)
1986	Για πάντα	
1986	Ο ταξιτζής	Contributed 5 songs, 50.000 sales (golden disk)
1987	Δυο δυο	Contributed 7 songs
1987	Κράτησε με	Contributed 2 songs
1987	Οι Μεγαλύτερες Επιτυχίες Του	
1987	Ο λαός τραγούδι θέλει	50.000 sales (golden disk)
1987	Ζωντανή Ηχογράφηση	Contributed 2 songs
1988	Εγώ ο ξένος	150.000 sales (platinum disc)
1989	Νομίζεις	100.000 sales (platinum disc)

=== Posthumous ===
Year	Title	Notes
1990	Ποιος Αλλος	130.000 sales (platinum disc)
1990	30 Χρονια Επιτυχιες	2 Cd (200.000 sales) (platinum disc)
1990	Mega Souxe	
1991	Η Ελλάδα Του Στέλιου και Του Στράτου	
1991	Στα Ξενυχτάδικα Της Αγκαλιάς Σου (Συμμετοχή 2 Τραγούδια)	
1991	Τα Λαϊκά	
1991	Τραγούδια για τούς φίλους του	
1993	Τα Ζεϊμπέκικα Του Γρηγόρη και Του Στράτου	
1994	Από τους θησαυρούς των 45 στροφών	
1994	Τα Ωραία του Διονυσίου	
1995	Αξέχαστες Επιτυχίες Νο 2	
1996	Τραγούδια από τις 45 στροφές 1	
1996	Τα Σπάνια	
1997	Αξέχαστα τραγούδια	
1997	Τραγούδια από τις 45 στροφές 2	
1997	Τα τραγούδια που αγαπήσαμε	
1998	Αγάπης βάσανα	
1998	Τραγούδια από τις 45 στροφές 3	
2000	Άκου βρε φίλε	
2000	Τραγούδια από τις 45 στροφές 4	
2000	Οι Μεγαλύτερες Επιτυχίες Του	
2000	Πρώτη Εκτέλεση (Συμμετοχή 3 Τραγούδια)	
2001	Τραγούδια από τις 45 στροφές 5	
2002	Οι Μεγαλύτερες Επιτυχίες Του Νο 2	
2002	Τα Αυθεντικά (4 Cd)	
2003	Βρέχει φωτιά στη στράτα μου (2 Cd)	
2004	Τ΄αγκάθια της καρδιάς	
2004	Της Νύχτας Το Μινόρε	
2005	Ο Στεναγμός Μου	
2005	Τα τραγούδια του Στράτου (2 Cd)	
2006	14 Μεγάλα Τραγούδια	
2006	14 Μεγάλα Τραγούδια Νο 2	
2006	Για Πάντα Live Στην Αμερική (2 Cd)	
2006	Ανθολογία - 1934-1990 (4 Cd)	
2007	Ένας Δίσκος Η Ζωή Του (6 Cd)	
2007	Τραγουδάει Μίμη Πλέσσα (2 Cd)	
2007	Τραγουδάει Τάκη Σούκα (2 Cd)	
2008	Βρέχει φωτιά στη στράτα μου (4 Cd)	
2008	Χρυσή Δισκοθήκη	
2009	Αφιέρωμα Στο Στράτο	
2009	Live Ηχογραφήσεις (2 CD)	
2009	Ντοκουμέντα	
2009	Ο Λαός Τραγούδι Θέλει (6 CD)	
2012	Ο Λαός Τραγούδι Θέλει Best of (4 CD)	
