= Stelios Kazantzidis: Ta zeibekika =

Ta Zeibekika

Greatest hits album by Stelios Kazantzidis
- Released: June, 2003
- Recorded: Athens, in 1990s
- Genre: World music, Folk, Laïko, Zeibekiko
- Length: 64:14
- Label: MBI (Music Box International)

Ta Zeibekika (Greek: Τα Zειμπέκικα; English: The Zeibekiko songs, alternative form Ta Zeibekika Tis Nichtas) is an album by popular Greek singer Stelios Kazantzidis. It was released in June, 2003 by MBI (Music Box International) in Greece and it contains 18 greatest hits that were re-recorded by Stelios Kazantzidis in the 1990s.

== Track listing ==
1. "Vradiazi" - (Βραδιάζει; Getting dark) - (Christos Nikolopoulos-Sotia Tsotou) - 3:28
2. "Girizo apo ti nichta" - (Γυρίζω από τη νύχτα; Returning from the night) - (Christos Nikolopoulos-Pythagoras) - 3:01
3. "Sto trapezi pou ta pino" - (Στο τραπέζι που τα πίνω; At the table where I drink) - (Apostolos Kaldaris-Eftychia Papagianopoulou) - 3:06
4. "Den tha xanagapiso" - (Δεν θα ξαναγαπήσω; I will never love again) - (Manos Loïzos-Lefteris Papadopoulos) - 4:01
5. "Ki' an gelao ine psema" - (Κι' αν γελάω είναι ψέμα; If I laugh is a lie) - (Stelios Kazantzidis-Vangelis Atraidis) - 3:44
6. "Dio portes echi i zoi" - (Δυο πόρτες έχει η ζωή; Life has two doors) - (Stelios Kazantzidis-Eftychia Papagianopoulou)
7. "Kanis den irthe na me di" - (Κανείς δεν ήρθε να με δει; No one came to see me) - (Christos Kolokotronis-Kostas Lavidas) - 3:33
8. "Katastrofes ke simfores" - (Καταστροφές και συμφορές; Destruction and misfortune) - (Theodoros Derveniotis-Christos Kolokotronis) - 4:03
9. "Sighorese me" - (Συγχώρεσε με; Forgive me) - (Stelios Kazantzidis) - 3:29
10. "San apokliros girizo" - (Σαν απόκληρος γυρίζω; As disherited I wander) - (Vassilis Tsitsanis) - 4:34
11. "Tis gerakinas yios" - (Της γερακίνας γιος; Son of the hawk) - (Vassilis Tsitsanis-Kostas Virvos) - 3:36
12. "Prin to charama monachos" - (Πριν το χάραμα μονάχος; Before daybreak, alone) - (Giannis Papaioannou-Haralambos Vasiliadis) - 3:21
13. "Iliovasilema sosto" - (Ηλιοβασίλεμα σωστό; The right sunset) - (Giorgos Loukas-Kostas Manessis) - 3:36
14. "Peftoun tis vrochis i stales" - (Πέφτουν της βροχής οι στάλες; The raindrops are falling) - (Vassilis Tsitsanis) - 3:15
15. "Pikra ki' adiko" - (Πίκρα κι' άδικο; Bitterness and unjust) - (Thanassis Polykandriotis-Lefteris Hapsiadis) - 2:46
16. "Sto pikrameno dilino" - (Στο πικραμένο δειλινό; The bitter evening) - (Sotiris Zoiopoulos-Haralambos Vasiliadis) - 3:24
17. "Kardia paraponiara" - (Καρδιά παραπονιάρα; Murmured heart) - (Apostolos Hatzichristou-Yiannis Lelakis) - 3:46
18. "O psaras" - (Ο ψαράς; The fisher) - (Giorgos Mitsakis) - 3:43

== Personnel ==
- Stelios Kazantzidis - vocals
- Andreas Serves - photographer
- Argiro Sirriga - artwork
