= Mantoubala =

1959 song by Stelios Kazantzidis

Song by Stelios Kazantzidis
- Language: Greek
- Released: March 1959
- Genre: Laïko
- Label: Columbia Records
- Composer: Stelios Kazantzidis
- Lyricist: Eftychia Papagianopoulou

"Mantoubala" (also spelled "Mandoubala", "Mandubala" or "Madhubala"; Μαντουμπάλα) is a 1959 Greek laïko song composed (Note: Although the song was adapted from an original Hindi song, Kazantzidis is credited as the composer.) and performed by Stelios Kazantzidis, with lyrics by Eftychia Papagianopoulou. Adapted from the Hindi song "Aajao Tadapte Hain Armaan" from the 1951 film Awaara, it was produced during a period when Hindi cinema enjoyed widespread popularity in Greece. The song's title was inspired by Indian film actress Madhubala, whose name is also referenced in the lyrics.

"Mantoubala" was a major commercial success in Greece. According to scholar Helen Abadzi, it sold more than 96,000 copies within a year of release and surpassed the previous Greek sales record for a single. The song later gained popularity in Israel, where it was performed by Aris San and inspired a Hebrew-language adaptation by HaGashash HaHiver. In 1964, Kazantzidis released a sequel duet with Marinella titled "The Return of Mantoubala".

== Background and composition ==
During the 1950s, Hindi cinema emerged as a significant cultural phenomenon in Greece. The movement began with the success of the 1952 film Aan (released locally as Mangala, the Rose of India) and was sustained by the popularity of melodramatic Hindi musical themes that resonated with post-war Greek society. Within this context, Greek singers began adapting original Hindi soundtracks by writing Greek text over existing melodies, a subgenre within laïko music. These singers include Stelios Kazantzidis, Babis Bakalis and Voula Palla.

"Mantoubala" adapted elements from the Hindi song "Aajao Tadapte Hain Armaan" from Raj Kapoor's 1951 film Awaara, which was released in Greece as The Vagabond of Bombay and was highly popular with Greek audiences. Scholar Helen Abadzi identify "Mantoubala" as possibly the second Indo-Greek song produced after Manolis Angelopoulos's "Magala".

== Lyrics ==
Kazantzidis initially wrote "Mantoubala" with the hook line, "With watery eyes, I roam the streets". At his mother's request, he subsequently approached the lyricist Eftychia Papagianopoulou to write the remaining lyrics.

The title of the song was directly inspired by contemporary Indian film star Madhubala. Writing for Outlook India, Debiparna Chakraborty noted that the song reflected Madhubala's popularity in Greece, featuring the actress as "a romantic fantasy figure, a pop-culture crush crystallised into melody".

A loose translation of the lyrics, according to The Indian Express:

"I wish I could see you and then die, my dear.

My soul wants only this.
Since I lost you, I’m melting, I cry out your name with pain,

Mahdubala, Mahdubala."

Kazantzidis also referenced Madhubala in the lyrics of the song, "Arabian Bodies", which he sang alongside his first wife, Marinella.

== Release ==
"Mantoubala" was released in March 1959, shortly after "Magala". The initial 45-rpm vinyl pressing featured "Dio Portes Echi i Zoi" on its B-side, another track composed by Kazantzidis and penned by Papagianopoulou.

== Reception ==
Initially, Kazantzidis viewed "Mantoubala" as a minor track and anticipated that the single's B-side, "Dio Portes Echi i Zoi" would become the commercial hit. However, upon checking with local record vendors, Kazantzidis was told that "Mantoubala" was in high demand among record buyers.

According to Abadzi, "Mantoubala" broke the 45,000-copy record set by Manos Hatzidakis for "Garifalo st'afti", and went on to sell over 96,000 records within a year. ThePrint wrote that "Mantoubala" became the first single in the history of Greece to sell over 100,000 copies. Film scholar Dimitris Eleftheriotis cited "Mantoubala" as one of the "most commercially successful popular songs of all time".

Despite the significant revenue generated by the record sale for the Columbia record company, Kazantzidis received a payout of less than 1,000 drachmas. This discrepancy was a result of mid-20th century standard contract procedures in Greece, where session performers were compensated with lump-sum fees rather than royalty percentages tied to sales numbers.

Kazantzidis and his friend decided to name their club "Mantoubala" following the song's success, believing that the name would function as a "crowd-puller".

== Adaptations ==
"Mantoubala" became a hit in Israel, where it was regularly performed by musician Aris San.

In 1965, the Israeli comedy group HaGashash HaHiver recorded a humorous Hebrew contrafactum (adaptation) of the song titled "Ma sheba la" ("Whatever she feels like doing"), featuring lyrics written by Yossi Gamzo. On the original printing of the HaGashash HaHiver LP album sleeve, the composition credit was attributed to Manos Hatzidakis instead of Kazantzidis.

== The Return of Mantoubala ==
In 1964, Kazantzidis released a sequel duet (with Marinella) titled "The Return of Mantoubala". The track notably opens with an alap (an introductory improvisational passage in Hindustani classical music).

== Legacy ==
Vocalists Antonis Remos and Anna Vissi performed a live rendition of "Mantoubala" during the closing ceremony of the 2004 Summer Olympics in Athens.

== Sources ==
- Abadzi, Helen (1967). Indoprepōn apokalypsē apo tēn India tou exōtesmou stē laikē mousa tōn Hellēnōn (in Greek). Atrapos. ISBN 9789607412775.
- Erez, Oded (2016). Becoming Mediterranean: Greek Popular Music and Ethno-Class Politics in Israel, 1952–1982 (PhD). University of California, Los Angeles – via eScholarship.
- Leontis, Artemis (30 April 2009). Culture and Customs of Greece. Bloomsbury Publishing USA. ISBN 978-0313342974.
- Mpalachoutis, Kostas (2003). Κι όσο υπάρχεις θα υπάρχω-- η πορεία και τα τραγούδια του Στέλιου Καζαντζίδη [As long as you exist, I will exist: The journey and songs of Stelios Kazantzidis] (in Greek). Atrapos. ISBN 978-9608325265.
