= Awaara =

1951 film by Raj Kapoor

- Directed by: Raj Kapoor
- Written by: Khwaja Ahmad Abbas
- Screenplay by: Khwaja Ahmad Abbas
- Story by: Khwaja Ahmad Abbas; V.P. Sathe
- Produced by: Raj Kapoor
- Starring: Prithviraj Kapoor; Raj Kapoor; Nargis; Leela Chitnis; K. N. Singh; Shashi Kapoor
- Cinematography: Radhu Karmakar
- Edited by: G.G. Mayekar
- Music by: Shankar–Jaikishan
- Production companies: All India Film Corporation; R.K. Films
- Distributed by: R.K. Films
- Release date: 14 December 1951
- Running time: 168 minutes
- Country: India
- Language: Hindustani
- Box office: est. ₹15.6 crore

Awaara (1951)

Awaara, also written Awāra (Note: Hindi: आवारा, Urdu: آوارہ, romanized: Āvārā) and known overseas as The Vagabond, is a 1951 Indian crime drama film, produced and directed by Raj Kapoor, and written by Khwaja Ahmad Abbas and V.P. Sathe. It stars Raj Kapoor along with his real-life father Prithviraj Kapoor, as well as Nargis, Leela Chitnis and K. N. Singh. Other members of the Kapoor family make an appearance, including Raj's youngest brother Shashi Kapoor, who plays the younger version of his character, and Prithiviraj's father Dewan Basheshwarnath Singh Kapoor, playing a cameo in his only film appearance. The film's music was composed by Shankar Jaikishan.

The film expresses socialist themes, and blends social and reformist themes with the crime, romantic comedy and musical melodrama genres. The plot centers on the intertwining lives of a poor thief Raj (played by Raj Kapoor), the privileged Rita (played by Nargis), and Judge Raghunath (played by Prithviraj Kapoor) who is unaware that Raj is his son. In the film, Kapoor's poor "little tramp" character references Charlie Chaplin and was further developed in other Kapoor films such as Shree 420. Awaara is considered a milestone in the history of Bollywood.

The film became an overnight sensation in South Asia, and found even greater success further afield in the Soviet Union, East Asia, Africa, the Caribbean, the Middle East, and Eastern Europe. In particular, the song "Awaara Hoon" ("I am a Vagabond"), sung by Mukesh with lyrics by Shailendra, became hugely popular across the Indian subcontinent, as well as in countries such as the Soviet Union, China, Bulgaria, Turkey, Afghanistan, and Romania. The film was also nominated for the Grand Prize at the Cannes Film Festival in 1953. The film is estimated to have sold over 200 million tickets overseas, including more than 100 million in China and about 100 million in the Soviet Union. Owing to its popularity in so many countries, the film is a candidate for the most successful film of all time and is considered to be one of the greatest films of all time. In 2012, Awaara was included in the 20 new entries to All-Time 100 greatest films by the Time magazine.

== Plot ==
Raghunath, a wealthy district judge who believes that "good people are born to good people, and criminals are born to criminals", convicts Jagga, son of a criminal, of rape with thin evidence. Jagga later escapes and kidnaps the judge's wife, Leela, for revenge. When Jagga finds out that Leela is pregnant, he releases her after four days and changes his plan. However, people suspect that Leela had been raped while being held captive by Jagga and Raghunath throws her out of their house, rejecting her pleas that the child is his.

Leela gives birth to Raj on the streets, and they both live in poverty. Raj befriends Rita in school. He is removed from the school rolls while trying to maintain a job as a shoeshiner, and Rita moves to another city. Jagga convinces Raj to steal in order to save his starving mother. Raj grows up into a skilled criminal, going in and out of jail, and works for Jagga's gang. Leela thinks that he is a businessman. Raj never forgets Rita, keeping her birthday picture at his home.

For a bank robbery, Jagga asks Raj to steal an automobile. He snatches a woman's purse when she steps out of the car but finds no keys. He pretends to pursue the thief in order to ward off any suspicion and returns the purse to the woman, who is charmed by his personality and apparent selflessness. Later, when Raj successfully steals a car, he hides from the police in a mansion where he meets the same woman. Seeing the same birthday picture, Raj realises that she is his school friend Rita. He tells Rita he's a thief, but his figurative statements make her think he is a finance professional. Rita, now studying law, is a ward of Raghunath, who is suspicious when he hears that Raj doesn't know who his father is. Raj and Rita fall in love. Worrying that Rita will not accept him due to his thievery, Raj starts working at a factory but is fired when the manager finds out that he was a thief.

Rita invites him to her birthday party. Raj goes back to Jagga for a loan so that he can buy a gift for her. Jagga mocks his attempts to reform and asks him to commit more crimes. Raj refuses but later steals a necklace from a man on the street, not knowing the man was Raghunath. At Rita's birthday, when Raj gives her a necklace without a case and Raghunath gives her a case without a necklace, she realises that Raj is indeed a thief. Rita goes to Raj's mother and learns his life story. She decides that Raj is not bad but was forced into committing crimes by bad influences and desperate surroundings. Raj is ashamed, still believing he is no good for her, but Rita forgives him.

Raj goes to Raghunath to ask if he can marry Rita, but the judge turns him away. Meanwhile, Jagga and the gang commit the bank robbery, but it goes wrong and they have to run from the police. Jagga hides in Raj's house, where Leela recognizes him and he attacks her. Raj enters and fights him off, killing Jagga in self-defense. Raj goes on trial for Jagga's death, with Raghunath as the judge. When Leela goes to the courthouse to provide her eyewitness account, she sees Raghunath and chases after him but is struck by a car. Rita collects the testimony from Leela in the hospital, and later Raj is allowed to visit her. Leela tells Raj that Raghunath is his father and asks her son to forgive him. Raj only becomes angry at Raghunath for making him and his mother suffer.

Raj escapes from jail and tries to kill Raghunath for revenge but is stopped by Rita. Rita defends Raj in the trial for assault, who reveals the father-son relationship. Raj chooses not to defend his actions and says that he is a bad man. He asks the court not to think of him, but the millions of other children who grow up in poverty and end up turning to crime because high society does not care about them. While he awaits his verdict, Raj is visited by Raghunath, who finally accepts that Raj is his son and tearfully asks for forgiveness. In the end, Raj is spared execution but sentenced to three years in prison for his crime. He promises that after getting released, he will reform himself for Rita, who promises to wait for him.

== Cast ==
- Prithviraj Kapoor as Judge Raghunath
- Raj Kapoor as Raj "Raju"
- Nargis as Rita
- Leela Chitnis as Leela
- K. N. Singh as Jagannath "Jagga"
- Cuckoo as Bar dancer
- B. M. Vyas as Dubey
- Leela Mishra as Raghunath's Sister-In-Law
- Shashi Kapoor as Young Raj
- Baby Zubeida as Young Rita
- Honey O'Brien as Dancer
- Dewan Basheshwarnath Singh Kapoor as Judge
- Prem Nath as the boatswain appearing in and singing the song "Naiyya Teri Manjhdhaar Hoshiyaar Hoshiyaar" with others (uncredited guest appearance)

Supporting cast

- Rajoo, Mansaram, Rajan, Manek Kapoor, Paryag, Ravi, Vinni, Bali, Shinde.

== Soundtrack ==
The music for this film was composed by Shankar–Jaikishan while the songs were written by Shailendra and Hasrat Jaipuri. The soundtrack was listed by Planet Bollywood as number 3 on their list of 100 Greatest Bollywood Soundtracks. The song "Awaara Hoon" was used in the Malayalam film Vishnulokam directed by Kamal and starring Mohanlal. Awaara was the best-selling Bollywood soundtrack album of the 1950s.

Title	Singer(s)	Lyricist	Raga
"Ek Do Teen"	Shamshad Begum	Shailendra	
"Awaara Hoon"	Mukesh	Shailendra	Bhairavi (Hindustani)
"Ghar Aaya Mera Pardesi"	Lata Mangeshkar	Shailendra	Bhairavi (Hindustani)
"Dam Bhar Jo Udhar Munh Phere"	Lata Mangeshkar, Mukesh	Shailendra	
"Tere Bina Aag Yeh Chandni"	Lata Mangeshkar, Manna Dey	Shailendra	
"Naiya Teri Manjhdhaar Hoshiyaar Hoshiyaar"	Mohammed Rafi	Shailendra	
"Julam Sahe Bhaari Janak Dulari"	Mohammed Rafi, Lata Mangeshkar	Shailendra	
"Hum Tujhse Mohabbat Kar Ke"	Mukesh	Hasrat Jaipuri	Darbari Kanada
"Ek Bewafa Se Pyar Kiya"	Lata Mangeshkar	Hasrat Jaipuri	
"Ab Raat Guzarne Wali Hai"	Lata Mangeshkar	Hasrat Jaipuri	
"Jab Se Balam Ghar Aaye"	Lata Mangeshkar	Hasrat Jaipuri	Kafi (raga)

== Production ==
The film is a collaboration of the famous team of director/producer Raj Kapoor and writer Khwaja Ahmad Abbas. Abbas originally wanted Mehboob Khan to direct the film, but the two disagreed over the casting. Khan wanted Ashok Kumar to play the judge and Dilip Kumar the son. In the event, Abbas withdrew his script from Mehboob Studios and Raj Kapoor decided to direct it. This film was filmed in RK Studio and Bombay.

In his column for the Indian Express, Kapoor wrote, "In Awara I tried to prove that Vagabonds are not born, but are created in the slums of our modern cities, in the midst of dire poverty and evil environment."

== Critical reception ==
It was entered in the 1953 Cannes Film Festival, where it was nominated for the Grand Prize of the Festival (Palme d'Or). In 1955, it was voted the best film of the year by readers of Turkish daily Milliyet.

In 2003, Time magazine included it in a list of "10 Indian Films to Treasure". Time magazine also chose Raj Kapoor's performance in Awaara as one of the top ten greatest performances of all time. In 2005, Indiatimes Movies ranked the movie amongst the "Top 25 Must See Bollywood Films", writing: "Whenever Raj Kapoor and Nargis came together on screen, sparks flew. Their chemistry was electrifying and it crackles with raw passion in Raj Kapoor's Awaara. Nargis's wild and carefree sensuality pulsates and Raj Kapoor's scruffy hair-rebellious persona only adds fuel to the fire". Time magazine included the film among the 20 new entries added to All-Time 100 greatest films in 2012.

== Box office ==
Worldwide gross (est.)
Territory	Gross revenue	Inflation-adjusted gross revenue (2016)	Footfalls (ticket sales)
India	₹23 million ($4.83 million) (Note: 4.7619 Indian rupees per US dollar from 1950 to 1965)	$60 million (₹3.02 billion)	30 million
Turkey	Unknown	Unknown	100,000 (opening)
Soviet Union	37.75 million руб – $16.97 million (₹80.8 million)	$146 million (₹9.12 billion)	100 million
Initial run (1954)	29 million Rbls – $7.25 million (Note: 4 Rbls per US$ from 1950 to 1960) (₹34.5 million)	$87 million (₹4.37 billion)	65 million
Re-runs (1955–1966)	8.75 million Rbls (Note: 35 million re-run admissions up until 1964-1966, average Soviet ticket price of 25 kopecks in the mid-1960s) – $9.72 million (Note: 0.9 руб per US$ from 1961 to 1971) (₹46.3 million)	$96 million (₹7.05 billion)	35 million
China	CN¥14.8 million – $8.86 million (₹72.2 million)	$41 million (₹2.67 billion)	100 million
Initial release (1955)	CN¥2.8 million – $1.14 million (₹54 lakh)	$14 million (₹1,353 million)	40 million
Re-release (1978)	CN¥12 million – $7.72 million (₹62.7 million)	$38 million (₹3.67 billion)	60 million
Worldwide	₹156.1 million ($30.66 million)	$232 million (₹14.81 billion)	230.1 million

In India, the film grossed a record of ₹2.1 crore in 1951, making it the highest-grossing film in India up until that time. This record was later beaten the next year by Mehboob Khan's Aan (1952), starring Dilip Kumar, which grossed ₹2.5 crore in 1952.

In Turkey, Awaara released in 1955. The film sold 100,000 tickets in its first week of release in Turkey. The total number of box office admissions in Turkey is currently unknown.

=== Soviet Union ===
In the Soviet Union, Awaara was released in 1954, debuting at Indian film festivals in Moscow and Leningrad which drew about 1.5 million viewers in four days. By the end of the year, it drew an audience of about 64 million viewers in its initial run, the highest for any film in the Soviet Union at the time, until its record was surpassed by Amphibian Man in 1962. At the Soviet box office, Awaara remained the most-viewed Indian film, the third biggest foreign hit of all time, and one of the top 20 biggest hits of all time.

In terms of gross revenue, Awaara earned 29 million Rbls ($7.25 million, ₹34.5 million) in its initial run, surpassing Aan to become the highest-grossing Indian film overseas at the time. Awaara's 29 million руб was eventually surpassed by Disco Dancer (1982), which grossed 60 million руб in the Soviet Union. Including re-runs, which were running for 10–12 years, Awaara's footfalls in the Soviet Union amounted to about 100 million box office admissions, which remains among the highest for an Indian film in an overseas market.

=== China ===
The film was also a success in China, where it first released in 1955. In its opening week, the film sold 4 million tickets, including 1.43 million admissions earning a distribution rental income of about CN¥100,000 in Beijing alone. Its 4 million opening-week ticket sales were equivalent to estimated opening-week rentals of approximately CN¥280,000 ($114,000). Prior to its 1978 re-release, the film's initial run had sold a total of 40 million tickets in China.

The film's 1978 re-release was a greater commercial success in China. Following its re-release, the film went on to sell a total of more than 100 million tickets,

== Legacy ==
The song "Awaara Hoon" and actor Raj Kapoor were widely known across China and the Soviet Union. The film's success in both the Soviet Union and China has been attributed to the socialist themes expressed in the film.

Awaara also earned significant popularity in Greece, where it was released locally as The Vagabond of Bombay. One song from the film, "Aajao Tadapte Hain Armaan" ("Ab Raat Guzarne Wali Hai") was adapted by Greek musician Stelios Kazantzidis and produced into the hit, "Mantoubala" (1959).

The film Awaara and the song "Awaara Hoon" are believed to have been among Chairman Mao's favourite films and songs, respectively. Awaara was referenced in the 2000 Chinese film Platform.

In 2023, Time Out ranked it #20 on its list of the "100 Best Bollywood Movies."

=== Remakes ===
Due to the film's remarkable success with Turkish audiences, Awaara was remade in Turkey a total of eight times. The first and most prominent Turkish film remake was Avare (1964) starring actor Sadri Alışık and actress Ajda Pekkan, another Turkish remake was Benim Gibi Sevenler (1977) by Temel Gürsu.

There was also an Iranian film remake, called The Wheel of the Universe (1967). However, this version may have been a remake of the Turkish remake Avare, rather than a direct remake of the original Awaara.

== See also ==
- List of films directed by Raj Kapoor
- List of films by box office admissions
- List of highest-grossing films in the Soviet Union
- List of highest-grossing Indian films
- List of highest-grossing Indian films in overseas markets
- List of highest-grossing non-English films

== Bibliography ==
- Khwaja Ahmad Abbas; Vasant Sathe; Suhail Akhtar; Vijay Jani; Nasreen Munni Kabir (2010). The Dialogue of Awaara: Raj Kapoor's Immortal Classic. Niyogi Books. ISBN 978-81-89738-54-9.
