= Stalia – Stalia =

Studio album by Marinella
- Released: 17 January 1969
- Recorded: Athens, 1967 – 1968, studio Polysound
- Genre: World music; Folk; Modern Laika
- Length: 33:58
- Language: Greek
- Label: PolyGram Greece; Philips
- Producer: PolyGram Records

Marinella chronology
Anapolontas (1967)	Stalia – Stalia (1969)	Kazantzidis & Marinella (1969)

Stalia – stalia (Greek: Σταλιά – σταλιά; Drop by drop) is the name of the first solo studio album by Greek singer Marinella, after divorcing Stelios Kazantzidis. It was released on 17 January 1969 by PolyGram Records in Greece and all songs were released on 45 rpm vinyl records in 1967–68. This album was issued in mono and stereo. The stereo version of this album was released on CD in August, 1993 by PolyGram.

== Track listing ==
Side one.

1. "Stalia – stalia" (Σταλιά – σταλιά; Drop by drop) – (Giorgos Zampetas – Dionisis Tzefronis) – 3:23
  - This song had been released as a single on 11 March 1968.
2. "Piso apo tis kalamies" (Πίσω από τις καλαμιές; Behind the reeds) – (Giorgos Katsaros – Pythagoras) – 2:37
  - This song had been released as a single on 21 December 1967.
3. "Tora pou irthe i stigmi" (Τώρα που ήρθε η στιγμή; Now that the moment came) – (Nakis Petridis – Sevi Tiliakou) – 3:01
  - This song had been released as a single on 9 October 1968.
4. "I antres den klene" (Οι άντρες δεν κλαίνε; Men don't cry) – (Giorgos Katsaros – Pythagoras) – 3:12
  - This song had been released as a single on 16 February 1968.
5. "Pios in' aftos" (Ποιος είν' αυτός; Who is this guy?) – (Giorgos Zampetas – Pythagoras) – 3:10
  - This song had been released as a single on 30 November 1968.
6. "Ama dite to feggari" (Άμα δείτε το φεγγάρι; Should you see the moon) – (Mimis Plessas – Lefteris Papadopoulos) – 2:38
  - This song had been released as a single on 28 November 1968.

Side two.

1. "Anixe petra (na kleisto)" (Άνοιξε πέτρα; Open, stone) – (Mimis Plessas – Lefteris Papadopoulos) – 3:29
  - This song had been released as a single on 28 November 1968.
2. "Pira tou dromous" (Πήρα τους δρόμους; I took the streets) – (Giorgos Zampetas – Dimitris Christodoulou) – 2:42
  - This song had been released as a single on 11 March 1968.
3. "O Kolonakiotis" (Ο Κολωνακιώτης; The boy from Kolonaki) – (Nakis Petridis – Sevi Tiliakou) – 2:35
  - This song had been released as a single on 9 October 1968.
4. "Kleo kathe Kyriaki" (Κλαίω κάθε Κυριακή; I cry every Sunday) – (Giorgos Katsaros – Pythagoras) – 2:48
  - This song had been released as a single on 21 December 1967.
5. "Echo stin porta ta klidia" (Έχω στην πόρτα τα κλειδιά; I have the keys in the door) – (Vaggelis Pitsiladis – Lefteris Papadopoulos) – 3:24
  - This song had been released as a single on 22 February 1968.
6. "Glikocharazi, xipnise" – (Γλυκοχαράζει, ξύπνησε; The sweet dawn comes, wake up) – (Giorgos Zampetas – Charalampos Vasiliadis) – 2:59
  - This song had been released as a single on 30 November 1968.

== Personnel ==
- Marinella – vocals, background vocals
- Giorgos Zampetas – arranger and conductor on tracks 1, 5, 8 and 12
- Giorgos Katsaros – arranger and conductor on tracks 2, 4 and 10
- Mimis Plessas – arranger and conductor on tracks 6 and 7
- Nakis Petridis – arranger and conductor on tracks 3 and 9
- Vaggelis Pitsiladis – arranger and conductor on "Echo stin porta ta klidia"
- PolyGram Records – producer
