= I zoi mou oli =

"I zoi mou oli" (Greek: Η ζωή μου όλη) is a well known song of Akis Panou (Greek: Άκης Πάνου) who wrote the music and the lyrics. Stelios Kazantzidis was the first singer of the song 1974. The title of song can be translated in English as "My entire life".

Stelios Kazantzidis interviewed by Giorgos Lianis stated that even if it was difficult to make a choice between his songs considered "I zoi mou oli" as one of his finest songs.

== Lyrics ==
My entire life is a responsibility
it takes everything from me, it gives [me] nothing
my entire life is a furnace
in which I have fallen and cooks me slowly

My entire life, a foolery
my only property
my entire life is a self-sacrifice
which has neither meaning nor purpose

My entire life is a cigarette
which I don't appreciate, yet I smoke
and when it becomes a dogend, I'll offer it to Death
when the time comes for me to meet him

— Singer: Stelios Kazantzidis, Songwriter: Akis Panou, Composer: Akis Panou
