= Kazantzidis & Marinella – Megales Epitihies =

Studio album by Stelios Kazantzidis & Marinella
- Released: 1964
- Recorded: Athens, 1964
- Genre: World music; Folk; Laïko
- Language: Greek
- Label: Odeon; Minos EMI
- Producer: Minos EMI

Stelios Kazantzidis chronology
Kazantzidis (1958)	Kazantzidis & Marinella – Megales Epitihies (1964)	Tragoudiste Mazi Mou (1965)

Marinella chronology
Kazantzidis & Marinella – Megales Epitihies (1964) (1964)	Chrysos Diskos Kazantzidi & Marinellas (1965)

Kazantzidis & Marinella – Megales Epitihies (Greek: Καζαντζίδης & Μαρινέλλα – Μεγάλες Επιτυχίες; The great hits of Kazantzidis and Marinella) is the name of a studio album by Greek singers Stelios Kazantzidis and Marinella. It is their first joint studio album and was released in 1964 by Odeon/Minos EMI in Greece. All songs were released on 45 rpm vinyl records in 1964–65.

== Track listing ==
Side one.

1. "Ta moutzouromena cheria" (Τα μουτζουρωμένα χέρια; Soiled hands) – (Stelios Kazantzidis – Stefanos Vartanis)
2. "Dichos filous, dichos mana" (Δίχως φίλους, δίχως μάνα; Without friends and mother) – (Kazantzidis – Kostas Psichogios)
3. "Papoutsi apo ton topo sou" (Παπούτσι από τον τόπο σου; A shoe from your place) – (Theodoros Derveniotis – Kostas Virvos)
4. "Osi glika echoun ta chili sou" (Όση γλύκα έχουν τα χείλη σου; The sweetness of your lips) – (Apostolos Kaldaras)
5. "Mi kles glikia manoula mou" (Μη κλαις γλυκιά μανούλα μου; Don't cry, my sweet mother) – (Stelios Kazantzidis – Ioannis Vassilopoulos)
6. "Svise to fos" (Σβήσε το φως; Turn off the light) – (Theodoros Derveniotis – Kostas Virvos)

Side two.

1. "Ta chili sou osa ki' an poun" (Τα χείλη σου όσα κι αν πουν; Whatever your lips may say) – (Mpampis Mpakalis – Stavros Kaxos)
2. "Niotho mia kourasi varia" (Νιώθω μια κούραση βαριά; I feel very tired) – (Stelios Kazantzidis – Ioannis Vassilopoulos)
3. "Ap' ta cheria mou s' arpazoun" (Απ' τα χέρια μου σ' αρπάζουν; They grabbed you out of my hands) – (Mpampis Mpakalis – Panagiotis Tzochaderos)
4. "Ki' an gelao ine psema" (Κι αν γελάω είναι ψέμα; If I laugh it's a lie) – (Stelios Kazantzidis – Evaggelos Atraidis)
5. "To treno Germanias – Athinon" (Το τρένο Γερμανίας – Αθηνών; The Germany-Athens train) – (Stelios Kazantzidis)
6. "Aponi zoi" (Άπονη ζωή; Heartless life) – (Stavros Xarchakos – Lefteris Papadopoulos)

== Personnel ==
- Stelios Kazantzidis – vocals
- Marinella – vocals, background vocals
- Mpampis Mpakalis – arranger and conductor on tracks 7 and 9
- Theodoros Derveniotis – arranger and conductor on tracks 3 and 6
- Stelios Kazantzidis – arranger and conductor on tracks 1, 2, 5, 8, 10 and 11
- Apostolos Kaldaras – arranger and conductor on "Osi glika echoun ta chili sou"
- Stavros Xarchakos – arranger and conductor on "Aponi zoi"
- Karapatsopoulos Photography – photographer
- Minos EMI – producer
