= Marinella (1969 album) =

Studio album by Marinella
- Released: 1969
- Recorded: Athens, 1965 – 1967
- Genre: World music; folk; Modern Laika
- Length: 30:08
- Language: Greek
- Label: Margophone; Minos EMI
- Producer: Minos EMI

Marinella chronology
Otan Simani Esperinos (1969)	Marinella (1969)	Ena Tragoudi Ein' I Zoi Mou (1970)

Marinella (Greek: Μαρινέλλα) is the name of a self-titled album by Greek singer Marinella. It was released in 1969 by Margophone/Minos EMI in Greece and all songs were released on 45 rpm vinyl records in 1965–67.

== Track listing ==
Side one.

1. "Apopse hano mia psychi" (Απόψε χάνω μια ψυχή; Tonight I'm losing a soul) – (Giorgos Katsaros – Pythagoras) – 3:07
  - This song had been released as a single in 1966.
2. "Floges akoumpisan ton ourano" (Φλόγες ακούμπησαν τον ουρανό; Flames touched the sky) – (Aggelos Sempos – Lefteris Papadopoulos) – 2:20
  - This song had been released as a single in 1966.
3. "Kitaxe me mia stigmi" (Κοίταξέ με μια στιγμή; Look at me for a moment) – (Aggelos Sempos – Lefteris Papadopoulos) – 2:31
  - This song had been released as a single in 1966.
4. "Thalassa mou" (Θάλασσα μου; My sea) – (Mimis Plessas – Akos Daskalopoulos) – 2:16
  - This song had been released as a single in 1966.
5. "Apopse pou malosame" (Απόψε που μαλώσαμε; Tonight that we had a fight) – (Makis Tzortzatos – Pythagoras) – 2:49
  - This song had been released as a single in 1967.
6. "Eklapsa hthes" (Έκλαψα χθες; I cried yesterday) – (Mimis Plessas – Akos Daskalopoulos) – 2:41
  - This song had been released as a single in 1966.

Side two.

1. "Ta pallikaria" (Τα παλικάρια; The lads) – (Yannis Markopoulos – Akos Daskalopoulos) – 2:18
  - This song had been released as a single in 1965.
2. "Sta matia sou gennithikan" (Στα μάτια σου γεννήθηκαν; In your eyes were born) – (Yannis Markopoulos – Akos Daskalopoulos) – 2:59
  - This song had been released as a single in 1965.
3. "Sti yeitonia" (Στη γειτονιά; In the neighborhood) – (Aggelos Sempos – Lefteris Papadopoulos) – 2:48
  - This song had been released as a single in 1965.
4. "Ase me na s' agapiso" (Άσε με να σ' αγαπήσω; Let me love you) – (Aggelos Sempos – Lefteris Papadopoulos) – 2:49
  - This song had been released as a single in 1966.
5. "Ola ta gkremises" (Όλα τα γκρέμισες; You tear them all down) – (Makis Tzortzatos) – 3:12
  - This song had been released as a single in 1967.
6. "Klise ta matia sou, kardia mou" (Κλείσε τα μάτια σου, καρδιά μου; Close your eyes, my heart) – (Giorgos Katsaros – Pythagoras) – 2:58
  - This song had been released as a single in 1966.

== Personnel ==
- Marinella – vocals
- Marios Kostoglou – background vocals on tracks 1 and 2
- Giorgos Katsaros – arranger and conductor on tracks 1 and 12
- Mimis Plessas – arranger and conductor on tracks 4 and 6
- Yannis Markopoulos – arranger and conductor on tracks 7 and 8
- Aggelos Sempos – arranger and conductor on tracks 2, 3, 9 and 10
- Makis Tzortzatos – arranger and conductor on tracks 5 and 11
- Romilos Parisis – photographer
- Minos EMI – producer
