= Otan Simani Esperinos =

Studio album by Marinella
- Released: 6 September 1969
- Recorded: Athens, 1968 – 1969, studio Polysound
- Genre: World music; Folk; Modern Laika
- Length: 34:33
- Language: Greek
- Label: PolyGram Greece; Philips
- Producer: PolyGram Records

Marinella chronology
Kazantzidis & Marinella (1969)	Otan Simani Esperinos (1969)	Marinella (1969)

Otan simani Esperinos (Greek: Όταν σημάνει Εσπερινός; When the evening bells are ringing) is the name of a studio album by Greek singer Marinella. It was released on 6 September 1969 by PolyGram Records in Greece and all songs were released on 45 rpm vinyl records in 1968–69. This album was issued in mono and stereo. The stereo version of this album was released on CD in 1993 with six bonus tracks by PolyGram.

== Track listing ==
Side one.

1. "Apopse se thelo" (Απόψε σε θέλω; Tonight I want you) – (Mimis Plessas – Lefteris Papadopoulos) – 3:51
  - This song had been released as a single on 7 July 1969.
2. "An m' agapas ki an s' agapo" (Αν μ' αγαπάς κι αν σ' αγαπώ; If you love me and if I love you) – (Nakis Petridis) – 3:14
  - This song had been released as a single on 15 February 1969.
3. "Ti na ftei" (Τι να φταίει; What is wrong) – (Giorgos Zampetas – Dimitris Christodoulou) – 3:05
  - This song had been released as a single on 10 June 1969.
4. "Anthismenes vissinies" (Ανθισμένες βυσσινιές; Blooming cherry trees) – (Giorgos Katsaros – Pythagoras) – 4:04
  - This song had been released as a single on 9 December 1968.
5. "Fyge na vris ti mira sou" (Φύγε να βρεις τη μοίρα σου; Choose your fate) – (Tolis Voskopoulos – Ilias Lymperopoulos) – 2:57
  - This song had been released as a single on 7 July 1969.
6. "Ta pikramena dilina" (Τα πικραμένα δειλινά; The bitter evenings) – (Giorgos Zampetas – Napoleon Eleftheriou) – 2:48
  - This song had been released as a single on 10 June 1969.

Side two.

1. "Otan simani Esperinos" (Όταν σημάνει Εσπερινός; When the Vesper bells are ringing) – (Nakis Petridis – Sevi Tiliakou) – 3:05
  - This song had been released as a single on 15 February 1969.
2. "T' agrioperistera" (Τ' αγριοπερίστερα; The wild pigeons) – (Giorgos Katsaros – Pythagoras) – 2:44
  - This song had been released as a single on 9 December 1968.
3. "Stathmi ke limania" (Σταθμοί και λιμάνια; Railroad stations and ports) – (Nantia Panagou – Giorgos Mammos) – 2:53
  - This song had been released as a single on 3 September 1968.
4. "To veloudenio sou to yelekaki" (Το βελουδένιο σου το γελεκάκι; Your velvet vest) – (Mimis Plessas – Lefteris Papadopoulos) – 2:52
  - This song had been released as a single on 7 July 1969.
5. "Dio nichtes" (Δυο νύχτες; Two nights) – (Tolis Voskopoulos – Ilias Lymperopoulos) – 2:52
  - This song had been released as a single on 7 July 1969.
6. "Min to pistepsis" (Μην το πιστέψεις; Don't believe it) – (Nakis Petridis – Sevi Tiliakou) – 2:48
  - This song had been released as a single on 3 September 1968.

Bonus tracks on the CD re-issue.

1. "Mi mou zitas na 'rtho" (Μη μου ζητάς να 'ρθω; Don't ask me to come) – (Vaggelis Pitsiladis – Chrysafenia Evaggelinidou) – 3:21
  - This song had been released as a single on 7 May 1968.
2. "Dixe mou to dromo" (Δείξε μου το δρόμο; Show me the road) – (Vaggelis Pitsiladis – Chrysafenia Evaggelinidou) – 3:03
  - This song had been released as a single on 7 May 1968.
3. "Fteo, ego gia ola fteo" (Φταίω, εγώ για όλα φταίω; I'm to blame for everything) – (Giorgos Manisalis – Athanasios Papoutsis) – 3:18
  - This song had been released as a single on 20 August 1968.
4. "Aplose ta dio sou cheria" (Άπλωσε τα δυο σου χέρια; Stretch out your two arms) feat. Marios Kostoglou – (Giorgos Manisalis – Athanasios Papoutsis) – 2:49
  - This song had been released as a single on 20 August 1968.
5. "Kato sta lemonadika" (Κάτω στα λεμονάδικα; Down the lemon-shops) – (Giorgos Katsaros – Pythagoras) – 2:37
  - This song had been released as a single on 6 March 1968.
6. "Pallikaraki mou chlomo" (Παλικαράκι μου χλωμό; My pale lad) – (Giorgos Katsaros – Pythagoras) – 3:09
  - This song had been released as a single on 6 March 1968.

== Personnel ==
- Marinella – vocals, background vocals
- PolyGram Records – producer
