= De Tha Xanagapiso =

"De Tha Xanagapiso" (Greek: Δε Θα Ξαναγαπήσω) is a song performed by Stelios Kazantzidis. The lyrics are written by Lefteris Papadopoulos and music is composed by Manos Loizos. The English translation of the title is "I Shall not Love Again".

== Lyrics ==
My share of joy
is taken from me by others
because I had pure hands
and a great heart

My god, the second time
that I will come to live
however much my heart yearns
I shall not love again

Like a sea-beaten ship's hull
like a cracked rock
I came into life as a stranger
and as a stranger I will leave again

— Singer: Stelios Kazantzidis, Songwriter: Lefteris Papadopoulos, Composer: Manos Loizos
