= Eftychia Papagianopoulou =

Greek lyricist (1893–1972)

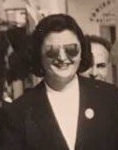
Eftychia Papagianopoulou

Eftychia Papagianopoulou (Greek: Ευτυχία Παπαγιαννοπούλου; 1893 – 7 January 1972), better known simply as Eftychia, was a Greek lyricist.

== Biography ==
She was born in Aydın near Smyrne (modern day İzmir) in Asia Minor, then ruled by the Ottoman Empire in 1893. She left İzmir in 1919 prior to the Greco-Turkish War. She emigrated to Greece and settled permanently in Athens.

She wrote the lyrics to many popular Greek songs, collaborating with composers like Vassilis Tsitsanis, Apostolos Kaldaras and Manos Hadjidakis; however, she did not achieve major fame until her death in 1972. Her great contribution to Greek music through her exceptional ability in lyricism was not broadly known and recognized, although many of the successful songs of the 1950s and 1960s had been written by her.

She died in 1972 in Athens.

== Legacy ==
In 2002, a book published by lyricist and journalist Lefteris Papadopoulos, who was a friend of Eftychia during the last years of her life, helped to increase recognition for her work.

In 2019, her life was made into a film titled after her name (Eftychia) and directed by Angelos Frantzis.

== Compositions ==
Many well-known songs have lyrics by Eftychia, including:

- Ta kavourakia (The little crabs), music: Vassilis Tsitsanis
- Dio portes echi i zoi (Life has two doors), music: Stelios Kazantzidis
- Ta alania (The gutter children), music: Vassilis Tsitsanis
- Ime aetos horis ftera (I am an eagle without wings), music: Manos Hadjidakis
- Pira ap ti nioti hromata (I took colours from youth), music: Apostolos Kaldaras
- Malamo, music: Stamatis Kraounakis
- Mi me paratas (Don't leave me), music: Apostolos Kaldaras
- An mou spasoun to bouzouki (If they break my bouzouki), music: George Zambetas
- Mantoubala, music: Stelios Kazantzidis

== Sources ==
- Lefteris Papadopoulos (2002), Ola ine ena psema, Kastaniotis Editions; Athens.
