= Ena Tragoudi In' I Zoi Mou =

Studio album by Marinella
- Released: 27 March 1970
- Recorded: Athens, 1969 – 1970, studio Polysound
- Genre: World music; Folk; Modern Laika
- Length: 33:17
- Language: Greek
- Label: PolyGram Greece; Philips
- Producer: PolyGram Records

Marinella chronology
Marinella (1969)	Ena Tragoudi In' I Zoi Mou (1970)	Kazantzidis – Marinella Sing Greek Songs (1970)

Singles from Ena tragoudi in' i zoi mou
- 1. "Pali tha klapso/Kimithike o kalos mou" Released: 5 December 1969

Ena tragoudi in' i zoi mou (Greek: Ένα τραγούδι είν' η ζωή μου; A song is my life ) is a studio album by Greek singer Marinella. It was released on 27 March 1970 by PolyGram Records in Greece. This album was issued in mono and stereo. The stereo version of this album was released on CD in August 1994 with six bonus tracks and new cover by PolyGram.

== Track listing ==
Side one.

1. "Pali tha klapso" (Πάλι θα κλάψω; I will cry) – (Nakis Petridis – Sevi Tiliakou) – 3:09
2. "Ti vradia mou apopse" (Τη βραδιά μου απόψε; My evening, tonight) – (Giannis Spanos – Alekos Sakellarios) – 2:26
3. "Kane kardia mou ipomoni" (Κάνε καρδιά μου υπομονή; Have courage, my heart) – (Giorgos Zampetas – Charalampos Vasiliadis) – 2:38
4. "Zografismena sto charti" (Ζωγραφισμένα στο χαρτί; Drawings on paper) – (Mimis Plessas – Akos Daskalopoulos) – 2:27
5. "Kimithike o kalos mou" (Κοιμήθηκε ο καλός μου; My lover, has slept) – (Nakis Petridis – Sevi Tiliakou) – 2:54
6. "Chthes arga" (Χθες αργά; Late last night) – (Giannis Spanos – Kostas Kotoulas) – 3:13

Side two.

1. "Me pnigi touti i siopi" (Με πνίγει τούτη η σιωπή; This silence suffocates me) – (Giannis Spanos – Kostas Kotoulas) – 3:20
2. "Afimofengato svismeno" (Ασημοφέγγαρο σβησμένο; Blotted out silver moon) – (Stelios Zafeiriou – Sevi Tiliakou) – 2:51
3. "Mavrontymenos in' apopse o ouranos" (Μαυροντυμένος είν' απόψε ο ουρανός; The sky is robed in black tonight) – (Stelios Zafeiriou – Christos Rouhitsas) – 2:54
4. "Se kartero" (Σε καρτερώ; I'm waiting for you) – (Giorgos Zampetas – Charalampos Vasiliadis) – 3:13
5. "T' athanato nero" (Τ' αθάνατο νερό; The immortal water) – (Mimis Plessas – Akos Daskalopoulos) – 3:22
6. "O Nontas" (Ο Νώντας; Nondas) – (Giannis Spanos – Sotia Tsotou) – 2:50

Bonus tracks on the CD re-issue.

1. "Sti diastavrosi tou dromou" (Στη διασταύρωση του δρόμου; At the junction) – (Theodoros Derveniotis – Kostas Virvos) – 2:44
  - This song had been released as a single on 26 August 1970.
2. "Dose mou ti floga sou" (Δώσε μου τη φλόγα σου; Give me your flame) – (Theodoros Derveniotis – Kostas Virvos) – 3:09
  - This song had been released as a single on 26 August 1970.
3. "Piretos (Kathe gnorimia)" (Πυρετός; Fever) – (Akis Panou) – 2:45
  - This song had been released as a single on 13 April 1971. A live version appears on Mia Vradia Me Tin Marinella.
4. "Kita me sta matia" (Κοίτα με στα μάτια; Look me in the eyes) – (Akis Panou) – 3:15
  - This song had been released as a single on 13 April 1971.
5. "Akouste" (Ακούστε; Harken) – (Giorgos Katsaros – Pythagoras) – 2:54
  - This song had been released as a single on 12 January 1972. A live version appears on Mia Vradia Me Tin Marinella.
6. "Oute matia dakrismena" (Ούτε μάτια δακρυσμένα; Eyes without tears) – (Giorgos Katsaros – Pythagoras) – 3:09
  - This song had been released as a single on 12 January 1972. A live version appears on Mia Vradia Me Tin Marinella.

== Personnel ==
- Marinella – vocals, background vocals
- Marios Kostoglou – background vocals on "Dose mou ti floga sou", "Akouste" and "Oute matia dakrismena"
- Romilos Parisis – photographer
- PolyGram Records – producer
