= Nea Ionia (song) =

"Nea Ionia" "Νέα Ιωνία"

Song by Stelios Kazantzidis

from the album Vraduazei
- Released: 1992
- Genre: World music; Folk; Laïko; Zeibekiko
- Length: 2:50
- Label: MBI (Music Box International)
- Songwriter(s): Pythagoras Papastamatiou

"Nea Ionia" (Greek: Νέα Ιωνία) is a song performed by Greek singer Stelios Kazantzidis. The lyrics are by Pythagoras (Greek: Πυθαγόρας Παπασταματίου) and the music is by Christos Nikolopoulos.

The song was released in 1992 on the album Vradiazei. The song was written about 20 years before its release but was not recorded until 1992 because Kazantzidis took a leave from recording in 1975 due to issues with his recording label Minos EMI, which he accused of binding him with an abusive and unfair contract. The song shares the name and is dedicated to northern suburb of Athens Nea Ionia, where Kazantzidis was born and lived for many years of his life.
