= Gia Proti Fora =

Studio album by Marinella
- Released: 27 May 1997
- Recorded: Athens, 1997, studio City
- Genre: World music; Folk; Pop; Modern Laika
- Length: 35:37
- Language: Greek
- Label: BMG Greece; RCA
- Producer: BMG Greece

Marinella chronology
I Marinella Tragouda Mimi Plessa & Gianni Spano (1996)	Gia Proti Fora (1997)	I Marinella Tragouda Ke Thimate (1998)

Gia proti fora (Greek: Για πρώτη φορά; English: For the first time) is the name of a studio album by Greek singer Marinella. The album was entirely composed by Stefanos Korkolis, with lyrics by Anta Douka, Philippos Grapsas and Panos Falaras. It was released on 27 May 1997 in Greece and Cyprus by BMG Greece. This album was issued in mono and stereo. The stereo version of this album was released on CD at the same time.

== Track listing ==
Side one.

1. "Afierono" (Αφιερώνω; I dedicate) – (Lyrics by Philippos Grapsas) – 4:32
2. "Vasanismeni Kyriaki" (Βασανισμένη Κυριακή; Tormented Sunday) – (Lyrics by Anta Douka) – 4:26
3. "Pes" (Πες; Say) – (Lyrics by Anta Douka) – 2:36
4. "Gia proti fora" (Για πρώτη φορά; For the first time) in duet with Stefanos Korkolis – (Lyrics by Anta Douka) – 4:33
5. "Ela apopse san Vardaris" (Έλα απόψε σαν Βαρδάρης; Come tonight like Vardares wind) – (Lyrics by Panos Falaras) – 3:15

Side two.

1. "Doxa to Theo" (Δόξα τω Θεώ; Thank God) – (Lyrics by Philippos Grapsas) – 3:24
2. "Methismeno karavi" (Μεθυσμένο καράβι; A drunken boat) – (Lyrics by Panos Falaras) – 2:59
3. "San na 'tan chtes" (Σαν να 'ταν χθες; Like it was yesterday) – (Lyrics by Anta Douka) – 3:57
4. "Opou ki an psaksis" (Όπου κι αν ψάξεις; Wherever you search) – (Lyrics by Anta Douka) – 4:30
5. "Nichta sto Buenos Aires" (Νύχτα στο Μπουένος Άιρες; A night in Buenos Aires) – (Lyrics by Anta Douka) – 3:25

== Music videos ==
- "Vasanismeni Kyriaki" - Director: Manos Adamakis
- "Ela apopse san Vardaris" - Director: Kostas Kapetanidis

== Personnel ==
- Marinella - vocals, background vocals
- Stefanos Korkolis - vocals, arranger, conductor
- BMG Greece - producer
- Philippos Papatheodorou - art direction
- Yiannis Tountas - recording engineer
- Dinos Diamantopoulos - photographer
- Achilleas Haritos - make-up artist
- Konstantinos Savakis - hair stylist
- Thanos Spyropoulos - artwork
