= Vishnulokam =

- Directed by: Kamal
- Written by: T. A. Razzaq
- Produced by: Sanal Kumar; G. Suresh Kumar
- Starring: Mohanlal; Urvashi; Shanthi Krishna
- Cinematography: Saloo George
- Edited by: K. Rajagopal
- Music by: Raveendran; Johnson (Score)
- Production company: Sooryodaya Creations
- Distributed by: Shirdi Sai Release
- Release date: 11 April 1991
- Country: India
- Language: Malayalam

Vishnulokam (transl. Realm of Vishnu) is a 1991 Indian Malayalam-language romantic drama film directed by Kamal, written by T. A. Razzaq, and produced by Sanal Kumar and G. Suresh Kumar. The film stars Mohanlal, Shanthi Krishna, Urvashi, and Murali. The songs featured in the film were composed by Raveendran, while Johnson provided the background score. The film was a commercial success at the box office.

== Plot ==
Govindan Aashaan, Kumari Kasthuri, Tharakan, and Bheemarajan reach a village as part of their street circus troupe but their main performer, Sankunni, reaches there only later. Sankunni sees Savithrikutty and falls in love. The evil landlord, Prathapa Varma, has an eye on Savithrikutty. Sankunni asks Savithrikutty not to surrender before Prathapa Varma and persuades her to come along with him; but Savithri does not agree. Prathapa Varma's people beat Govindan Aashaan and others, making them decide to go to some other place. Sankunni sees Savithri Kutty and asks her to come along with him to the new place. Prathapa Varma's people beat Sankunni and kidnaps Savithrikutty. Sankunni reaches Prathapa Varma's house and tries to kill him. At last, he takes Savithrikutty with him.

== Cast ==
- Mohanlal as Sankunni
- Shanthi Krishna as Savithri
- Urvashi as Kasthoori
- Murali as Prathapa Varma Thampuran
- Balan K. Nair as Govindan Aashaan
- Sukumari as Vilasini
- Nedumudi Venu as Krishnanunni
- Oduvil Unnikrishnan as Achuthan
- Santhosh as Sathyan
- Maniyanpilla Raju as Jayakrishnan
- Krishnankutty Nair
- Aranmula Ponnamma
- Kaithapram
- Bobby Kottarakkara as Bheemarajan
- Jagadish as Tharakan
- Kaveri
- Nayana
- Shyama
- Soorya

== Production ==
Vishnulokam was the debut film of Dileep who worked as assistant director. Initially, producer G. Suresh Kumar's wife and actress, Menaka, was decided in the role of Savithri and had 20 days work charted, but opted out due to difficulty in managing her baby daughter, (Revathy), and work at the same time. Later, Shanthi Krishna was cast in the role.

== Trivia ==
This was the first movie in which actor Dileep joined as an assistant director to Kamal. Kamal mentioned in an online program that since the movie had maximum night shoots, it was Dileep who used to keep the film unit entertained after dinner with his mimicry.

== Soundtrack ==
The music was composed by Raveendran and the lyrics were written by Kaithapram Damodaran. A version of the famous Mukesh song "Awaara Hoon", composed by Shankar Jaikishan and written by Hasrat Jaipuri, was also used in the film. This version was crooned by actor Mohanlal. The songs "Mindaathathenthe" and "Kasthoori Ente Kasthoori" are quite popular still today among Kerala audiences.

All lyrics are written by Kaithapram Damodaran, except where noted; all music is composed by Raveendran.

No.	Title	Lyrics	Artist(s)	Length
1.	"Aadyavasanthame"		M. G. Sreekumar
2.	"Aadyavasanthame"		K. S. Chithra
3.	"Awaaraa Hoon"	Hasrat Jaipuri	Mohanlal
4.	"Kasthoori Ente Kasthoori"		M. G. Sreekumar, Sujatha Mohan
5.	"Mindaathathenthe"		M. G. Sreekumar
6.	"Paanappuzha"		Malaysia Vasudevan
