= Lizeta Nikolaou =

Greek singer (1948–2023)

- Λιζέτα Νικολάου
- Born: Ελισάβετ Κατικαρίδου; 2 October 1948; Kalamaria, Thessaloniki, Greece
- Died: 11 August 2023 (aged 74); Piraeus, Greece
- Resting place: Palaio Faliro Cemetery, South Athens
- Occupation: Singer
- Spouse: Giorgos Lianis (m. 1978; div. 1983)
- Children: 1

Elisavet Katikaridou Kalamaria (Greek: Ελισάβετ Κατικαρίδου Καλαμαριά; 2 October 1948 – 11 August 2023), best known as Lizeta Nikolaou (Greek: Λιζέτα Νικολάου), was a Greek singer.

== Life and career ==
Born in Thessaloniki into a family of Pontian origins, Nikolaou began his career as a singer in 1970, performing in the stage musical Dilina. In 1973 she started collaborating on stage and in studio with Vassilis Tsitsanis. She got her breakout thanks to the collaboration with Yannis Markopoulos in three successful albums released between 1974 and 1975. In 1977, she released her first solo album Χαμόγελο της Λιζέτας ("Smile of Lizeta"), which included songs by Tsitsanis, Markopoulos, Giannis Spanos, and Dimos Moutsis.

During her career Nikolaou recorded over 150 songs. Between 1978 and 1983, she was married to journalist and politician Giorgos Lianis. She died from the consequences of a fall from a shop staircase in which she severely hit her head on 11 August 2023, at the age of 74.

== Discography ==
- Το Χαμόγελο Της Λιζέττας, 1977
- Σ' Αγάπησα, Μ' Αγάπησες, 1980
- Βενετιά Και Φανάρι, 1982
- Ποντιακά Τραγούδια Με Τη Λιζέττα Νικολάου, 1985
- Τα Κέφια Της Λιζέττας, 1985
- Έτσι Χάνονται Οι Αγάπες, 1986
- Θέλω Ν' Αντισταθώ, 1989
- Νυχτερινοί Έρωτες, 1990
- Τέρεν Μάνα Πως Χορεύω, 1992
- Τα Τραγούδια Του Πατέρα μου, 1995
- Ποντιακή Ραψωδία, 1997
- Είμαι εδώ, 1999
