= Kazantzidis & Marinella =

Studio album by Stelios Kazantzidis & Marinella
- Released: 18 January 1969
- Recorded: Athens, 1968, studio Polysound
- Genre: World music; Folk; Laïko
- Length: 35:27
- Language: Greek
- Label: PolyGram Greece; Philips
- Producer: PolyGram Records

Stelios Kazantzidis chronology
Stelios Kazantzidis (1968)	Kazantzidis & Marinella (1969)	Nichterides Ki Arachnes (1969)

Marinella chronology
Stalia – Stalia (1969)	Kazantzidis & Marinella (1969)	Otan Simani Esperinos (1969)

Kazantzidis & Marinella (Greek: Καζαντζίδης & Μαρινελλα) is a self-titled studio album by Greek singers Stelios Kazantzidis and Marinella that includes their last common recordings. It was recorded in 1968 and released on 18 January 1969 by PolyGram Records in Greece. Some of these recordings were first released on 45 rpm vinyl records by Philips/Standard in 1968.

This album was issued in mono and stereo. The stereo version of this album was released on CD in 1992 with eight bonus tracks by PolyGram. In September 2006, Universal Music Greece granted a licensed re-release to Athens-based Difono magazine, titled I Teleftees Kines Ichografisis (Their last common recordings), the re-release contained the same tracks as the original album.

== Track listing ==
Side one.

1. "Tha klapsis mia mera" (Θα κλάψεις μια μέρα; Someday you'll cry) – (Nakis Petridis – Stelios Kazantzidis – Pythagoras) – 3:17
2. "Sta vrachia tis Piraikis" (Στα βράχια της Πειραϊκής; On the rocks of Piraiki) – (Nakis Petridis – Kazantzidis – Pythagoras) – 2:58
3. "Apopse s' echo stin agkalia mou" (Απόψε σ' έχω στην αγκαλιά μου; Tonight I've got you in my arms) – (Christos Nikolopoulos – Pythagoras) – 3:14
4. "Mi mou lete gi' afti" (Μη μου λέτε γι' αυτή; Don't tell me about her) – (Nakis Petridis – Stelios Kazantzidis – Pythagoras) – 2:51
5. "Apano pou se xechasa" (Απάνω που σε ξέχασα; Just as I forgot you) – (Nakis Petridis – Kazantzidis – Pythagoras) – 3:16
6. "I pio megali amartia" (Η πιο μεγάλη αμαρτία; The biggest sin) – (Kostas Stamatakis – Pythagoras) – 3:10

Side two.

1. "I kardia tis manas" (Η καρδιά της μάνας; Mother's heart) – (Nakis Petridis – Stelios Kazantzidis – Pythagoras) – 3:00
2. "Ta glika pou psonisa" (Τα γλυκά που ψώνισα; The sweets I bought) – (Nakis Petridis – Kazantzidis – Pythagoras) – 3:21
3. "Ime ki ego amartolos" (Είμαι κι εγώ αμαρτωλός; I am a sinner too) – (Nakis Petridis – Kazantzidis – Pythagoras) – 2:58
4. "Ta roziasmena cheria mou" (Τα ροζιασμένα χέρια μου; Calloused hands) – (Nakis Petridis – Kazantzidis – Pythagoras) – 3:12
5. "Ena remali tou Pirea" (Ένα ρεμάλι του Πειραιά; A bum of Piraeus) – (Nakis Petridis – Kazantzidis – Pythagoras) – 3:12
6. "Avrio se hano" (Αύριο σε χάνω; Tomorrow, I'll lose you) – (Kostas Stamatakis – Pythagoras) – 2:58

Bonus tracks on the CD re-issue.

1. "M' anapses fotia" (Μ' άναψες φωτιά) – (Stelios Kazantzidis – Kostas Delagrammatis) – 3:26
  - This song had been released as a single in 1960.
2. "Ena potiri dakria" (Ένα ποτήρι δάκρυα) – (Nakis Petridis – Stelios Kazantzidis – Pythagoras) – 3:10
  - This song had been recorded in 1968.
3. "Glikia fellaha, klapse" (Γλυκιά φελάχα, κλάψε) – (Stelios Kazantzidis – Vassilis Karapatakis – Christos Kolokotronis) – 3:25
  - This song had been released as a single in 1960.
4. "Den allaxe i kardia mou" (Δεν άλλαξε η καρδιά μου) – (Nakis Petridis – Stelios Kazantzidis – Pythagoras) – 3:22
  - This song had been recorded in 1968.
5. "Glikia mou Athineissa" (Γλυκιά μου Αθηναίισα) – (Stelios Kazantzidis – Christos Kolokotronis) – 3:33
  - This song had been released as a single in 1960.
6. "To tragoudi tis ftochologias" (Το τραγούδι της φτωχολογιάς) – (Stelios Kazantzidis – Kostas Delagrammatis) – 3:10
  - This song had been released as a single in 1960.
7. "Ase me na ziso monachos" (Άσε με να ζήσω μοναχός) – (Christos Nikolopoulos – Pythagoras) – 3:21
  - This song had been recorded in 1968 and released as a single on September 19, 1969.
8. "Glikia mou mana" (Γλυκιά μου μάνα) – (Christos Kolokotronis – Vassilis Karapatakis) – 3:01
  - This song had been released as a single in 1960.

== Personnel ==
- Stelios Kazantzidis – vocals
- Marinella – vocals, background vocals
- Nakis Petridis – arranger, conductor
- PolyGram Records – producer
