= To Agriolouloudo =

"To Agriolouloudo (Greek: Το Αγριολούλουδο)"

Song by Stelios Kazantzidis
- Released: 1970
- Genre: Laïko
- Composer: Christos Nikolopoulos (Greek: Χρήστος Νικολόπουλος)
- Lyricist: Pythagoras (Greek: Πυθαγόρας)

"To Agriolouloudo" (Greek: Το Αγριολούλουδο) is one of the best known songs of Stelios Kazantzidis. The lyrics were written by Pythagoras (Greek: Πυθαγόρας) and music was written by Christos Nikolopoulos (Greek: Χρήστος Νικολόπουλος) in 1970. The title "To Agriolouloudo" means "The Wild Flower".

== Lyrics ==
Don't feel sorry for me, drive me away tonight
as if I am a wild flower
and cut my life
I began nude
I am heading on all alone
My house is the street
and my song is the pain
Drive me away and don't feel pity for me
don't be afraid of what will become of me
even if it snows or if it rains
the wild flower does remain
Don't keep me just out of sympathy
I'm used to the cold I 'll manage the snow (too)
I began nude
I am heading on all alone
My house is the street
and my song is the pain
Drive me away and don't feel pity for me
don't be afraid of what will become of me
even if it snows or if it rains

— Singer: Stelios Kazantzidis, Songwriter: Pythagoras, Composer: Christos Nikolopoulos
