= Akadimia Platonos =

Neighborhood in Athens, Greece

Akadimia Platonos Ακαδημία Πλάτωνος
- Neighborhood
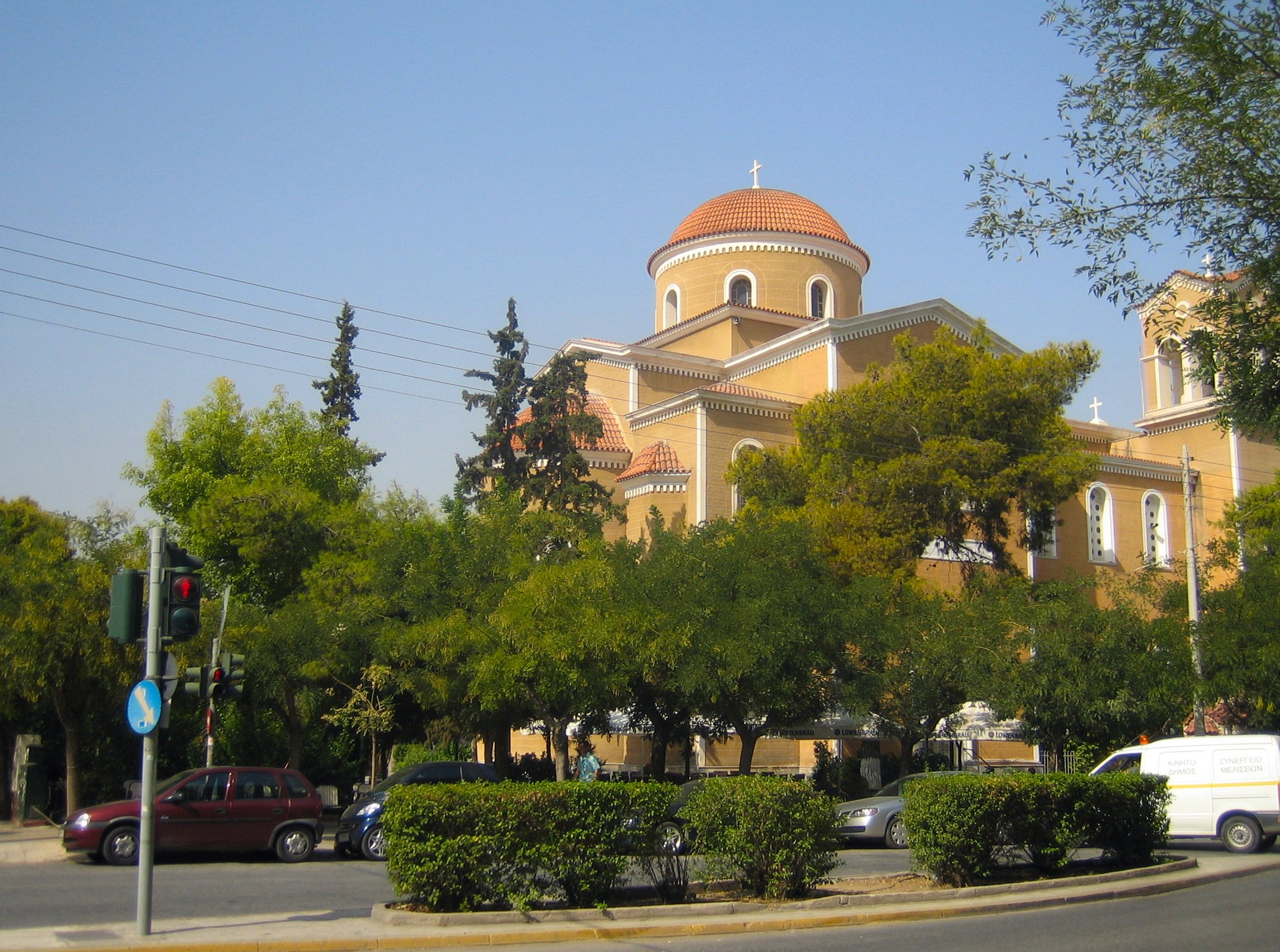
- A church in Akadimia Platonos

- Location within municipality of Athens
- Coordinates: 37°59′36″N 23°42′42″E
- Country: Greece
- Region: Attica
- City: Athens
- Postal code: 104 41
- Area code: 210
- Website: www.cityofathens.gr

Akadimia Platonos (Greek: Ακαδημία Πλάτωνος pronounced [akaðiˈmia ˈpla.to.nos]) literally meaning Plato's Academy, is a neighbourhood located 3 km (2 mi) west-northwest of the downtown part of the Greek capital of Athens.

== History ==
The area is named after Plato's Academy, which he founded in the area in 387 BC and which continued to operate until it was destroyed by the Roman dictator Sulla in 86 BC. Excavations of Ancient artefacts began in 1929 and continue to the present day, under the auspices of the third General Directorate of Antiquities.

The area saw housing developments in the early part of the 20th century when Athens began to grow. An industrial zone was also laid out during this time. The area was mostly urbanised during the period after World War II and the civil war.

== Present day ==
The area is densely populated, with people mainly living in five to seven-story buildings. Major streets bordering this subdivision include the A1 motorway to the north, Lenorman Avenue to the east, Palamidou Street to the south, and Athinon Avenue (part of the EO8 road) to the west.

The two main squares are Akademia Platonos and Metaxa. The population is approximately 15,000.

== Residential streets ==
Several residential streets are named after places in the Peloponnese, famous people, and myths.

Aimonos Street
Alamanas Street
Alexandrias Street
Amplianis Street
Angelopoulou Street
Argous Street
Astrous Street
Dimosthenous Street
Epidavrou Street
Efrosynis Street
Efkleidis Street

Flioudos Street
Gordiou Street
Levidiou Street
Marathonomachon Street
Milou Street
Monastiraki Street
Nafpliou Street
Nevrokopiou Street
Platonos Street
Pylou Street

Serron Street
Tilefanous Street
Themiskyras Street
Tileou Street
Tripoleos Street
Vassilikon Street
Vourbiani Street

== Amenities ==
Akadimia Platonos has schools, lyceums (middle schools), gymnasia (secondary schools), churches, banks, shops and squares (plateies). The nearest Athens Metro subway station is to the east (Metaxourgeio metro station).

Akadimia Platonos has also given its name to the title of a movie screened in Locarno Film Festival 2009 directed by Filippos Tsitos.
