= Awaara Hoon =

Song by Mukesh

from the album Awaara
- Language: Hindi-Urdu
- Released: 1951
- Genre: Film song
- Songwriter: Shailendra
- Composer: Shankar Jaikishan

Awara Hoon

"Awaara Hoon" (transl. I am a Vagabond) is a song from the 1951 Indian film Awaara, directed by and starring Raj Kapoor, which was internationally popular. The song was written in the Hindi-Urdu language by lyricist Shailendra, and sung by Mukesh. "Awaara Hoon" immediately struck "a chord in audiences from various classes and backgrounds all over India and beyond: in China, in the Soviet Union, in the Middle East." In China, "both the song and film were said to be Chairman Mao's favourites." In a May 2013 BBC poll, the song was rated the second-greatest Bollywood song of all time.

== Local versions ==
The popularity of "Awaara Hoon" led to the creation of localized versions of the song in Greece, Turkey, the Middle East, the Soviet Union, China, and Romania.

== Example verse ==
The refrain of the song is "Awaara Hoon", which means "I am a vagabond/tramp", here the world vagabond symbolises the free and resilient spirit of singer and he have no sorrow or tentions on his face, his verses symbolizes hope and optimism in the world of hardships . It has a catchy, rhythmic tempo with several short lines interposed with a few slightly longer ones. It is still considered to be a timeless song of much of South Asia, China, the Balkans, Russia, and Central Asia.
