= Giorgos Lianis =

Greek journalist and politician

Giorgos Lianis Γιώργος Λιάνης
- Born: September 2, 1942 (age 84); Amyntaio , Greece
- Occupations: journalist writer politician

Giorgos Lianis (Greek: Γιώργος Λιάνης; born in Amyntaio, 2 September 1942) is a Greek journalist, writer and politician

== Biography ==
He was born on 2 September 1942 in Amyntaio, Florina. He is a first cousin of Dimitra Liani and nephew of the professor and minister Georgios Lianis and lieutenant general Konstantinos Lianis. He studied in the Department of Chemistry of the Aristotle University of Thessaloniki. In his younger years he was a football player for G.S. Iraklis in the Super League.

He was a main witness in the trial of the perpetrators of the junta submitting important documents and recorded talks he had acquired, with evidence against Georgios Papadopoulos, Ioannis Ladas and Dimitrios Ioannidis.

He was elected member of parliament of Florina with PASOK in June 1989 and reelected in November 1989, 1990, 1993, 1996, 2000, 2004, 2007 and 2009. He served as Deputy Minister of Sport in the Ministry of Culture during 1993 – 1996 and 2002 – 2004.

On 14 June 2011 he left the parliamentary group of PASOK, refusing to vote the medium-term consolidation program for the Greek economy.

== Sources ==
- Giorgos Lianis' biography in Eleutherotypia
