= Dio Portes Echi i Zoi =

Song by Stelios Kazantzidis and Marinella
- Language: Greek
- Released: 1959
- Recorded: Athens, 1959
- Genre: World music; folk; laïko
- Label: His Master's Voice, AO-5544
- Songwriters: Stelios Kazantzidis; Eftychia Papagianopoulou

"Dio portes echi i zoi" (Greek: Δύο πόρτες έχει η ζωή; English: Life has two doors), sometimes billed as "Tora pou fevgo ap' ti zoi" or "To telefteo vrady mou", is a Greek-language song (laïko) performed by popular Greek singers Stelios Kazantzidis and Marinella. The lyrics are by Eftychia Papagianopoulou and the music is by Kazantzidis himself. The song was first released on 78 rpm vinyl record in 1959 by His Master's Voice in Greece. The record also contained the song "Madhubala" and sold about 100,000 pieces in its year of release, beating the previous record of 45,000 record sales that Hadjidakis song "Garifallo st' afti" had set. It is one of the most famous Laïko songs of all time.

== Personnel ==
- Stelios Kazantzidis - vocals, arranger, conductor
- Marinella - background vocals
- His Master's Voice - producer
