= Giorgos Zampetas =

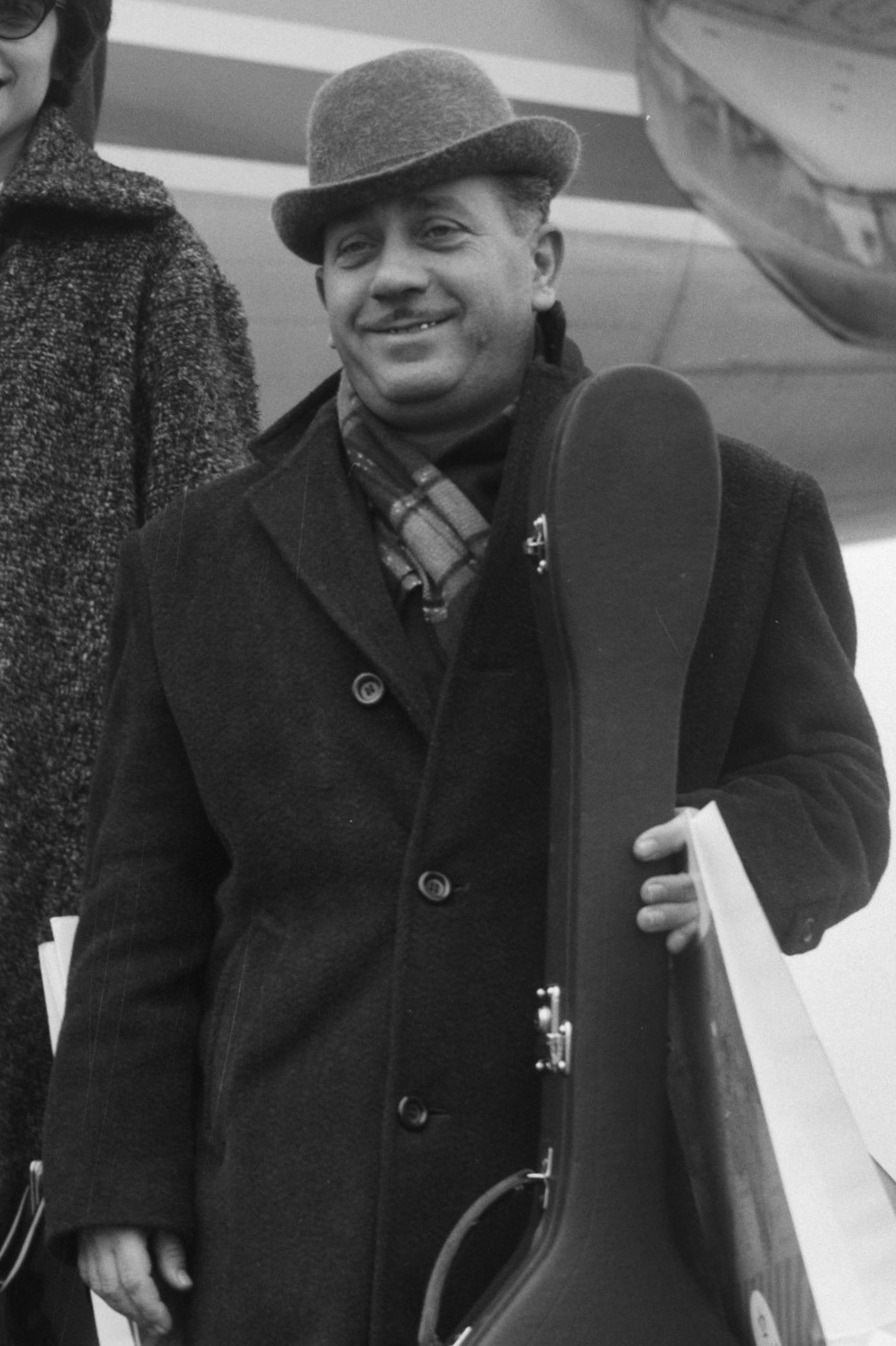

Background information
- Born: 25 January 1925; Akadimia Platonos, Athens, Greece
- Origin: Kythnos, Greece
- Died: 10 March 1992 (aged 67) Athens, Greece
- Genres: Rebetiko, laiko
- Occupations: Musician, songwriter, artist, composer
- Instrument: Bouzouki
- Years active: 1950–1992

Giorgos Zampetas (also Zambetas; Greek: Γιώργος Ζαμπέτας; 25 January 1925 – 10 March 1992) was a Greek bouzouki musician and composer. He was born in Athens, where he also died, but his origins were from the island of Kythnos.

== Early years ==
Giorgos Zampetas, Greek music composer, singer, and one of the greatest bouzouki artists was born on 25 January 1925, in Akadimia Platonos. His parents were Mihalis Zampetas, a barber, and Marika Moraiti, the niece of a well-known baritone of those years.

From a very young age, Zampetas showed a great interest in music: as he was helping his father in his barber shop, he secretly played his first melodies on a bouzouki. Anything that was producing sound seemed exciting to him and helped him in his compositions, as he said in his biography, not long before he died. In 1932, as a seven-year-old first grader, he won his first prize, playing his first song in a school competition. At the young age of 13, Giorgos met one of the most famous figures in Greek music, and one of his idols, Vassilis Tsitsanis which played a fundamental role in his musical career.

During the German occupation of Greece, Zampetas founded his first band in 1942, after having moved to the Egaleo neighborhood of Athens, 2 years prior to that.

== Career ==
Zampetas was one of the most recognized Greek musicians of all time, working in the Greek cinema of those years with stars such as Aliki Vouyouklaki. He appeared in many Greek film productions, and his compositions were used in many, one of the most famous being "Siko Horepse Sirtaki". He also worked with famous Greek composers, such as Manos Hadjidakis in 1959, and thereafter collaborated with various leading Greek musicians such as Theodorakis, Stavros Xarchakos, and many others.

== Later years ==
The 1990s brought about new records and releases by Zampetas. However, in early 1992, his health deteriorated and he was diagnosed with bone cancer, which had already reached advanced stages.

Zampetas died at the age of 67, in the Sotiria Hospital of Athens. Prior to that, he had made one final stage appearance.

He was survived by family in Greece, as well as extended family members throughout the Greek diaspora.

== Legacy ==
Zampetas is recognized as one of the most famous and most significant composers and musicians who have contributed to the Greek Laïko music genre.

His former neighborhood of Egaleo (where he had spent his late teen years and early twenties) honored Zampetas by naming the town square in his name, to commemorate him in September 1990.

== Songs ==
Below is a brief list of some of Zampetas' most recognisable songs; in brackets are the year of creation and the name of the lyricist:

- Το κουτούκι (1960, Eftihia Papagianopoulou)
- Δεν έχει δρόμο να διαβώ (1963, Dimitris Christodoulou)
- Κι αν θα διαβείς τον ουρανό (1964, Dimitris Christodoulou)
- Πόρτα κλειστή τα χείλη σου (1964, Dimitris Christodoulou)
- Τα δειλινά (1964, Charalampos Vasiliadis)
- Ξημερώματα (1965, Dimitris Christodoulou)
- Με το βοριά (1965, Dimitris Christodoulou)
- Μεσάνυχτα που θα σε βρω (1965, Dimitris Christodoulou)
- Σήκω χόρεψε συρτάκι (1965, Alekos Sakelarios)
- Χαμόγελο (1965, Alekos Sakelarios)
- Το Φανταράκι (1965, Γ. Φέρρης, στη ταινία "Μερικές το προτιμούν χακί")
- Η Κυριακή (1965, Alekos Sakelarios)
- Θεσσαλονίκη (1965, Elias Eliopoulos)
- Πάρε τον δρόμο τον παλιό (1966, Dimitris Christodoulou)
- Δημήτρη μου Δημήτρη μου (1966, Alekos Sakelarios)
- Σταλιά, σταλιά (1967, Dionisis Jeffronis)
- Ποιος είναι αυτός (1968, Pythagoras)
- Έρχομαι έρχομαι (1968, Pythagoras)
- Τι να φταίει (1969, Dimitris Christodoulou)
- Αγωνία (1970, Charalambos Vasiliadis)
