= Stelios Kazantzidis =

Greek singer (1931–2001)

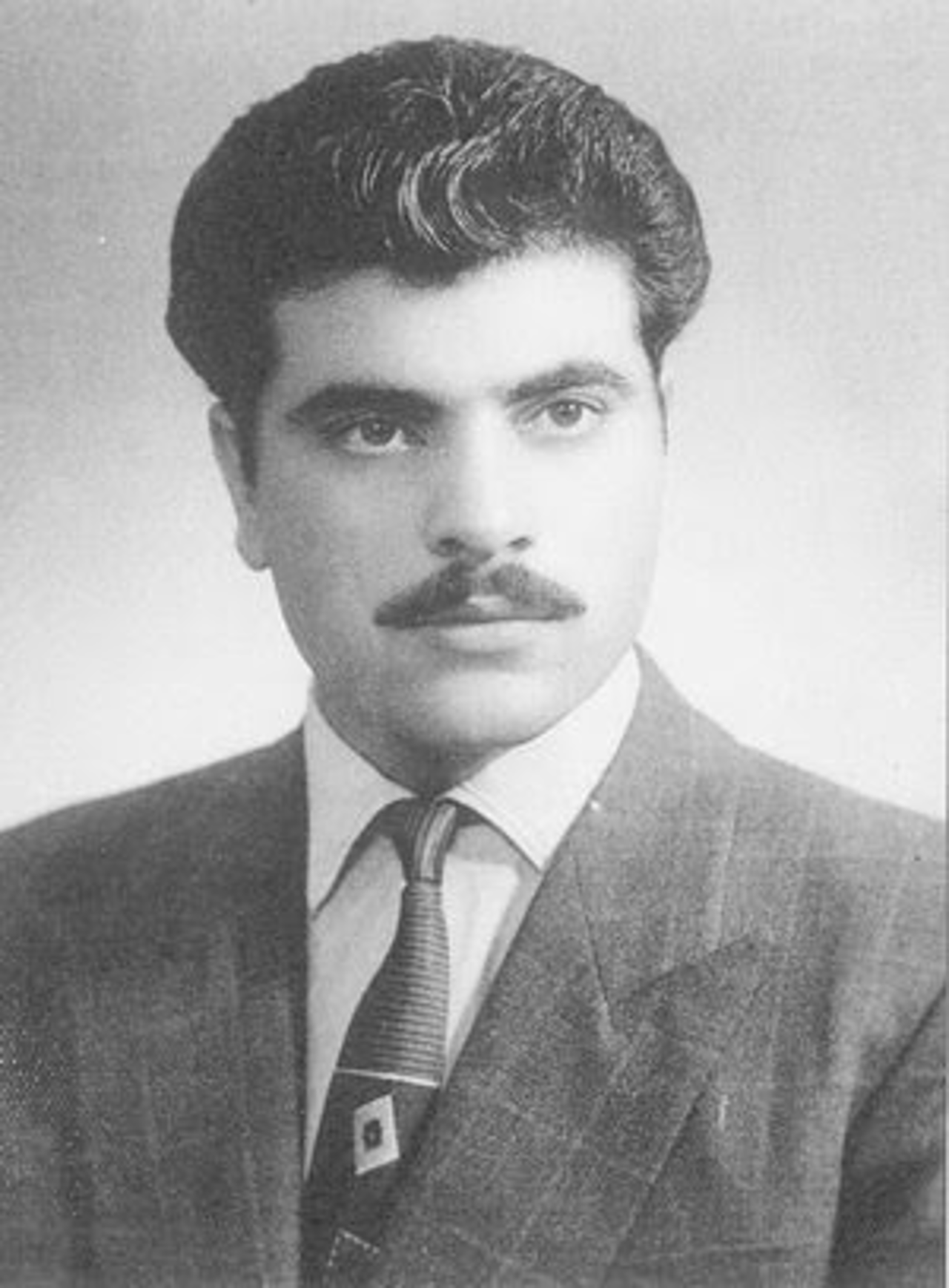

Background information
- Born: Stylianos Kazantzidis; 29 August 1931; Nea Ionia, Greece
- Died: 14 September 2001 (aged 70) Marousi, Greece
- Genres: Laïko, rebetiko
- Occupation: Singer
- Instruments: vocals, occasional 12-string guitar
- Years active: 1952–2000
- Labels: HMV, Standard, Olympic, Nina, Odeon, Minos, Parlophone, Columbia, Music Box/MBI, Capitol, Regal, Phillips, Peters International, Polydor
- Formerly of: Marinella, Kaiti Grey, Litsa Diamandi, Christos Nikolopoulos.

Stelios Kazantzidis (Greek: Στέλιος Καζαντζίδης; 29 August 1931 – 14 September 2001) was one of the most prominent Greek singers. His roots were from Pontus and Asia Minor. A top artist of Greek music, or Laïkó, he collaborated with many of Greece's foremost composers.

== Biography ==
Kazantzidis was born on 29 August 1931, in Nea Ionia. He was the first of two brothers born to Haralambos Kazantzidis, a Pontic Greek from Ordu (Greek: Κοτύωρα/Kotyora) and Gesthimani Kazantzidi, who was a Greek refugee from the town of Alanya (known as Alaiya) (Greek: Κορακήσιον/Korakesion) in what is now southern Turkey and migrated to Greece as a result of the Greco-Turkish War (1919–1922). He was orphaned at the age of 16 when his father, a member of the Greek Resistance, was beaten to death by guerillas in 1947, during the Greek Civil War. This forced Kazantzidis into employment, working as a baggage-carrier at Omonia Square and then for an interstate bus company, as a seller of roasted chestnuts at open markets, and as a labourer at the Nea Ionia textile mills.

His life changed when the owner of a factory, which was located in the Perissos working district, gave him a guitar. He spent long hours playing music. He made his first public appearance at a Kifissia night club in the early 1950s and soon after, in July 1952, made his first studio recording at Columbia studios with a song entitled "I'm going for a swim" (Για μπάνιο πάω), written by Apostolos Kaldaras. It did not do well but he tried again, recording Giannis Papaioannou's "The suitcases" (Οι βαλίτσες) soon after. The song became the first of many hits and with his newfound popularity he began to make appearances in some of the biggest clubs of the time, like "Theios", "Mpertzeletos" and "Rosignol". With his career in full swing, Kazantzidis began to collaborate with some of the biggest names in Greek music, among them Manolis Chiotis, Manos Hadjidakis, Mikis Theodorakis, and Stavros Xarhakos.

A hallmark in his career – and an event of great importance for the musical scene of post-war Greece – was his cooperation with composer Vassilis Tsitsanis. Starting in 1956 it resulted in several new songs as well as reinterpretions of Tsitsanis older songs. Kazantzidis, thus, sung and popularized such rebetiko classics as "Synnefiasmeni Kyriaki", "Bakse tsifliki" and "Ta Kavourakia". These songs, and many others, previously unknown to the wide public suddenly became cherished and sought after.

A few years later Kazantzidis started to develop his own musical style, a style with influences ranging from rebetika to Indian music. This new turn met with considerable success and became a template for later developments in Greek popular music. "Mantoubala" for example, a Kazantzidis original, was inspired by Madhubala, an Indian actress he saw. This was the first record in Greece to sell over 100,000 copies, an amazing fact since the total population of the country (at the time) was about 7.5 million.

Stelios Kazantzidis married Marinella on 7 May 1964 and they toured together in Germany and the United States. The two of them became a legendary duo. In 1965, Kazantzidis, whilst at the peak of his career, decided to stop appearing in nightclubs. For the next ten years, he only released studio albums. In September 1966 he divorced Marinella, and they recorded their last duets ("Mi Mou Lete Gia Aftin", "Apopse Se Eho Stin Agalia Mou" and "I Kardia Tis Manas") for Philips the following year.

Following Marinella's departure Litsa Diamandi became his primary female harmony vocalist in 1968. The album simply titled Stelios Kazantzidis (often referred to as the "balloon album", due to its cover artwork), was a transitional album. Marinella sang on some songs (including "Pame Tsarka"-an updated version of Tsitsanis' "Bakse Tsifliki") and Diamandi on others (e.g. the big hit "Efiye Efiye").

In 1968, Kazantzidis recorded "Nyhterides Ki Arahnes", written by newcomer Christos Nikolopoulos; the song became an immediate success. The follow-up to this album, Ena Gramma had a number of hits, which included "Sto Trapezi Pou Tha Pino", "Pare T' Ahnaria", "Tha Kopso to Telefono" and "Kai Oi Andres Klene". Marinella had an "answer back" to that latter song, by releasing "Oi Andres Den Klene" (men don't cry).

In 1973 he collaborated with songwriter Akis Panou and released an album with six songs, including one of his biggest hits, "I zoi mou oli", and in 1974 he recorded "Stin Anatoli", composed by Mikis Theodorakis. The next year he recorded another one of his biggest hits, "Iparho", penned by Pythagoras. Suddenly Kazantzidis rocked the Greek music industry again, when he announced his decision to stop recording. He accused his label of "colonial-like" contracts and took a leave from recording. In 1987 he recorded again for the first time after 12 years. "Ο Dromos Tis Epistrofis" (Ο Δρόμος της Επιστροφής) sold 200,000 copies in a few hours and became a commercial success. He continued to release special records occasionally for the rest of his life (Eleftheros, Vradiazei, Tragoudo etc). Kazantidis, besides his work on folk music, also recorded four records with Pontic music alongside Chrysanthos Theodoridis, the greatest Pontic singer, songwriter, and lyricist. On 19 December 2024, his life was brought to the big screen in the movie I Exist, starring Christos Mastoras. In just the first four days of its release, the film sold 118,000 tickets. The film was released in 2025 in Australia, also to great success amongst the diaspora - however it was released under the name "Stelios".

== Foreign audiences ==
In Israel, he was a musical icon. Many of his songs were translated into Hebrew and performed by the country's leading singers. Yaron Enosh, an Israel Radio broadcaster who often plays Greek music on his programs, described the singer's ability to combine joy with sorrow: "This is the task of music: to touch the entire range of feelings...Kazantzidis could do this; he played on all the strings." To the Greek Jews who immigrated to Israel, Kazantzidis was "the voice of the world they left behind, for good or for bad." According to the operator of Radio Agapi, a station that plays Greek music 24 hours a day, "Kazantzidis was the voice of the people, of the weary, the exploited, the betrayed. And the voice of the refugee and the emigre, too."

In the 1970s/80s, many Greek recording artists, including Kazantzidis, had recordings issued by the New York-based P.I. (Peters International) label, for the Greek diaspora in the USA.

Minos also had Kazantzidis recordings issued in Israel, for the local market there.

== Death ==
Kazantzidis died of a brain tumor, at Athens Medical Center, on 14 September 2001, at age 70. His death was an emotional event for Greece, as attested to by the many obituaries in appreciation of his life and work. His funeral through the streets of Elefsina (26 km from Athens) was broadcast live on Greek television. His music was also beloved by the Greek diaspora all over the world, capturing their feelings in the difficult post-war period.

He was commemorated on a Greek postage stamp in 2010.

== Film ==
Greek popular music had long been intertwined with Greek post-war cinema. In the 50s and 60s, almost every film contained portions of music performed on screen, often by Kazantzidis.

- I Kyria dimarhos (1960) – Mrs Mayor
- Paixe, Bouzouki Mou Hlyko (1965) – Play, my sweet Bouzouki
- I Timoria (1965) – The punishment
- Afiste Me Na Ziso (1965) – Let me live
- Adistaktoi (1965) – The Ruthless
- Oi Angeloi Tis Amartias (To Limani) (1966) – Angels of sin
- Eho Dikaioma Na S'Agapo! (1966) – I have the right to love you
- O Gerontokoros (1967) – The aged bachelor
- I Ora Tis Dikaiosynis (1967) – The hour of justice
- Adiki Katara (1967) – Unjust Curse
- Ta Psihoula Tou Kosmou (1968) – The breadcrumbs of the world
- Oi Andres Den Lygizoun Pote! (1968) – Men never bend
- O Gigas Tis Kypselis (1968) – Kypseli's Giant
- Foukarades Kai Leftades (1970) – The unfortunate and the rich
- Kravges Ston Anemo (1976) – Shouts in the wind
- Eis Mnimin Harry Klynn (1981)

Two of his songs ("To Psomi Tis Ksenitias" and "Ena Sidero Anameno") are featured in Season 2 of the hit HBO TV series The Wire, during the season's second-to-last episode, "Bad Dreams". The first is heard in the background of a restaurant while the second is heard in multiple of the final scenes of the episode; the music was not sourced anywhere on set, a technique rarely used by the show's producers.

"Epsahna Adika Na Vro" is audible in the Movie "Summer Lovers". However, it does not appear on the soundtrack album, nor is it in the film credits.

== Discography ==
=== Albums ===
- 1961 – 1963
- "Kazantzidis & Marinella – Megales Epitihies" (Great hits) 1964
- "Chrysos Diskos Kazantzidi & Marinellas" / "Songs from the North American Tour" 1965 (Actually studio recordings of the songs they performed in the US/Canada. Taping of the Carnegie Hall show was planned but never occurred. Other tour stops were in Montreal, Toronto, Chicago, and Boston. No bootleg recordings of any of these concerts, are known to exist).
- "Kazantzidis #3" (mid-1960s recordings on Odeon, not to be confused with another album, also called "#3" which is on Regal, and is a hits compilation)
- "Katahnia" 1965
- "Tragoudise Mazi Mas" (Sing together) 1966
- "Stelios Kazantzidis" (self-titled, "Balloon Cover" album) 1968
- "Kazantzidis & Marinella" 1969
- "Nichterides Ki' Arachnes" (Bats and spiders) 1969
- "Ena Gramma" (One Letter) 1970
- "O Gialinos Kosmos" (A World of Glass) 1971
- "I Stenahoria Mou"(My distress)1971
- "O Gyrismos" (The Return) 1972
- H Zoi mou Oli 1973
- Stin Anatoli 1974
- "Iparcho" (I exist) 1975
- O Dromos tis Epistrofis (1987)
- "Elevtheros" (The Victor) 1988
- Oti Den Eipa (MBI 1989)
- "Stelios Kazantzidis & Marinella – Ta Tragoudia Tis Amerikis" (The songs of America) 1991
- Vradiazei (MBI 1992)
- Kai Pou Theos 1994
- Synapanteman 1994
- Ta viomata mou 1995
- Afieroma 1996
- Tragoudo 1997
- Stin ellas tou 2000
- "O Stelios Tragoudaei" (Stelios is singing) 2001–02
- "Stelios Kazantzidis: Ta zeibekika" 2003

=== Appearances on Compilation albums ===
- Retsina and Bouzouki No. 2 and #3(HMV, Greece)
- Greek Serenade(Capitol, USA)....includes "Vraho Vraho ton Kaimo Mou" and "O Kyr-Antonis"
- Nina "Custom Series"(Nina, USA)....late 1950s Greek hits compilation of various artists, spread through six discs—the first four have no Kazantzidis songs, but he appears on the last two, with "Tha Vro Moumouri Baglama" and "Enoho Chryma"...
- The wire "...and all the pieces matter" with his theme "Efuge, efuge"

=== Singles ===
Notable Stelios Kazantzidis songs include:

- I zoi mou oli – My entire life – 2:57
- Dio Portes Echi i Zoi – Life has two doors – 3:20
- To Agriolouloudo – The wildflower – 2:50
- Allotines Mou Epoches – My former times – 2:43
- Anemona – 3:00
- De Tha Ksanagapiso – I will never love again – 3:10
- As Eicha tin Ygeia Mou – If I had my health – 3:03
- An Einai i Agapi Egklima – If love is a crime – 2:26
- Ego me tin Axia Mou – Me with my worth – 3:15
- Eimai Ena Kormi Chameno – I'm a lost man – 3:33
- Exo Ap'Adiko – I have suffered injustice – 3:04
- Gyrizo Ap'ti Nychta – I return from the night – 2:58
- Tin Kalyva Ti Diki Mou – That hut of mine – 2:32
- I Kardia Mou As Opsetai – Take a look at my heart – 3:16
- Kathenas me ton Pono Tou – Each with his pain – 3:20
- Katastrofes kai Symfores – Catastrophes and misfortunes – 3:45
- Ki An Gello Einai Psema – And if I laugh, it's a lie – 3:24
- Me Xypnas Charamata – You wake me at dawn – 2:40
- Niotho mia Kourasi Vareia – I feel a deep weariness – 3:05
- Nomiza Pos Itan Filoi – I thought that they were friends – 3:15
- Otan Methaei o Anthropos – When A man gets drunk – 2:46
- Pare ta Chnaria Mou – Take my footprints – 3:08
- I Stenochoria Mou – My concerns – 3:00
- Tha to Po Fanera – I'll say it openly – 3:24
- Sto Trapezi pou ta Pino – At the table where I drink – 2:37
- H Kypros einai Elliniki – Cyprus is Greek – 3:12
- Nea Ionia – Nea Ionia – 2:49
- Tha Kopso to Telefono - I'll Break the Telephone
- Klaio Kai Pono – Crying and in Pain
- Vradiazei
- Tragodo
- Gyalinos Kosmos
- Epsahna adika na vro
- To tholomeno mou myalo
- Afti i nyxchta menei
- Ti gyreveis palikari

=== Cover Versions and Related ===
- Poly Panou "Tis Fthologias Tragoudi"("The Poor Peoples' Song")single written by Kazantzidis. He is on the B-side of the single, "Ap' To Pono Tha Pethano"
- Christos Nikolopoulos....Bouzouki player for Kazantzidis in the 1970s/80s has solo recordings out.
- Daviko......Israeli singer has an album called "Yassoo Kazantzidi". Songs are a mix of Greek and Hebrew.
- "Efiye Efiye" has been sampled, and used in the songs by J Love("Track 19") and Action Bronson("Eastern Promises").
- Zohar Argov, Israeli singer, had a local hit called "Elinor"---which is "Yparho" but with new lyrics written in Hebrew.
- Dimitris Mitropanos, another famous Greek singer, had covered a Kazantzidis song, "Gyrizo Ap' Tin Nychta" TWICE.....both the studio and live versions became hits in Greece.
