= Lefteris Papadopoulos =

Greek lyricist, writer, and journalist

- Born: 14 November 1935 (age 90); Athens, Greece
- Occupations: Lyricist; Writer; Journalist
- Children: 2

Lefteris Papadopoulos (Greek: Λευτέρης Παπαδόπουλος; born 14 November 1935) is a Greek lyricist, writer and journalist.

== Biography ==
Papadopoulos was born in Athens, Greece on 14 November 1935. He is the son of Greek Anatolian refugees, with a father from a village near Bursa in Turkey and a mother from a village near Novorossiysk in Russia. His parents were expelled in 1924 during the population exchange between Greece and Turkey. He enrolled at the Law School of the University of Athens but stopped during his third year in order to work as a journalist. Since 1959 Papadopoulos has worked in the newspaper Ta Nea and has become a popular columnist over time.

Papadopoulos became involved with music in 1963. He has written the lyrics for about 1,200 songs and has co-worked with nearly all of the well-known musicians, composers and singers of his generation, namely Mikis Theodorakis, Stavros Xarhakos, Manos Loizos, Stavros Koujioumtzis, Mimis Plessas, Christos Nikolopoulos, Stelios Kazantzidis, Grigoris Bithikotsis, George Dalaras, Marinella, Viki Mosholiou and others. In 1969, composer Mimis Plessas's work of songs "O Dromos", to which Papadopoulos contributed the lyrics, became the fastest selling Greek album. Of all the creative partnerships that Papadopoulos has had with Greek composers, that of his close friend Manos Loizos is considered a landmark of his career.

Papadopoulos contributed lyrics to some Greek songs from 1960 to 1990. He also wrote a few literary books, and one about the lyricist Eftychia Papagianopoulou. He has presented various programmes about Greek Music on television; the most recent, entitled "Makrines Filies" (Remote Friendships), was broadcast on National Television, ERT.

Papadopoulos is married to a theatrical director and has a son and a daughter as well as two grandchildren.
