= Mimis Plessas =

Greek composer and conductor (1924–2024)

- Μίμης Πλέσσας
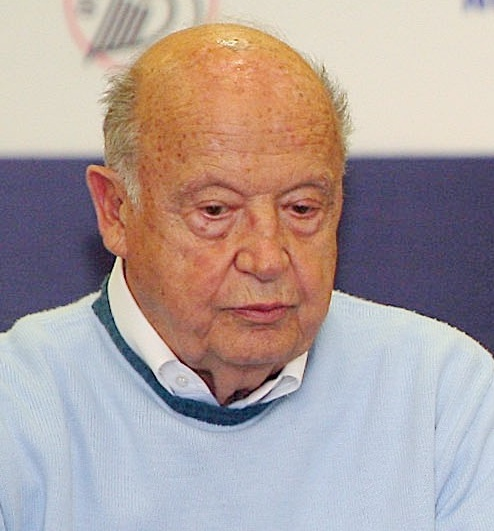
- Plessas in 2010
- Born: Dimitrios Plessas; 12 October 1924; Athens, Greece
- Died: 5 October 2024 (aged 99); Athens, Greece
- Education: Lycée Léonin; National and Kapodistrian University of Athens (BSc); Cornell University (PhD)
- Occupations: Musician; composer; conductor; pianist
- Years active: 1952–2024
- Spouse: Clio Muzinë (divorced) Tzella Plessa (divorced) Loukila Carrer (m. 1992)
- Children: Antonis; Eleana
- Parents: Antonis Plessas (father); Eleni Plessas (mother)
- Relatives: Stefanos Korkolis (nephew)
- Awards: Order of the Phoenix; Order of Honour

Dimitrios "Mimis" Plessas (Greek: Δημήτριος «Μίμης» Πλέσσας; 12 October 1924 – 4 October 2024) was a Greek musician, composer, conductor and pianist.

== Life and career ==
Plessas was born in Athens. He attended the Lycée Léonin school in the Athens suburb of Nea Smyrni, and subsequently obtained a degree in chemistry at the University of Athens. He was then awarded a scholarship to attend Cornell University in New York, where he obtained a PhD in chemistry on the protein myelin.

He began his musical career in 1952 and wrote music for over 100 films, television and radio programs, and theatrical events. He worked with such notable Greek singers as Nana Mouskouri, Vicky Leandros, Giannis Poulopoulos, Marinella, Rena Koumioti and lyricist Lefteris Papadopoulos.

Plessas combined the traditions of entekhno and laïkó with considerable success, notably making it his own style. His composition work O Dromos in 1969 (The Street) still remains the work with the most sales in the history of the Greek discography.

In 2001 he was honored with the Gold Cross of the Order of the Phoenix.

Mimis Plessas died on 5 October 2024, one week before his 100th birthday.

== Sources ==
- Article about Mimis Plessas on Musicheaven.gr
