= 15 Chronia Marinella =

Compilation album by Marinella
- Released: 1982 (Greece)
- Recorded: 1967–1981
- Studio: studio Polysound, Athens
- Genre: World music, Folk, Modern Laika, Éntekhno
- Language: Greek
- Label: PolyGram Greece, Philips
- Producer: Philippos Papatheodorou

Marinella chronology
Marinella – Gia 'Senane Boro (1981)	15 Chronia Marinella (1982)	Gia 'Sena Ton Agnosto (1983)

Marinella compilation album chronology
Portraito (1980)	15 Chronia Marinella (1982)	14 Apo Ta Oraiotera Tragoudia Mou (1987)

15 Chronia Marinella (Greek: 15 Χρόνια Μαρινέλλα, 15 Years Marinella) is the name of a double compilation album by Greek singer Marinella. The reason for its release was to celebrate the 25 years of Marinella's solo career (1967–1982), with recordings from 1967 to 1981. It was released in 1982 by PolyGram Records in Greece and it went gold selling over 50,000 units.

== Track listing ==
=== Disc 01 ===
Side One.

1. "Stalia – stalia" (Σταλιά – σταλιά; Drop by drop) – (Giorgos Zampetas – Dionisis Tzefronis)
  - This song had been released on Stalia – Stalia and as a single on 11 March 1968.
2. "Anixe petra (na kleisto)" (Άνοιξε πέτρα; Open stone) – (Mimis Plessas – Lefteris Papadopoulos)
  - This song had been released on Stalia – Stalia and as a single on 28 November 1968.
3. "Ti na ftei" (Τι να φταίει; What is wrong?) – (Giorgos Zampetas – Dimitris Christodoulou)
  - This song had been released on Otan Simani Esperinos and as a single on 10 June 1969.
4. "Pali tha klapso" (Πάλι θα κλάψω; Again, I will cry) – (Nakis Petridis – Sevi Tiliakou)
  - This song had been released on Ena Tragoudi In' I Zoi Mou and as a single on 5 December 1969.
5. "Krima to boi sou" (Κρίμα το μπόι σου; Shame on your height) – (Giorgos Hadjinasios – Sevi Tiliakou)
  - This song had been released on Marinella – Enas Mythos and as a single on 14 May 1970.
6. "I antres den klene" (Οι άντρες δεν κλαίνε; Men don't cry) – (Giorgos Katsaros – Pythagoras)
  - This song had been released on Stalia – Stalia and as a single on 16 February 1968.
7. "Piretos (Kathe gnorimia)" (Πυρετός; Fever) – (Akis Panou)
  - This song had been released as a single on 13 April 1971.

Side Two.

1. "Giati Fovase (From souvenirs to souvenirs)" (Γιατί φοβάσαι; Why do you dread?) – (Stélios Vlavianós – Robert Constandinos – Pythagoras)
  - This song had been released on Marinella Gia Panta.
2. "Adio" (Αντίο; Good-bye) feat. The Athenians & Tzavara Twins – (Kostas Hatzis – Sotia Tsotou)
  - This song had been released on Marinella & Athenians.
3. "Drigi, drigi mana mou (Velvet mornings)" (Ντρίγκι, ντρίγκι, μάνα μου; Drigi, drigi, my mother) – (Stélios Vlavianós – Robert Constandinos – Pythagoras)
  - This song had been released as a single on 17 January 1973. A live version appears on Mia Vradia Me Tin Marinella No. 2.
4. "San kapios thiasos" (Σαν κάποιος θίασος; Like a troupe of actors) – (Giorgos Krimizakis – Sotia Tsotou)
  - This song had been released on Marinella Gia Panta.
5. "Pou pane ekina ta pedia (My reason)" (Πού πάνε εκείνα τα παιδιά; Where are those young men going?) – (Stélios Vlavianós – Charis Chalkitis – Pythagoras)
  - This song had been released as a single on 17 January 1973.
6. "Mana mou kripse to spathi" (Μάνα μου κρύψε το σπαθί; Mother, hide the sword) – (Giorgos Katsaros – Pythagoras)
  - This song had been released on Albania.
7. "Gramma ap' to Metopo" (Γράμμα απ' το Μέτωπο; Letter from the Front) – (Giorgos Katsaros – Pythagoras)
  - This song had been released on Albania.

=== Disc 02 ===
Side One.

1. "Olos o kosmos is' esy" (Όλος ο κόσμος είσ' εσύ; You're the whole world) – (Kostas Hatzis – Sotia Tsotou)
2. "S' agapo" (Σ' αγαπώ; I love you) feat. Kostas Hatzis - (Kostas Hatzis – Sotia Tsotou)
3. "Ki ystera" (Κι ύστερα; And afterwards) – (Kostas Hatzis – Sotia Tsotou)
4. "Synora i agapi de gnorizi" (Σύνορα η αγάπη δε γνωρίζει; Love knows no frontier) feat. Kostas Hatzis – (Kostas Hatzis – Sotia Tsotou)
5. "I agapi ola ta ypomeni" (Η αγάπη όλα τα υπομένει; Love withstands all) feat. Kostas Hatzis – (Kostas Hatzis – Sotia Tsotou)
6. "Xechasa na po" (Ξέχασα να πω; I forgot to say) in duet with Kostas Hatzis – (Kostas Hatzis – Danai Stratigopoulou)
7. "Fovame" (Φοβάμαι; I am afraid) in duet with Kostas Hatzis – (Kostas Hatzis – Danai Stratigopoulou)
8. "Trelos i palikari" (Τρελός ή παλικάρι; A madman or a lad) in duet with Kostas Hatzis – (Kostas Hatzis – Sotia Tsotou)
  - These songs (1–8) have been released on Marinella & Kostas Hatzis – Recital.

Side Two.

1. "Mia chameni Kyriaki" (Μια χαμένη Κυριακή; Some lost Sunday) feat. Kostas Hatzis – (Kostas Hatzis-Xenofontas Fileris)
  - This song had been released on Marinella & Kostas Hatzis – To Tam-Tam.
2. "Diri manam' diri" (Ντίρι μάναμ' ντίρι; Diri, diri, my mother) feat. Kostas Hatzis – (Kostas Hatzis-Xenofontas Fileris)
  - This song had been released on Marinella & Kostas Hatzis – To Tam-Tam.
3. "Simera" (Σήμερα; Today) – (Giorgos Hadjinasios-Mimis Theiopoulos)
  - This song had been released on I Marinella Tou Simera.
4. "Proti mou fora" (Πρώτη μου φορά; My first time) – (Nini Zaha)
  - This song had been released on S' Agapo.
5. "Na pezi to tranzistor" (Να παίζει το τρανζίστορ; The transistor radio plays) – (Giorgos Hadjinasios – Michalis Bourboulis)
  - This song had been released on I Marinella Tou Simera.
6. "Gia 'senane boro" (Για 'σένανε μπορώ; For you, I can) – (Antonis Stefanidis – Sotia Tsotou)
  - This song had been released on Marinella – Gia 'Senane Mporo.
7. "Kardoula mou de se malono" (Καρδούλα μου δε σε μαλώνω; My sweetheart, I don't scold you) – (Antonis Stefanidis – Sotia Tsotou)
  - This song had been released on Marinella – Gia 'Senane Mporo.

== Personnel ==
- Marinella – vocals, background vocals
- Kostas Hatzis – background vocals
- The Athenians & Tzavara Twins – background vocals
- Philippos Papatheodorou – producer
- Yiannis Smyrneos – recording engineer
- Alinta Mavrogeni – photographer
