= Ta Erotika (Marinella album) =

Compilation album by Marinella
- Released: 2000 (Greece)
- Recorded: 1974–1987, studio Polysound
- Genre: World music, folk, modern Laika
- Language: Greek
- Label: Universal Music Greece

Marinella chronology
Ta Megala Tragoudia (1999)	Ta Erotika (2000)	Ta Tragoudia Tou Aiona (2000)

Ta Erotika (Greek: Τα ερωτικά; English: Love songs) is a compilation album by Greek singer Marinella under the Universal Music Greece series Ta Erotika. The album is part of the compilation. This album contains Marinella's #1 love songs from 1974 – 1987 in remastered sound. It was first released as a double compilation album, titled Marinella – Gia Panta (Marinella – Forever), in 1988 by PolyGram Greece/Philips in Greece, and was re-released in October, 1994, titled Ta Erotika: Marinella. A new edition of this compilation was re-issued on a 2-CD set in 2000, and in February, 2007 by Universal Music.

== Track listing ==
=== Disc 1 ===
1. "Antio" feat. The Athenians & Tzavara Twins – 3:17 – (Kostas Hatzis – Sotia Tsotou)
  - This song had been released on Marinella & Athenians.
2. "Tha 'thela na isoun (Agapi mou)" feat. The Athenians & Tzavara Twins – 3:34 – (Giorgos Hadjinasios – Nikos Vrettos)
  - This song had been released on Marinella & Athenians.
3. "Ki' ystera" – 2:00 – (Kostas Hatzis – Sotia Tsotou)
  - This song had been released on Marinella Gia Panta.
4. "Ego ki' esy" in duet with Tolis Voskopoulos – 3:24 – (Tolis Voskopoulos – Mimis Theiopoulos)
  - This song had been released on Marinella & Tolis Voskopoulos - Ego Ki' Esy.
5. "Giati fovase (From souvenirs to souvenirs)" – 3:17 – (Stélios Vlavianós – Robert Constandinos – Pythagoras)
  - This song had been released on Marinella Gia Panta.
6. "Tora tipota" feat. The Athenians & Tzavara Twins – 4:27 – (Tolis Voskopoulos – Mimis Theiopoulos)
  - This song had been released on Marinella & Athenians.
7. "O telefteos mou stathmos" – 3:13 – (Giorgos Katsaros – Ilias Lymperopoulos)
  - This song had been released on Marinella & Tolis Voskopoulos - Ego Ki' Esy.
8. "Den ine pou fevgis" – 3:49 – (Giorgos Hadjinasios – Manos Koufianakis)
  - This song had been released on I Marinella Tou Simera.
9. "Simera" – 3:02 – (Giorgos Hadjinasios – Mimis Theiopoulos)
  - This song had been released on I Marinella Tou Simera.
10. "S' agapo (in duet with Tolis Voskopoulos)" – 3:12 – (Philippos Papatheodorou as Giannis Axiotis – Nasos Nanopoulos)
  - This song had been released on S' Agapo.
11. "Proti mou fora" – 3:10 – (Nini Zaha)
  - This song had been released on S' Agapo.
12. "Kardoula mou de se malono" – 3:34 – (Antonis Stefanidis – Sotia Tsotou)
  - This song had been released on Marinella – Gia 'Senane Mporo.
13. "Kalitera" – 3:08 – (Nikos Ignatiadis)
  - This song had been released on S' Agapo.
14. "Pote na mi chathis ap' ti zoi mou" – 3:16 – (Nikos Ignatiadis – Manos Koufianakis)
  - This song had been released on S' Agapo.
15. "Ke mou milas gia monaxia" – 3:19 – (Giorgos Katsaros – Yiannis Parios)
  - This song had been released on S' Agapo.
16. "Gia 'senane mporo" – 2:43 – (Antonis Stefanidis – Sotia Tsotou)
  - This song had been released on Marinella – Gia 'Senane Mporo.

=== Disc 2 ===
1. "I agapi mas" feat. Manolis Lidakis – 2:53 – (Spyros Papavasileiou – Nikos Vrettos)
  - This song had been released on I Agapi Mas.
2. "Xegelo ton kathena" – 3:38 – (Antonis Stefanidis – Sasa Manetta)
  - This song had been released on Marinella – Gia 'Senane Mporo.
3. "Ta mesanichta" – 2:34 – (Antonis Stefanidis – Sotia Tsotou)
  - This song had been released on Marinella – Gia 'Senane Mporo.
4. "Mipos ine erotas" – 3:26 – (Spyros Papavasileiou – Tasos Ikonomou)
  - This song had been released on Marinella – Gia 'Senane Mporo.
5. "Min argis (Moi j'ai mal)" – 4:19 – (Serge Lama – Antonis Stefanidis – Dimitris Iatropoulos)
  - This song had been released on Marinella – Gia 'Senane Mporo.
6. "Ise potami" – 3:34 – (Giorgos Hadjinasios – Michalis Bourboulis)
  - This song had been released on Gia 'Sena Ton Agnosto.
7. "Opos akrivos anaseno" – 3:00 – (Spyros Papavasileiou – Nikos Vrettos)
  - This song had been released on I Agapi Mas.
8. "Kamia fora" – 3:16 – (Giorgos Hadjinasios – Michalis Bourboulis)
  - This song had been released on Gia 'Sena Ton Agnosto.
9. "S' agapo" in duet with Antonis Kalogiannis – 3:29 – (Marios Tokas – Sarantis Alivizatos)
  - This song had been released on Mikra Erotika.
10. "Mpori" – 2:59 – (Alekos Chrysovergis – Spyros Giatrias)
  - This song had been released on I Agapi Mas.
11. "An s' agapousa pio ligo" – 3:47 – (Spyros Papavasileiou – Nikos Vrettos)
  - This song had been released on I Agapi Mas.
12. "Ise pantou ke pouthena" in duet with Kostas Hatzis – 5:18 – (Alexis Papadimitriou – Roni Sofou)
  - This song had been released on I Agapi Mas.
13. "Den pethenis" – 4:05 – (Philippos Papatheodorou as Giannis Axiotis – Alexis Papadimitriou – Sotia Tsotou)
  - This song had been released on Mia Nihta.
14. "Tipota den echi mini" – 3:24 – (Alexis Papadimitriou – Lakis Teazis)
  - This song had been released on Mia Nihta.
15. "Ithaki" feat. Kostas Hatzis – 3:00 – (Kostas Hatzis – Sotia Tsotou)
  - This song had been released on Marinella & Kostas Hatzis - Synantisi.
16. "Tora zo" – 4:11 – (Kostas Hatzis – Giannis Tzouanopoulos)
  - This song had been released on Marinella & Kostas Hatzis - Synantisi.
