= 14 Apo Ta Oreotera Tragoudia Mou =

Compilation album by Marinella
- Released: 1987 (Greece)
- Recorded: 1976–1985
- Studio: Athens
- Genre: World; folk; modern Laika
- Language: Greek
- Label: PolyGram Greece; Philips
- Producer: PolyGram Records

Marinella chronology
Mia Nihta (1986)	14 Apo Ta Oreotera Tragoudia Mou (1987)	Marinella & Kostas Hatzis - Synantisi (1987)

Marinella compilation album chronology
15 Chronia Marinella (1982)	14 Apo Ta Oraiotera Tragoudia Mou (1987)	Marinella For Ever (1988)

Marinella – 14 Apo ta oreotera tragoudia mou (Greek: Μαρινέλλα – 14 Από τα ωραιότερα τραγούδια μου; English: Marinella – 14 From my most beautiful songs) is a compilation of recordings by Greek singer Marinella, under the PolyGram Records – Philips series "14 Apo Ta Oreotera Tragoudia Mou" or "16 Apo Ta Oreotera Tragoudia Mou". This album is part of the compilation. It was released in 1987 in Greece and includes 14 recordings by Marinella from 1976 – 1985 for the PolyGram Records.

== Track listing ==
Side One
No.	Title	Writer(s)	Original album	Length
1.	"Kardoula mou de se malono (Καρδούλα μου δε σε μαλώνω)"	Antonis Stefanidis – Sotia Tsotou	Marinella – Gia 'Senane Mporo
2.	"Ise pantou ke pouthena (Είσαι παντού και πουθενά)" (in duet with Kostas Hatzis)	Alexis Papadimitriou – Argiro Sofou	I Agapi Mas
3.	"Kalinichta (Καληνύχτα)"	Giorgos Krimizakis – Panos Falaras	Marinella – Gia 'Senane Mporo
4.	"Ise potami (Είσαι ποτάμι)"	Giorgos Hadjinasios – Michalis Bourboulis	Gia 'Sena Ton Agnosto
5.	"Ki' ystera (Κι' ύστερα)"	Kostas Hatzis – Sotia Tsotou	Marinella & Kostas Hatzis - Recital
6.	"Bori (Μπορεί)"	Alekos Chrysovergis – Spyros Giatrias	I Agapi Mas
7.	"Ego ki' esy (Εγώ κι' εσύ)" (in duet with Tolis Voskopoulos)	Tolis Voskopoulos – Mimis Theiopoulos	Marinella & Tolis Voskopoulos - Ego Ki' Esy

Side Two
No.	Title	Writer(s)	Original album	Length
1.	"Oli nychta agapiomaste (Όλη νύχτα αγαπιόμαστε)"	Tolis Voskopoulos – Mimis Theiopoulos	Alli Mia Fora
2.	"I agapi mas (Η αγάπη μας)" (feat. Manolis Lidakis)	Spyros Papavasileiou – Nikos Vrettos	I Agapi Mas
3.	"Gia 'senane mporo (Για 'σένανε μπορώ)"	Antonis Stefanidis – Sotia Tsotou	Marinella – Gia 'Senane Mporo
4.	"Ego tha paro kapetanio (Εγώ θα πάρω καπετάνιο)"	Antonis Stefanidis – Sotia Tsotou	Marinella – Gia 'Senane Mporo
5.	"Proti mou fora (Πρώτη μου φορά)"	Nini Zaha	S' Agapo
6.	"Mi me rotas (Μη με ρωτάς)"	Giorgos Hadjinasios – Michalis Bourboulis	Gia 'Sena Ton Agnosto
7.	"S' agapo (Σ'αγαπώ)" (in duet with Tolis Voskopoulos)	Philippos Papatheodorou as Giannis Axiotis – Nasos Nanopoulos	S' Agapo
