= Portreto =

Compilation album by Marinella
- Released: 1980 (Greece)
- Recorded: Athens, 1974–1979
- Genre: World music; folk; modern Laika
- Language: Greek
- Label: PolyGram Greece; Philips
- Producer: PolyGram Records

Marinella chronology
I Marinella Se Tragoudia Tis Vembo (1980)	Portreto (1980)	Marinella & Kostas Hatzis – To Tam-Tam (1980)

Marinella compilation album chronology
Portreta (1976)	Portreto (1980)	15 Chronia Marinella (1982)

Marinella – Portreto (Greek: Μαρινέλλα – Πορτραίτο; Marinella – Portrait) is a compilation of recordings by Greek singer Marinella, under the PolyGram Records – Philips series "Portreto (Portrait)". This album is part of the compilation. It was released in 1980 in Greece and includes 14 recordings by Marinella from 1974 to 1979 for the PolyGram Records.

== Track listing ==
Side one.

1. "Simera" (Σήμερα) – (Giorgos Hadjinasios – Mimis Theiopoulos)
  - This song had been released on I Marinella Tou Simera.
2. "Ego ki esy (Ta logia ine peritta)" (Εγώ κι εσύ) in duet with Tolis Voskopoulos – (Tolis Voskopoulos – Mimis Theiopoulos)
  - This song had been released on Marinella & Tolis Voskopoulos – Ego Ki' Esy.
3. "Kalytera" (Καλύτερα) – (Nikos Ignatiadis)
  - This song had been released on S' Agapo.
4. "Echis liga chronia, echis" (Έχεις λίγα χρόνια, έχεις) – (Giorgos Hadjinasios – Michalis Bourboulis)
  - This song had been released on I Marinella Tou Simera.
5. "Pedi ap' tin Anavysso" (Παιδί απ' την Ανάβυσσο) – (Giorgos Hadjinasios-Michalis Bourboulis)
  - This song had been released on I Marinella Tou Simera.
6. "Avrio" (Αύριο) – (Giorgos Krimizakis – Sotia Tsotou)
  - This song had been released on Marinella Gia Panta.
7. "Ti ki an perasan chronia" (Τι κι αν περάσαν χρόνια) – (Nikos Ignatiadis – Yiannis Parios)
  - This song had been released on S' Agapo.

Side two.

1. "Tha 'thela na isoun" (Θα 'θελα να ήσουν) feat. The Athenians & Tzavara Twins – (Giorgos Hadjinasios – Nikos Vrettos)
  - This song had been released on Marinella & Athenians.
2. "Na pezi to tranzistor" (Να παίζει το τρανζίστορ) – (Giorgos Hadjinasios – Michalis Bourboulis)
  - This song had been released on I Marinella Tou Simera.
3. "Pali ypnos de me piani" (Πάλι ύπνος δε με πιάνει) – (Kostas Hatzis – Sotia Tsotou)
  - This song had been released on Marinella Gia Panta and as a single in 1975.
4. "Antio" (Αντίο) feat. The Athenians & Tzavara Twins – (Kostas Hatzis – Sotia Tsotou)
  - This song had been released on Marinella & Athenians.
5. "Tora tipota" (Τώρα τίποτα) feat. The Athenians & Tzavara Twins – (Tolis Voskopoulos – Mimis Theiopoulos)
  - This song had been released on Marinella & Athenians.
6. "Synora i agapi den gnorizi" (Σύνορα η αγάπη δεν γνωρίζει) feat. Kostas Hatzis – (Kostas Hatzis – Sotia Tsotou)
  - This song had been released on Marinella & Kostas Hatzis – Recital.
7. "I agapi ola ta ypomeni" (Η αγάπη όλα τα υπομένει) feat. Kostas Hatzis – (Kostas Hatzis – Sotia Tsotou)
  - This song had been released on Marinella & Kostas Hatzis – Recital.

== Personnel ==
- Marinella – vocals, background vocals
- Tolis Voskopoulos – vocals
- Kostas Hatzis – background vocals
- Yiannis Smyrneos – recording engineer
- Alinta Mavrogeni – photographer
- PolyGram Records – producer
