= Portreta =

Portraita

Compilation album by Marinella
- Released: 1976
- Recorded: Athens, 1968 – 1975
- Genre: World music, Folk, Modern Laika
- Language: Greek
- Label: PolyGram Greece, Philips
- Producer: PolyGram Records

Marinella chronology
Marinella & Kostas Hatzis - Recital (1976)	Portraita (1976)	Alli Mia Fora (1976)

Marinella compilation album chronology
Ta Oraiotera Tragoudia Mou (1974)	Portreta (1976)	Portreto (1980)

Marinella – Portreta (Greek: Μαρινέλλα – Πορτραίτα; Marinella – Portraits) is a compilation of recordings by Greek singer Marinella, under the PolyGram Records–Philips series "Portreta (Portraits)". This album is part of the compilation. It was released in 1976 in Greece and includes 14 recordings by Marinella from 1968 to 1975 for PolyGram Records.

== Track listing ==
Side one.

1. "Krasi, thalassa ke t' agori mou" (Κρασί, θάλασσα και τ' αγόρι μου) – (G.Katsaros – Pythagoras) – (ESC 1974 Greek entry)
  - This song had been released as a single on 19 March 1974.
2. "Pou pane ekina ta pedia (My reason)" (Πού πάνε εκείνα τα παιδιά) – (Stélios Vlavianós – Charis Chalkitis – Pythagoras)
  - This song had been released on Marinella Gia Panta and as a single on 17 January 1973.
3. "Enan kero" (Έναν καιρό) – (Christos Leontis – Sotia Tsotou)
  - This song had been released on 12 Para Pente in 1971 and as a single on 18 October 1972.
4. "Drigi, drigi, mana mou (Velvet mornings)" (Ντρίγκι, ντρίγκι, μάνα μου) – (Stélios Vlavianós – Robert Constandinos – Pythagoras)
  - This song had been released on Mia Vradia Me Tin Marinella No. 2. The studio version appears on Marinella Gia Panta.
5. "Pallikari mou" (Παλικάρι μου) – (Stavros Xarchakos – Nikos Gatsos)
  - This song had been released on Mia Vradia Me Tin Marinella No. 2.
6. "Ola ine tichera" (Όλα είναι τυχερά) – (Stavros Xarchakos – Nikos Gatsos)
  - This song had been released on Mia Vradia Me Tin Marinella No. 2. The original studio version appears on Marinella Gia Panta.
7. "Kita me sta matia" (Κοίτα με στα μάτια) – (Akis Panou)
  - This song had been released as a single on 13 April 1971.

Side two.

1. "Fevgi i chara" (Φεύγει η χαρά) – (Vaggelis Pitsiladis – Lefteris Papadopoulos)
  - This song had been released as a single on 22 February 1968.
2. "O telefteos mou stathmos" (Ο τελευταίος μου σταθμός) – (Giorgos Katsaros – Ilias Lymperopoulos)
  - This song had been released on Marinella & Tolis Voskopoulos – Ego Ki' Esy.
3. "Lessa gia lessa" (Λέσσα για λέσσα) – (Giorgos Hadjinasios – Sevi Tiliakou)
  - This song had been released as a single on 18 June 1973.
4. "Dio pedia ap' to Vrachori" (Δυο παιδιά απ' το Βραχώρι) – (Giorgos Katsaros – Pythagoras)
  - This song had been released on Albania.
5. "Mana mou kripse to spathi" (Μάνα μου κρύψε το σπαθί) – (Giorgos Katsaros – Pythagoras)
  - This song had been released on Albania.
6. "Giati fovase (From souvenirs to souvenirs)" (Γιατί φοβάσαι) – (Stélios Vlavianós – Robert Constandinos – Pythagoras)
  - This song had been released on Marinella Gia Panta.
7. "Ki ystera" (Κι ύστερα) – (Kostas Hatzis – Sotia Tsotou)
  - This song had been released on Marinella Gia Panta and as a single in 1975.

== Personnel ==
- Marinella – vocals, background vocals
- Yiannis Smyrneos – recording engineer
- Alinta Mavrogeni – photographer
- PolyGram Records – producer
