= Live (Marinella & Antonis Remos album) =

Live album by Marinella and Antonis Remos
- Released: December 2007
- Recorded: Athens Arena, 2006 - 2007
- Genre: World music; Folk; Modern Laika; Pop
- Length: 2:11:42
- Language: Greek
- Label: Sony BMG Greece; Columbia; Minos EMI

Marinella chronology
Tipota Den Ginete Tihea (2005)	Marinella & Antonis Remos – Live (2007)

Antonis Remos chronology
Best of (2006)	Marinella & Antonis Remos – Live (2007)	Alithies & Psemata (2008)

Marinella & Antonis Remos – Live is the name of a live album by Greek singers Marinella and Antonis Remos. It is their first joint live album, was recorded at the Athens Arena and was released in December 2007 by Sony BMG Greece and Minos EMI. The album went Platinum selling over 30,000 units.

== Track listing ==
=== Disc 1 ===
1. "Ego ki esy (Ta logia ine peritta)" (Εγώ κι εσύ) – (Tolis Voskopoulos - Mimis Theiopoulos) – 4:42
2. "Etsi xafnika" (Έτσι ξαφνικά) – (Antonis Vardis - Gioula Georgiou) – 3:10
3. "Ise pantou ke pouthena" (Είσαι παντού και πουθενά) – (Alexis Papadimitriou - Argiro Sofou) / "Ego ki esy (Instrumental)" (Tolis Voskopoulos - Mimis Theiopoulos) – 3:24
4. "Mi fygis" (Μη φύγεις) – (Giorgos Theofanous) – 6:44
5. "Signomi" (Συγγνώμη) – (Giorgos Theofanous) – 4:07
6. "Gia ekato zoes akoma (Per altre centro vite ancora)" (Για εκατό ζωές ακόμα) – (Giorgos Theofanous - Massimo Di Cataldo) – 2:19
7. "Meine ligo stin grammi" (Μείνε λίγο στην γραμμή) – (Giorgos Theofanous) – 4:28
8. "Me tin porta anichti" (Με την πόρτα ανοιχτή) – (Kyriakos Papadopoulos - Giannis Doxas) – 4:18
9. "Mia anapnoi" (Μια αναπνοή) – (Giorgos Theofanous) – 3:20
10. "Tremo" (Τρέμω) – (Giorgos Theofanous) – 3:14
11. "Tha 'prepe" (Θα 'πρεπε) – (Giorgos Theofanous) – 4:37
12. "Pou na 'se" (Πού να 'σαι) – (Giorgos Theofanous) – 4:47
13. "Apopse se thelo (Instrumental intro)" (Απόψε σε θέλω) – (Mimis Plessas - Lefteris Papadopoulos) – 1:20
14. "Apopse se thelo" (Απόψε σε θέλω) – (Mimis Plessas - Lefteris Papadopoulos) – 2:11
15. "Giati fovase (From souvenirs to souvenirs)" (Γιατί φοβάσαι;) – (Stélios Vlavianós - Robert Constandinos - Pythagoras) – 2:33
16. "Den ine pou fevgis" (Δεν είναι που φεύγεις) – (Giorgos Hadjinasios - Manos Koufianakis) – 2:55
17. "On Broadway (Intro)" – (Barry Mann - Cynthia Weil - J.Leiber-M.Stoller) / "Na pezi to tranzistor" (Να παίζει το τρανζίστορ) – (Giorgos Hadjinasios-Michalis Bourboulis) – 4:01
18. "Den eim' ego" (Δεν είμ' εγώ) – (Kostas Hatzis - Sotia Tsotou) – 3:04
19. "Antio" (Αντίο) – (Kostas Hatzis - Sotia Tsotou) / "Tha 'thela na isoun" (Θα 'θελα να ήσουν) – (Giorgos Hadjinasios - Nikos Vrettos) – 3:30
20. "Dos' mou to athanato nero" (Δώσ' μου τ' αθάνατο νερό) – (Mimis Plessas - Akos Daskalopoulos) – 4:32

=== Disc 2 ===
1. "Ti na ftei" (Τι να φταίει) – (Giorgos Zampetas - Dimitris Christodoulou) / "Zografismena sto charti" (Ζωγραφισμένα στο χαρτί) – Mimis Plessas - Akos Daskalopoulos / "Pios ein' aftos" (Ποιος είν' αυτός) – (Giorgos Zampetas - Pythagoras) – 7:29
2. "Pote na mi chathis ap' ti zoi mou" (Ποτέ να μη χαθείς απ' τη ζωή μου) – (Nikos Ignatiadis - Manos Koufianakis) – 3:40
3. "Sinora i agapi den gnorizei" (Σύνορα η αγάπη δεν γνωρίζει) – (Kostas Hatzis - Sotia Tsotou) – 3:08
4. "Pali tha klapso" (Πάλι θα κλάψω) – (Nakis Petridis - Sevi Tiliakou) / "Ama dite to feggari" (Άμα δείτε το φεγγάρι) – (Mimis Plessas - Lefteris Papadopoulos) / "I agapi ola ta ypomeni" (Η αγάπη όλα τα υπομένει) - (Kostas Hatzis - Sotia Tsotou) – 6:02
5. "Kamia fora" (Καμιά φορά) - (Giorgos Hadjinasios - Michalis Bourboulis) – 3:57
6. "Etsi ine i agapi" (Έτσι είναι η αγάπη) - (Giorgos Theofanous) – 2:42
7. "Stalia - stalia" (Σταλιά - σταλιά) – (Giorgos Zampetas - Dionisis Tzefronis) / "Pou na pige tosi agapi" (Πού να πήγε τόση αγάπη;) – (Nikos Papadopoulos - Ilias Philippou) – 4:08
8. "Den tha ksanagapiso" (Δεν θα ξαναγαπήσω) – (Manos Loïzos - Lefteris Papadopoulos) / "Alla mou len' ta matia sou" (Άλλα μου λεν' τα μάτια σου) – (Theodoros Derveniotis - Kostas Manesis) / "Kato ap' to poukamiso mou" (Κάτω απ' το πουκάμισο μου) – (Christos Nikolopoulos - Pythagoras) – 8:07
9. "Anapse to tsigaro" (Άναψε το τσιγάρο) - (Gerasimos Klouvatos - Charalampos Vasiliadis) – 2:27
10. "Oso aksizis esy" (Όσο αξίζεις εσύ) – (Apostolos Kaldaras) / "Fevgo gia sou, gia sou" (Φεύγω, γεια σου, γεια σου) – (Panos Gavalas - Fotis Zisoulis) / "Ama thes na klapsis, klapse" (Άμα θες να κλάψεις, κλάψε) – (Apostolos Kaldaras - Giorgos Samoladas) – 2:58
11. "Ti ekana gia parti mou" (Τι έκανα για πάρτη μου) – (Thanasis Polykandriotis - Fotini Dourou) / "Tora pou fevgo ap' ti zoi" (Τώρα που φεύγω απ' τη ζωή) – (Stelios Kazantzidis - Eftychia Papagianopoulou) / "O gialinos kosmos" (Ο γυάλινος κόσμος) – (Apostolos Kaldaras - Eftychia Papagianopoulou) – 5:01
12. "O,ti agapao ego petheni" (Ό,τι αγαπάω εγώ πεθαίνει) – (Apostolos Kaldaras - Giorgos Samoladas) – 4:35
13. "Anixe petra" (Άνοιξε πέτρα) – (Mimis Plessas - Lefteris Papadopoulos) – 2:36
14. "Ela na me teliosis" (Έλα να με τελειώσεις) – (Giorgos Theofanous) – 1:31
15. "I thalassini (Naftaki Syriano)" (Οι θαλασσινοί) – (Giorgos Zampetas - Stelios Geranis) – 2:05

== Charts ==
Chart	Providers	Peak position	Weeks on charts	Certification
Greek Albums Chart	IFPI	2	14	Platinum
Top 50 Greek Albums of 2008	IFPI	45	-	-
Cypriot Album Chart	All Records Top 20			
