= Ta Oreotera Tragoudia Mou =

Compilation album by Marinella
- Released: 1974
- Recorded: Athens, 1967 – 1972
- Genre: World music, Folk, Modern Laika
- Language: Greek
- Label: PolyGram Greece, Philips
- Producer: PolyGram Records

Marinella chronology
Marinella & Tolis Voskopoulos – Ego Ki' Esy (1974)	Ta Oreotera Tragoudia Mou (1974)	Marinella Gia Panta (1975)

Marinella compilation album chronology
Ta Oreotera Tragoudia Mou (1974)	Portreta (1976)

Marinella – Ta oreotera tragoudia mou (Greek: Μαρινέλλα – Τα ωραιότερα τραγούδια μου; Marinella – My most beautiful songs) is a compilation of recordings by Greek singer Marinella, under the PolyGram Records – Philips series "Ta Oreotera Tragoudia Mou". It was released in 1974 in Greece and includes 14 recordings by Marinella from 1967 to 1972 for the PolyGram label.

== Track listing ==
Side one.

1. "Apopse se thelo" (Απόψε σε θέλω; Tonight I want you) – (Mimis Plessas – Lefteris Papadopoulos)
  - This song had been released on Otan Simani Esperinos and as a single on 7 July 1969.
2. "Stalia – stalia" (Σταλιά – σταλιά; Drop by drop) – (Giorgos Zampetas – Dionisis Tzefronis)
  - This song had been released on Stalia – Stalia and as a single on 11 March 1968.
3. "Ti na ftei" (Τι να φταίει; What is wrong?) – (Giorgos Zampetas – Dimitris Christodoulou)
  - This song had been released on Otan Simani Esperinos and as a single on 10 June 1969.
4. "Anixe petra (na kleisto)" (Άνοιξε πέτρα; Open, stone) – (Mimis Plessas-Lefteris Papadopoulos)
  - This song had been released on Stalia – Stalia and as a single on 11 November 1968.
5. "Otan simani Esperinos" (Όταν σημάνει Εσπερινός; When the Vesper bells are ringing) – (Nakis Petridis – Sevi Tiliakou)
  - This song had been released on Otan Simani Esperinos and as a single on 15 February 1969.
6. "Pali tha klapso" (Πάλι θα κλάψω; Again, I will cry) – (Nakis Petridis – Sevi Tiliakou)
  - This song had been released on Ena Tragoudi Ein' I Zoi Mou and as a single on 5 December 1969.
7. "Pios in' aftos" (Ποιος είν' αυτός; Who is this guy?) – (Giorgos Zampetas-Pythagoras)
  - This song had been released on Stalia – Stalia and as a single on 30 November 1968.

Side two.

1. "Piretos (Kathe gnorimia)" (Πυρετός; Fever) – (Akis Panou)
  - This song had been released as a single on 13 April 1971. A live version appears on Mia Vradia Me Tin Marinella.
2. "Simvivazomaste" (Συμβιβαζόμαστε; We're compromising) – (Giorgos Hadjinasios – Tasos Economou)
  - This song had been released as a single on 27 March 1972. A live version appears on Mia Vradia Me Tin Marinella.
3. "I antres den klene" (Οι άντρες δεν κλαίνε; Men don't cry) – (Giorgos Katsaros – Pythagoras)
  - This song had been released on Stalia – Stalia and as a single on 16 February 1968.
4. "Piso apo tis kalamies" (Πίσω από τις καλαμιές; Behind the reeds) – (Giorgos Katsaros – Pythagoras)
  - This song had been released on Stalia – Stalia and as a single on 21 December 1967.
5. "Katigoro" (Κατηγορώ; I blame) – (Giorgos Hadjinasios – Giannis Politis)
  - This song had been released on Marinella – Enas mythos and as a single on 2 September 1970.
6. "Akouste" – (Ακούστε; Harken) – (Giorgos Katsaros – Pythagoras)
  - This song had been released as a single on 12 January 1972. A live version appears on Mia Vradia Me Tin Marinella.
7. "Krima to mpoi sou" (Κρίμα το μπόι σου; Shame on your height) – (Giorgos Hadjinasios-Sevi Tiliakou)
  - This song had been released on Marinella (Enas mythos) and as a single on 14 May 1970.

== Personnel ==
- Marinella – vocals, background vocals
- Marios Kostoglou – background vocals on tracks 13 and 14
- Yiannis Smyrneos – recording engineer
- PolyGram Records – producer
