= Alli Mia Fora (Marinella album) =

Studio album by Marinella
- Released: 6 October 1976 (Greece)
- Recorded: Athens, 1976, studio Polysound
- Genre: World music; folk; modern Laika
- Length: 35:13
- Language: Greek
- Label: PolyGram Greece; Philips
- Producer: Philippos Papatheodorou

Marinella chronology
Portraita (1976)	Alli Mia Fora (1976)	Marinella & Athenians (1977)

Marinella studio album chronology
Marinella & Kostas Hatzis – Recital (1976)	Alli Mia Fora (1976)	Marinella & Athenians (1977)

Alli mia fora… (Greek: Άλλη μια φορά…; Once again…) is the name of a studio album by Greek singer Marinella. It was released on 6 October 1976 by PolyGram Records in Greece, but the album was quickly withdrawn and re-release in 1991 with a new cover pasted over the original. The reason why the album was taken off the market was because the impact of the previous album, Marinella & Kostas Hatzis – Recital, was so great, that Marinella decided that it would be inappropriate to release another album that would resemble with the genre of Recital.

== Track listing ==
Side one.

1. "Tha tragoudiso" (Θα τραγουδήσω; I will sing) – (Tolis Voskopoulos – Mimis Theiopoulos) – 2:51
  - A second studio version of this song had been recorded in 1977 and appears on Marinella & Athenians.
2. "Afise me na s' agapo" (Άφησέ με να σ' αγαπώ; Let me love you) – (Stelios Zafeiriou – Mimis Theiopoulos) – 3:08
  - A second studio version of this song had been recorded in 1977 and appears on Marinella & Athenians.
3. "Meta apo tosa chronia chorismo" (Μετά από τόσα χρόνια χωρισμό; After many years of separation) – (Nini Zaha) – 3:19
4. "Sto voria, sto notia" (Στο βοριά, στο νοτιά; In the north, in the south) – (Teris Ieremias – Mimis Theiopoulos) – 2:12
5. "Tora pou se chano s' agapao" (Τώρα που σε χάνω σ' αγαπάω; I love you now that I'm losing you) – (Stelios Zafeiriou – Sotia Tsotou) – 2:47
6. "S' agapo" (Σ' αγαπώ; I love you) – (Nini Zaha) – 2:31

Side two.

1. "Tora tipota" (Τώρα τίποτα; Now, nothing) – (Tolis Voskopoulos – Mimis Theiopoulos) – 4:25
  - A second studio version of this song had been recorded in 1977 and appears on Marinella & Athenians.
2. "To parathyro klisto" (Το παράθυρο κλειστό; The window is closed) – (Teris Ieremias – Mimis Theiopoulos) – 2:41
3. "Oli nichta agapiomaste" (Όλη νύχτα αγαπιόμαστε; All night we're loving) – (Tolis Voskopoulos – Mimis Theiopoulos) – 2:25
  - After album's withdrawal, this song had been re-released on compilation Marinella – 14 Apo Ta Oraiotera Tragoudia Mou.
4. "Chameni" (Χαμένη; Lost) – (Nini Zaha) – 3:00
5. "Se yirevo" (Σε γυρεύω; I'm looking for you) – (Stelios Zafeiriou – Philippos Nikolaou) – 3:36
6. "Alli mia fora" (Άλλη μια φορά; Once again) – (Teris Ieremias – Mimis Theiopoulos) – 4:18

== Personnel ==
- Marinella – vocals, background vocals
- Philippos Papatheodorou – producer
- Kostas Klavvas – arranger, conductor
- Yiannis Smyrneos – recording engineer
