= Daniela Hatzi =

- Born: June 11, 2003 (age 23); Athens, Greece
- Origin: Greece
- Genres: Pop, ethnic music, ballad
- Occupations: Singer, songwriter, composer
- Instruments: Vocals, handpan, piano
- Years active: 2015–present

Daniela Hatzi (born 11 June 2003 in Athens) is a Greek-French singer, songwriter, and composer of Romani descent.

== Career ==
Daniela Hatzi began her musical career performing alongside her father, Greek singer Kostas Hatzis. She first performed in front of an audience at the age of five at the Hellenic American Union in Athens.

Throughout her career, she has collaborated with several prominent figures in the Greek music scene, including Giorgos Theofanous, Mario Frangoulis, Konstantinos Argiros, Elpida, Giorgos Katsaros, Giannis Kotsiras, Takis Zacharatos, and Giorgos Gerolymatos.
