= Marinella (1971 album) =

Marinella (Ena mythos)

Studio album by Marinella
- Released: 24 February 1971
- Recorded: Athens, 1970 - 1971, studio Polysound
- Genre: World music; folk; Modern Laika; Éntekhno
- Length: 35:05
- Language: Greek
- Label: PolyGram Greece; Philips
- Producer: PolyGram Records

Marinella chronology
Ena Karavi Gemato Tragoudia (1971)	Marinella (Ena mythos) (1971)	Mia Vradia Me Tin Marinella (1972)

Singles from Marinella (Ena mythos)
- 1. "Krima to mpoi sou" Released: 14 May 1970; 2. "Katigoro" Released: 2 August 1970; 3. "Vale pioto" Released: 20 October 1970; 4. "Kyra Giorgena/42 Maniatisses" Released: 21 December 1970; 5. "42 Maniatisses/Apopse mou ton pirane" Released: 21 December 1970

Marinella - Enas mythos (Greek: Μαρινέλλα - Ένας μύθος; English: Marinella - A tale) is a studio album by Greek singer Marinella. It was released on 24 February 1971 by PolyGram Records in Greece. This album was issued in mono and stereo. The stereo version of this album was released on CD in 1994 by PolyGram, with six bonus tracks.

== Track listing ==
Side one.

1. "Enas mythos" (Ένας μύθος; A tale) – (Manos Hadjidakis - Thrasyvoulos Stavrou) – 3:46
  - A second studio version of this song had been recorded in 1984 and appears on Megales Stigmes.
2. "Krima to mpoi sou" (Κρίμα το μπόι σου; Shame on your height) – (Giorgos Hadjinasios - Sevi Tiliakou) – 2:57
3. "Sarantadio Maniatisses" (Σαρανταδυό Μανιάτισσες; Forty-two women from Mani) – (Giorgos Katsaros - Pythagoras) – 3:29
4. "Apopse mou ton pirane" (Απόψε μου τον πήρανε; Tonight they took him from me) – (Giorgos Katsaros - Pythagoras) – 2:47
5. "O tachidromos pethane" (Ο ταχυδρόμος πέθανε; The postman is dead) – (Manos Hadjidakis) – 3:57
6. "I kyra Giorgena" (Η κυρά Γιώργαινα; Wife of George) – (Giorgos Katsaros - Pythagoras) – 2:58
  - A second studio version of this song had been recorded in the same year and appears on soundtrack album Ena Karavi Gemato Tragoudia. Also, a live version had been recorded in October, 1970 and appears on V Festival Internacional Da Canção Popular - Rio (Parte Internacional).

Side two.

1. "Katigoro" (Κατηγορώ; I blame) – (Giorgos Hadjinasios - Giannis Politis) – 2:52
2. "Odos oneiron" (Οδός ονείρων; Street of dreams) – (Manos Hadjidakis) – 3:20
  - A second studio version of this song had been recorded in 1984 and appears on Megales Stigmes.
3. "23 Aprilides" (23 Απρίληδες; 23 Aprils) – (Nakis Petridis - Sevi Tiliakou) – 3:13
4. "Ki' ego de milisa" (Κι' εγώ δεν μίλησα; And I spoke not) – (Nakis Petridis - Sevi Tiliakou) – 3:18
5. "Vale pioto" (Βάλε πιοτό; Pour some drink) – (Giorgos Zampetas - Pythagoras) – 2:42
6. "Dirlada" (Ντιρλαντά; Darla dirladada) – (Traditional song of Kalymnos, adaptation by Pantelis Ginis) – 3:10
  - A second studio version of this song had been recorded in the same year and appears on soundtrack album Ena Karavi Gemato Tragoudia.

Bonus tracks on the CD re-issue.

1. "Nichtoperpatimata" (Νυχτοπερπατήματα; Nightlife) – (Giorgos Hadjinasios - Tasos Economou) – 2:43
  - This song had been released as a single on September 2, 1970. A live version appears on Mia Vradia Me Tin Marinella.
2. "Simvivazomaste" (Συμβιβαζόμαστε; We're compromising) – (Giorgos Hadjinasios - Tasos Economou) – 3:27
  - This song had been released as a single on March 27, 1972. A live version appears on Mia Vradia Me Tin Marinella.
3. "To petsino sakaki" (Το πέτσινο σακάκι; The leather jacket) – (Giorgos Katsaros - Pythagoras) – 2:41
  - This song had been released on soundtrack album Ena Karavi Gemato Tragoudia in 1971 and as single on March 2, 1972.
4. "I lefka" (Η λεύκα; The poplar) – (Giorgos Katsaros - Pythagoras) – 3:12
  - This song had been released on soundtrack album Ena Karavi Gemato Tragoudia in 1971 and as single on March 2, 1972.
5. "Ine megalos o Theos" (Είναι μεγάλος ο Θεός; God is great) – (Giorgos Katsaros - Pythagoras) – 3:18
  - This song had been released on soundtrack album Ena Karavi Gemato Tragoudia in 1971.
6. "Chtipa kampana" (Χτύπα καμπάνα; Oh, ring bell) – (Giorgos Katsaros - Pythagoras) – 3:24
  - This song had been released on soundtrack album Ena Karavi Gemato Tragoudia in 1971.

== Personnel ==
- Marinella - vocals, background vocals
- Marios Kostoglou - background vocals on tracks 2 and 11
- PolyGram Records - producer
