= Marinella Gia Panta =

Studio album by Marinella
- Released: 30 June 1975
- Recorded: Athens, studio Polysound, 1975
- Genre: World music, Folk, Modern Laika
- Length: 33:27
- Language: Greek
- Label: PolyGram Greece, Philips
- Producer: Philippos Papatheodorou

Marinella chronology
Marinella & Tolis Voskopoulos – Ego Ki' Esy (1974)	Marinella Gia Panta (1975)	Marinella & Kostas Hatzis – Recital (1976)

Marinella gia panta (Greek: Μαρινέλλα για πάντα; Marinella forever) is the name of a studio album by popular Greek singer Marinella. It was released on 30 June 1975 by PolyGram Records in Greece. The original release was in stereo on vinyl, cassette and 8-track tape, under the label of Philips Records. The album was reissued in 1991 by Polygram with new artwork. In the form of the 1991 reissue, the album was released on CD in 1996, under the label of Mercury Records, with six bonus tracks that were released in 1973 – 1974 by Polygram.

== Track listing ==
Side one.

1. "Ki' apopse tipota" (Κι' απόψε τίποτα; Nothing tonight either) – (Stelios Zafeitiou – Pythagoras) – 2:39
2. "San kapios thiasos" (Σαν κάποιος θίασος; Just like a troupe of actors) – (Giorgos Krimizakis – Sotia Tsotou) – 3:04
3. "Ki' ystera" (Κι' ύστερα; And afterwards) – (Kostas Hatzis – Sotia Tsotou) – 2:00
4. "Posa ida" (Πόσα είδα; How much have I seen) – (Giorgos Krimizakis – Sotia Tsotou) – 3:25
5. "Giati Fovase (From souvenirs to souvenirs)" (Γιατί φοβάσαι; Why do you dread?) – (Stélios Vlavianós – Robert Constandinos – Pythagoras) – 2:29
6. "Avrio" (Αύριο; Tomorrow) – (Giorgos Krimizakis – Sotia Tsotou) – 3:08

Side two.

1. "Pali ypnos de me piani" (Πάλι ύπνος δε με πιάνει; Once again I cannot sleep) – (Kostas Hatzis – Sotia Tsotou) – 2:50
2. "Ki' opos pai" (Κι' όπως πάει; And as it goes) – (Charis Lymperopoulos – Sotia Tsotou) – 3:03
3. "Kaname lathi" (Κάναμε λάθη; We made mistakes) – (Stelios Zafeiriou – Pythagoras) – 3:07
4. "Oute enas" (Ούτε ένας; Not even one) – (Giorgos Katsaros – Pythagoras) – 2:51
  - This song had been released in 1974, on Marinella & Tolis Voskopoulos – Ego Ki' Esy.
5. "O telefteos mou stathmos" (Ο τελευταίος μου σταθμός; My last station) – (Giorgos Katsaros – Ilias Lymperopoulos) – 3:14
  - This song had been released in 1974, on Marinella & Tolis Voskopoulos – Ego Ki' Esy.
6. "Stamata kosme" – (Σταμάτα κόσμε; Stop, world) – (Charis Lymperopoulos – Sotia Tsotou) – 2:57

Bonus tracks on the CD re-issue.

1. "Drigi, drigi, mana mou (Velvet mornings)" (Ντρίγκι, ντρίγκι, μάνα μου; Drigi, drigi, my mother) – (Stélios Vlavianós – Robert Constandinos – Pythagoras) – 3:06
  - This song had been released on Mia Vradia Me Tin Marinella No. 2. The original studio version had been released as a single on January 17, 1973.
2. "Pou pane ekina ta pedia? (My reason)" (Πού πάνε εκείνα τα παιδιά; Where are going those young men?) – (Stélios Vlavianós – Charis Chalkitis – Pythagoras) – 3:24
  - This song had been released as a single on January 17, 1973.
3. "Ke tora" (Και τώρα; And now) – (Mimis Plessas – Ilias Lymperopoulos) – 2:40
  - This song had been released as a single on January 19, 1973.
4. "Anapoda metras" (Ανάποδα μετράς; You count backward) – (Giorgos Hadjinasios – Sevi Tiliakou) – 2:44
  - This song had been released as a single on June 18, 1973.
5. "Lessa gia lessa" (Λέσσα για λέσσα; Lessa gia lessa) – (Giorgos Hadjinasios – Sevi Tiliakou) – 2:39
  - This song had been released as a single on June 18, 1973.
6. "Krasi, thalassa ke t' agori mou" (Κρασί, θάλασσα και τ' αγόρι μου; Wine, sea and my boyfriend) – (Giorgos Katsaros – Pythagoras) – (ESC 1974 Greek entry) – 3:01
  - This song had been released as a single on March 19, 1974.

== Personnel ==
- Marinella – vocals, background vocals
- Philippos Papatheodorou – producer
- Kostas Klavvas – arranger and conductor on tracks 1, 3, 5, 7 and 9
- Giorgos Katsaros – arranger and conductor on tracks 10 and 11
- Haris Lymperopoulos – arranger on tracks 8 and 12
- Giorgos Krimizakis – arranger on tracks 2, 4 and 6
- Yiannis Smyrneos – recording engineer
- Alinta Mavrogeni – photographer
- Petros Paraschis – artwork (1991 reissue)
