= Ta Erotika =

Ta Erotika may refer to:

- Ta Erotika (Marinella album)
- Ta Erotika (Sakis Rouvas album)
