= Mia Nihta =

Studio album by Marinella
- Released: 11 April 1986 (Greece)
- Recorded: Athens, 1986
- Genre: World music; folk; pop
- Length: 30:04
- Language: Greek
- Label: PolyGram Greece; Philips
- Producer: Philippos Papatheodorou

Marinella chronology
I Agapi Mas (1985)	Mia Nihta (1986)	14 Apo Ta Oraiotera Tragoudia Mou (1987)

Marinella studio album chronology
I Agapi Mas (1985)	Mia Nihta (1986)	Marinella & Kostas Hatzis – Synantisi (1987)

Mia ni(c)hta… (Greek: Μια νύχτα…; One night…) is the name of a studio album by Greek singer Marinella. It was released on 11 April 1986 by PolyGram Records in Greece. This album was issued in mono and stereo. The stereo version of this album was released on CD in 1995 by PolyGram.

== Track listing ==
Side one.

1. "Den pethenis" (Δεν πεθαίνεις; You don't die) – (Philippos Papatheodorou as Giannis Axiotis – Alexis Papadimitriou – Sotia Tsotou) – 4:05
2. "An den ta zousame" (Αν δεν τα ζούσαμε; If we had not lived) – (Nini Zaha) – 3:12
3. "I agapi mas telioni" (Η αγάπη μας τελειώνει; Our love is coming to an end) – (Alexis Papadimitriou – Philippos Papatheodorou as Giannis Axiotis – Alkistis Gkogkou) – 3:07
4. "Ime i Meri" (Είμαι η Μαίρη; I am Mary) – (Alexis Papadimitriou – Sotia Tsotou) – 3:05
5. "Plisa to kefali" (Ψηλά το κεφάλι; Head up) – (Nini Zaha) – 2:54

Side two.

1. "Ap' tin odo Athinas" (Απ' την οδό Αθηνάς; From Athena's Street) – (Philippos Papatheodorou as Giannis Axiotis – Alexis Papadimitriou – Mari Moraiti) – 3:34
2. "Tipota den echi mini" (Τίποτα δεν έχει μείνει; Nothing is left) – (Alexis Papadimitriou – Lakis Teazis) – 3:24
3. "Ι Ellada faltsa zi" (Η Ελλάδα φάλτσα ζει; Greece is living with discordance) – (Alexis Papadimitriou – Giannis Tzouanopoulos) – 2:35
4. "Tora ego" (Τώρα εγώ; Now, for myself) – (Nini Zaha) – 2:54
5. "Mia nichta" (Μια νύχτα; Some night) – (Philippos Papatheodorou as Giannis Axiotis – Alexis Papadimitriou – Mari Moraiti) – 2:34

== Album credits ==
- Marinella – vocals, background vocals
- Philippos Papatheodorou – producer
- Haris Andreadis – arranger, conductor
- Yiannis Smyrneos – recording engineer
- Dinos Diamantopoulos – photographer
- Petros Paraschis – artwork
- Spyros Stergiou – sketch
