= Marinella & Athenians =

Studio album by Marinella
- Released: 26 July 1977
- Recorded: Athens, 1977, studio Polysound
- Genre: World music; folk; Éntekhno
- Length: 37:14
- Language: Greek
- Label: PolyGram Greece; Philips
- Producer: Philippos Papatheodorou

Marinella chronology
Alli Mia Fora (1976)	Marinella & Athenians (1977)	I Marinella Tou Simera (1978)

Marinella & Athenians (Greek: Μαρινέλλα & Αθηναίοι) is a studio album by Greek singer Marinella. It was released on 26 July 1977 by PolyGram Records in Greece and it went gold selling over 50,000 units. Marinella was accompanied by the Greek musical group of The Athenians (by Philippos Papatheodorou, Kostas Trouptsios, Spyros Livieratos) and Tzavara Twins (Nikos and Giorgos Tzavaras). This album was issued in mono and stereo. The stereo version of this album was released on CD in 1995 by PolyGram.

== Track listing ==
Side one.

1. "Antio" – (Αντίο; Good-bye) – (Kostas Hatzis – Sotia Tsotou) – 3:17
2. "Ke tora ti echis na pis" (Και τώρα τι έχεις να πεις; What do you have to say now?) – (Nini Zaha) – 2:58
3. "Tha 'thela na isoun (Agapi mou)" (Θα 'θελα να ήσουν; I'd like you to be) – (Giorgos Hadjinasios – Nikos Vrettos) – 3:34
4. "I galaria" (Η γαλαρία; The balcony) – (Kostas Hatzis – Sotia Tsotou) – 2:19
5. "Ine aplo" (Είναι απλό; It is simple) – (Kostas Hatzis – Mimis Theiopoulos) – 2:41
6. "Afise me na s' agapo" (Άφησέ με να σ' αγαπώ; Let me love you) – (Stelios Zafeiriou – Mimis Theiopoulos) – 3:14
  - The first studio version of this song had been released on Alli Mia Fora.

Side two.

1. "Tora tipota" (Τώρα τίποτα; Now, nothing) – (Tolis Voskopoulos – Mimis Theiopoulos) – 4:27
  - The first studio version of this song had been released on Alli Mia Fora.
2. "Pare me konta sou" (Πάρε με κοντά σου; Take me close to you) – (Giorgos Hadjinasios – Michalis Bourboulis) – 3:30
3. "Tha tragoudiso" (Θα τραγουδήσω; I will sing) – (Tolis Voskopoulos – Mimis Theiopoulos) – 2:55
  - The first studio version of this song had been released on Alli Mia Fora.
4. "Anthropi – anthropi" (Άνθρωποι – άνθρωποι; People – people) – (Nini Zaha – Sotia Tsotou) – 3:16
5. "Den eim' ego" (Δεν είμ' εγώ; It isn't me) – (Kostas Hatzis – Sotia Tsotou) – 3:37
6. "Svise to fos" (Σβήσε το φως; Switch off the light) – (Philippos Papatheodorou as Giannis Axiotis – Sotia Tsotou) – 3:26

== Personnel ==
- Marinella – vocals
- The Athenians and Tzavara Twins – background vocals on tracks 1, 3, 4, 7, 8 and 11
- Philippos Papatheodorou – producer
- Kostas Klavvas – arranger, conductor
- Yiannis Smyrneos – recording engineer
- Alinta Mavrogeni – photographer
- Antonis Kanavakis – artwork
