= I Marinella Se Tragoudia Tis Vembo =

Studio album by Marinella
- Released: 3 March 1980 (Greece)
- Recorded: Athens, 1980, studio Polysound
- Genre: World music; folk; Éntekhno; waltz; archontorebetiko
- Length: 36:34
- Language: Greek
- Label: PolyGram Greece; Philips
- Producer: Philippos Papatheodorou

Marinella chronology
S' Agapo (1979)	I Marinella Se Tragoudia Tis Vembo (1980)	Portraito (1980)

Marinella studio album chronology
S' Agapo (1979)	I Marinella Se Tragoudia Tis Vembo (1980)	Marinella & Kostas Hatzis – To Tam-Tam (1980)

I Marinella se tragoudia tis Vembo (Greek: Η Μαρινέλλα σε τραγούδια της Βέμπο; English: Marinella in songs of Vembo) is the name of a studio album by Greek singer Marinella. It was released on 3 March 1980 by PolyGram Records in Greece and is a collection of 12 songs Marinella recorded in tribute to popular Greek singer Sofia Vembo, known as the "Songstress of Victory". This album was issued in mono and stereo. The stereo version of this album was released on CD in 1994 by PolyGram.

== Track listing ==
Side one.

1. "Svise to fos" (Σβήσε το φως; Switch off the light) – (Leo Rapitis – Mimis Traiforos) – 3:25
2. "O anthropos mou" (Ο άνθρωπος μου; My man) – (Menelaos Theofanidis – Mimis Traiforos) – 3:28
3. "Na me pernane ta synnefa" (Να με παίρνανε τα σύννεφα; If the clouds could take me) – (Leo Rapitis – Mimis Traiforos) – 3:11
4. "Tha kathomouna plai sou" (Θα καθόμουνα πλάι σου; I would sit near you) – (Michalis Souyioul – Giorgos Giannakopoulos – Alekos Sakellarios) – 2:50
5. "Harami" (Χαράμι; In vain) – (Michalis Souyioul – Mimis Traiforos) – 3:02
6. "Erini" (Ερήνη; Irene) – (Kostas Giannidis – Mimis Traiforos) – 3:22
  - A live version of this song appears on Mia Vradia Me Tin Marinella.

Side two.

1. "I tampakera" (Η ταμπακέρα; The cigarette case) – (Joseph Richiadis – Mimis Traiforos – Giorgos Giannakopoulos) – 3:31
2. "S' agapo ke m' aresi i zoi" (Σ' αγαπώ και μ' αρέσει η ζωή; I love you and I like life) – (Menelaos Theofanidis – Mimis Traiforos) – 2:50
3. "Gia 'sena" (Για 'σένα; For you) – (Vaggelis Lykiardopoulos – Mimis Traiforos) – 3:11
4. "Pare pia to dromo sou" (Πάρε πια το δρόμο σου Go your way now) – (Akis Smyrneos – Mimis Traiforos) – 3:16
5. "Omonia Place" (Ομόνοια Place; Omonoia Square) – (Menelaos Theofanidis – Giorgos Asimakopoulos – Panagiotis Papadoukas) – 3:41
6. "Kapios, kapou, kapote" (Κάποιος, κάπου, κάποτε; Someone, somewhere, sometime) – (Menelaos Theofanidis – Giorgos Giannakopoulos – Mimis Traiforos) – 2:47

== Personnel ==
- Marinella – vocals
- Kostas Klavvas – adaption, arranger, conductor
- Philippos Papatheodorou – producer
- Yiannis Smyrneos – recording engineer
- Alinta Mavrogeni – photographer
