= Alli Mia Fora =

Alli Mia Fora may refer to:

- Alli Mia Fora (Antique album), 2003
- Alli Mia Fora (Marinella album), 1976
- Alli Mia Fora (Popi Maliotaki album), 2006
