= Marina Latorre =

Chilean writer, journalist and gallerist

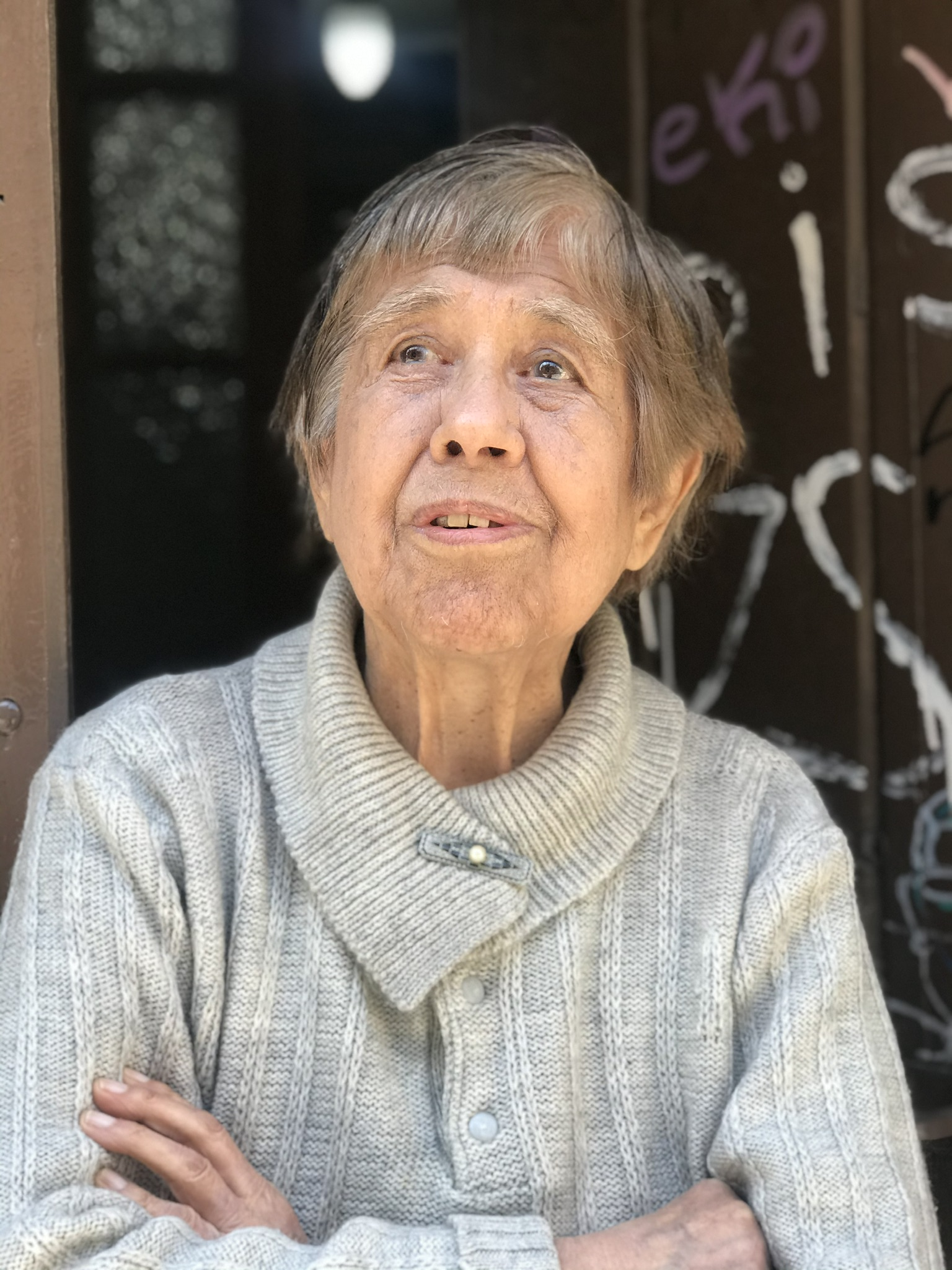
- Marina Latorre in 2020
- Born: Marina Latorre Uribe; 14 August 1925 (age 101); Punta Arenas, Chile
- Education: University of Chile
- Occupations: Poet, writer, journalist and gallerist
- Spouse: Eduardo Bolt
- Writing career
- Genres: Poetry, Novel, Short Story, Essay

Marina Latorre Uribe (born 14 August 1925) is a Chilean writer, journalist and gallerist.

== Life ==
Latorre was born in Punta Arenas, Chile. In the 1940s, she moved to Santiago to pursue a career as a literature teacher at Universidad de Chile. During that same period, she married Eduardo Bolt, with whom she founded the Bolt Art Gallery, at Londres #92, in the heart of the cultural and historic Santiago Neighborhood Barrio París-Londres. In 1965, Latorre founded the Literature magazine "Portal" with Pablo Neruda as a collaborator, including, then inedit, poems such as "Corona del archipiélago para Rubén Azócar" (which triggered Neruda's famous rivalry with Pablo de Rokha), "Corbata para Nicanor Parra" and "Oda al hombre sencillo". Among the writers published in its pages were Yevgeny Yevtushenko, Nicolás Guillén, Jorge Teillier, Francisco Coloane, Roque Esteban Scarpa and Leopoldo Castedo.

At the same time Latorre debuted as a writer herself with the Short Story collection "Galería clausurada" (1964), beginning a writing career that has included fiction, essay, memoires and, mostly, poetry, receiving special attention by important critics and writers of its time, like Hernan del Solar, Andres Sabella and Maria Luisa Bombal.

== Prizes ==
1973: Best Essay Editora Nacional Quimantú for "El incendio de la Federación Obrera de Magallanes", essay about the 1920 Arson attack and fire on the Federación Obrera de Magallanes (award ceremony was suspended due to 1973 Chilean coup d'état. Finally awarded, and published, in 2012).

2022: Premio municipal "Santiago Construye Historia" Municipality of Santiago

2026: Orden al Mérito Artístico y Cultural Pablo Neruda

== Bibliography ==
- Galería clausurada, short stories, 1964.
- Latinoamérica te amo, collection of articles published in La Nación (Chile), 1972.
- Soy una mujer, testimony, 1973.
- El monumento, short story, 1973.
- Antonio Machado a través de Pablo Neruda, Juvencio Valle y Acario Cotapos, essay, 1973.
- El regalo, short story, 1974. (translated to Greek by Neruda's translator Danai Stratigopoulou)
- Fauna austral, poetry, 1977.
- ¿Cuál es el dios que pasa?, novel, Editorial Nascimento, 1978.
- Ventisquero, poetry, 1981.
- Habitante de un mundo mágico, memoires, 1987.
- Mi Poesía Magallánica, poetry, 2011.
- El incendio de la Federación Obrera de Magallanes, essay, 2012.
- Pablo Neruda: poeta. El privilegio de su amistad, memoires, University of Magallanes Ediciones, 2013.
- Desolación de Gabriela Mistral en Magallanes Confín del Mundo, essay, 2014.
- Galería clausurada (reedition, including "Soy una mujer" and "El regalo"), Alberto Hurtado University Ediciones, 2021.
