= Megales Stigmes =

Studio album by Marinella
- Released: 29 August 1984
- Recorded: Athens, studio Polysound, 1984
- Genres: World music; Folk; Éntekhno; Modern Laika
- Language: Greek
- Labels: PolyGram Greece; Philips
- Producer: Philippos Papatheodorou

Marinella chronology
Gia 'Sena Ton Agnosto (1983)	Megales Stigmes (1984)	I Agapi Mas (1985)

Megales stigmes (Greek: Μεγάλες στιγμές; Great times) is the name of a double studio album by Greek singer Marinella. It was released on 29 August 1984 by PolyGram Records in Greece. The original release was in stereo on vinyl, under the label of Philips Records. In 1990, the album was reissued with three fewer tracks ("Den itan nisi", "O Karagkiozis", "O Charos vgike pagania") and new artwork. In the form of the 1990 reissue, the album was released on CD by PolyGram.

== Track listing ==
=== Disc 01 ===
Side One.

1. "Agapi mou (Phaedra)" (Αγάπη μου; My love) – (Mikis Theodorakis – Giannis Theodorakis) – 3:14
2. "Odos oniron" (Οδός ονείρων; Street of dreams) – (Manos Hadjidakis) – 3:15
3. "Omorfi poli" (Όμορφη πόλη; Beautiful city) – (Mikis Theodorakis – Giannis Theodorakis) – 3:49
4. "An thymithis t' oniro mou" (Αν θυμηθείς τ' όνειρό μου; If you remember my dream) – (Mikis Theodorakis – Nikos Gatsos) – 2:30
5. "Kathe trelo pedi" (Κάθε τρελό παιδί; Every crazy child) – (Manos Hadjidakis) – 2:41

Side Two.

1. "Den itan nisi" (Δεν ήταν νησί; It wasn't an island) – (Manos Hadjidakis – Gerasimos Stavrou) – 3:14
2. "Tora pou pas stin xenitia" (Τώρα που πας στην ξενιτιά; Now as you are going abroad) – (Manos Hadjidakis – Nikos Gatsos) – 2:51
3. "O Karagkiozis" (Ο Καραγκιόζης; Karagiozis) – (Dionysis Savvopoulos) – 2:41
4. "Enas mythos" (Ένας μύθος; A tale) – (Manos Hadjidakis – Thrasyvoulos Stavrou) – 3:15
5. "Ta logia ke ta chronia" (Τα λόγια και τα χρόνια; The words and the years) – (Yannis Markopoulos – Manos Eleftheriou) – 4:38

=== Disc 02 ===
Side One.

1. "To palio roloi" (Το παλιό ρολόι; The old clock) – (Manos Loïzos – Lefteris Papadopoulos) – 3:55
2. "Pes pos m' antamoses" (Πες πως μ' αντάμωσες; Say that you met me) – (Giannis Spanos – Lefteris Papadopoulos) – 4:08
3. "Ypomoni" (Υπομονή; Patience) – (Stavros Xarchakos – Alekos Sakellarios) – 2:38
4. "Agapi pou 'gines dikopo macheri" (Αγάπη που 'γινες δίκοπο μαχαίρι; Love that you became a double-edged dagger) – (Manos Hadjidakis – Ioanna Georgakopoulou – Michael Cacoyannis) – 2:45
  - A live version of this song appears on I Marinella Tragouda Ke Thimate.
5. "O kyr' Antonis" (Ο κυρ' Αντώνης; Mister Anthony) – (Manos Hadjidakis) – 2:19
6. "Aspra, kokkina, kitrina, mple" (Άσπρα, κόκκινα, κίτρινα, μπλε; White, red, yellow, blue) – (Dimos Moutsis – Giannis Logothetis) – 2:46

Side Two.

1. "Sta pervolia" (Στα περβόλια; In the gardens) – (Mikis Theodorakis) – 4:45
  - A live version of this song appears on Me Varka To Tragoudi.
2. "Matia vourkomena" (Μάτια βουρκωμένα; Misty eyes) – (Stavros Xarchakos – Nikos Gatsos) – 3:10
3. "O Charos vgike pagania" (Ο Χάρος βγήκε παγανιά; Charos came prowling) – (Dimos Moutsis – Manos Eleftheriou) – 2:42
4. "Afta ta cheria" (Αυτά τα χέρια; These hands) – (Dimos Moutsis – Lefteris Papadopoulos) – 3:14
5. "Etsi in' i zoi" (Έτσι είν' η ζωή; This is how life is) – (Dimos Moutsis – Giannis Logothetis) – 3:05

== Personnel ==
- Marinella – vocals, background vocals
- Philippos Papatheodorou – producer
- Kostas Klavvas – arranger, conductor
- Yiannis Smyrneos – recording engineer
- Giorgos Papachristoforou – assistant recording engineer
- Takis Diamantopoulos – photographer
- Dinos Diamantopoulos – photographer (1990 reissue)
- Petros Paraschis – artwork (1990 reissue)
