= Albania (album) =

Studio album by Marinella
- Released: 9 October 1973
- Recorded: Athens, 1973, studio Polysound
- Genre: World music; Folk; Éntekhno
- Length: 30:17
- Language: Greek
- Label: PolyGram Greece; Philips
- Producer: Philippos Papatheodorou

Marinella chronology
Mia Vradia Me Tin Marinella No. 2 (1973)	Albania (1973)	Marinella Gia Panta (1974)

Albania (Greek: Αλβανία) is the name of a studio album by Greek singer Marinella. It was released on 9 October 1973 by PolyGram Records in Greece with lyrics about the Greco-Italian War of '40. Marinella made her debut performance with a concert in the Municipal Theater of Piraeus, conducted by Giorgos Katsaros, on the eve of Ohi Day, with live streaming by EIRT, on 27 October 1973.

This album was issued in mono and stereo. The stereo version of this album was released on CD in 1994 by PolyGram. In 2007, Universal Music Greece granted a licensed re-release to Athens-based Espresso newspaper for their Chrysi Diskothiki (Golden Record Library), the re-release contained the same tracks as the original album.

== Track listing ==
- All lyrics by Pythagoras; all music by Giorgios Katsaros.

Side one.

1. "Dio pedia ap' to Vrachori" (Δυο παιδιά απ' το Βραχώρι; Two children from Vrachori) – 2:18
2. "I Ipirotisses" (Οι Ηπειρώτισσες; Women of Epirus) – 2:23
3. "O efedros" (Ο έφεδρος; The drafted sub-lieutenant) – 3:37
4. "Mana tha tous perimeni" (Μάνα θα τους περιμένει; A mother will be waiting) – 2:08
5. "Gramma ap' to Metopo" (Γράμμα απ' το Μέτωπο; Letter from the Front) – 3:10
6. "Pirame t' Argyrokastro" (Πήραμε τ' Αργυρόκαστρο; We took Argyrokastro) – 3:03

Side two.

1. "O Napolitanos" (Ο Ναπολιτάνος; The Neapolitan) – 2:38
2. "Enas Thessalos fantaros" (Ένας Θεσσαλός φαντάρος; A soldier from Thessaly) – 2:44
3. "Nihta evlogimeni" (Νύχτα ευλογημένη; Blessed night) – 2:17
4. "I katarrefsi" (Η κατάρρευση; The collapse) – 2:07
5. "I opisthohorisi" (Η οπισθοχώρηση; The retreat) – 2:36
6. "Mana mou kripse to spathi (Krata mana)" (Μάνα μου κρύψε το σπαθί; Mother, hide the sword) – 2:37

== Personnel ==
- Marinella – vocals, background vocals
- Philippos Papatheodorou – producer
- Giorgos Katsaros – arranger, conductor
- Yiannis Smyrneos – recording engineer
- Nikos Petropoulos – artwork
