= Giati Fovase =

Promotional single by Despina Vandi

from the album Despina Vandi Live
- Released: 2004
- Recorded: Studio Sierra
- Length: 2:41
- Label: Heaven Music, Le Ros Music France, Warner Chappell Music Greece
- Songwriters: Stélios Vlavianós, Robert Constandinos, Pythagoras Papastamatiou (lyrics)
- Producer: Giorgos Stampolis

Giati Fovase (Greek: Γιατί φοβάσαι; English: Why do you dread) is a Greek-language song performed by Greek recording artist Despina Vandi from her live album Despina Vandi Live. It was released as a promotional cd-single from the album in 2004. The song was recorded from her sold-out live concert in the Lycabettus theatre in Athens in 2003.

== Original version ==
The song was first released in 1975 by Demis Roussos, titled "From souvenirs to souvenirs" and had international success. Then Marinella sang it with Greek lyrics by Pythagoras, which made it a huge success in Greece. This version was released on her studio album Marinella Gia Panta, on 30 June 1975 by PolyGram Records.

== Track listing ==
No.	Title	Lyrics	Music	Length
1.	"Giati Fovase" (Γιατί φοβάσαι)	Pythagoras Papastamatiou	Stélios Vlavianós, Robert Constandinos	2:41
2.	"Video Giati Fovase (gia PC)" (Video Γιατί φοβάσαι (για PC))	Pythagoras	Stélios Vlavianós, Robert Constandinos	2:42

== Music video ==
A music video was filmed for the song and directed by Kostas Kapetanidis. The video includes footage from the live performance of the song in Lycabettus theatre in Athens in 2003.
