= Marinella & Kostas Hatzis – To Tam-Tam =

To Tam-Tam

Live album by Marinella and Kostas Hatzis
- Released: December, 1980
- Recorded: Athens, 11 November 1980
- Genre: World music; Folk; Éntekhno; Modern Traditional
- Length: 92minutes 98 seconds
- Language: Greek
- Label: PolyGram Greece; Philips
- Producer: Philippos Papatheodorou

Marinella chronology
Portraito (1980)	Marinella & Kostas Hatzis – To Tam-Tam (1980)	Marinella – Gia 'Senane Mporo (1981)

Kostas Hatzis chronology
Portraito (1980)	Marinella & Kostas Hatzis – To Tam-Tam (1980)	Ntaoulierika (1982)

To tam-tam (Greek: Το ταμ – ταμ; English: The tam-tam) is the name of a double live album by popular Greek singers Marinella and Kostas Hatzis. It is their second joint live album, was recorded at the boite "Scorpios" on 11 November 1980. It was released in December 1980 by PolyGram Records in Greece and Cyprus and it went platinum, selling over 100,000 units.

The album is entirely composed Kostas Hatzis, with lyrics by Xenofontas Fileris, Giorgos Economidis, Sotia Tsotou and Ursula Yordi.

This album was issued in mono and stereo. The stereo version of this album was released on a 2-CD set in 1993 with a new cover by PolyGram. In 1997, was re-issued in remastered sound on a 4-CD box set, together with the 1976 album Marinella & Kostas Hatzis – Recital, titled "Marinella & Kostas Hatzis – Resital Gia Dio (Recital for two)", by Universal Music/Mercury. This compilation was re-released in May, 2008 and 2012 in new editions.

== Track listing ==
=== Disc 01 ===
Side One. (Kostas Hatzis)

1. "To tam-tam" (Το ταμ – ταμ; The tam-tam) – (Lyrics by Xenofontas Fileris) – 13:28
2. "Makrini siopi" (Μακρινή σιωπή; Distant silence) – (Lyrics by Xenofontas Fileris) – 2:55
3. "Zitite filos" (Ζητείται φίλος; Requested a friend) – (Lyrics by Xenofontas Fileris) – 2:24
4. "Ime o politis tou planiti pou gerna" (Είμαι ο πολίτης του πλανήτη που γερνά; I am a citizen of the world that is aging) – (Lyrics by Xenofontas Fileris) – 2:09
5. "Afti i gi de mas axizi" (Αυτή η γη δε μας αξίζει; We're not worthy of this earth) – (Lyrics by Xenofontas Fileris) – 1:31
6. "Skinotheto" (Σκηνοθετώ; I am directing) – (Lyrics by Xenofontas Fileris) – 2:00

Side Two. (Marinella, feat. Kostas Hatzis)

1. "Den thelo gramma" (Δεν θέλω γράμμα; I don't want letter) – (Lyrics by Xenofontas Fileris) – 3:55
2. "I palies kales meres" (Οι παλιές καλές μέρες; The good old days) – (Lyrics by Giorgos Economidis) – 2:24
3. "Ton echasa" (Τον έχασα; I lost him) – (Lyrics by Sotia Tsotou) – 2:14
4. "Esy pou xeris" (Εσύ που ξέρεις; You who know) – (Lyrics by Xenofontas Fileris) – 3:30
5. "Ah, pos me kitas" (Αχ, πώς με κοιτάς; Oh, how you look at me) – (Lyrics by Xenofontas Fileris) – 2:27
6. "Mi zitas" (Μη ζητάς; Don't ask) – (Lyrics by Giorgos Ikonomidis) – 2:31
7. "Mes' to iliovasilema" (Μέσ' το ηλιοβασίλεμα; Into the sunset) – (Lyrics by Sotia Tsotou) – 2:57
8. "Giati" (Γιατί; Why?) – (Lyrics by Sotia Tsotou) – 1:30
9. "An tragoudousan ta tragoudia" (Αν τραγουδούσαν τα τραγούδια; If songs could sing) – (Lyrics by Giorgos Ikonomidis) – 3:26

=== Disc 02 ===
Side One. (Kostas Hatzis)

1. "O Souris ke i epochi mas" (Ο Σουρής και η εποχή μας; Souris and our time) – (Lyrics by Xenofontas Fileris) – 6:48
2. "Ta karagkiozilikia" (Τα καραγκιοζιλίκια; The funny actions) – (Lyrics by Xenofontas Fileris) – 4:56
3. "Icha enan patera" (Είχα έναν πατέρα; I had a father) – (Lyrics by Giorgos Ikonomidis) – 4:30
4. "Pes tin alithia adelphe tragoudisti" (Πες την αλήθεια αδελφέ τραγουδιστή; Tell the truth, my brother-singer) – (Lyrics by Xenofontas Fileris) – 3:30
5. "To yiftaki" (Το γυφτάκι; The gipsy kid) – (Lyrics by Xenofontas Fileris) – 4:45

Side Two. (Marinella & Kostas Hatzis)

1. "Pare ena kochili ap' to Aegeo" (Πάρε ένα κοχύλι απ' το Αιγαίο; Get a sea-shell from Aegean Sea) – (Lyrics by Xenofontas Fileris) – 3:05
2. "O Giannis" (Ο Γιάννης; Yannis) – (Lyrics by Giorgos Ikonomidis) – 3:03
3. "Isotita" (Ισότητα; Equality) – (Lyrics by Xenofontas Fileris) – 2:18
4. "Pios to perimene" (Ποιος το περίμενε; Who waited it) – (Lyrics by Ursula Yordi) – 2:40
5. "Echo mia chirovomvida" (Έχω μια χειροβομβίδα; I have a grenade) – (Lyrics by Ursula Yordi) – 2:24
6. "Mia chameni Kyriaki" (Μια χαμένη Κυριακή; Some lost Sunday) – (Lyrics by Xenofontas Fileris) – 2:47
7. "Ntiri manam' ntiri" (Ντίρι μάναμ' ντίρι; Diri, diri, my mother) – (Lyrics by Xenofontas Fileris) – 3:15
8. "O Yiorikas ki o Kostikas" (Ο Γιωρίκας κι ο Κωστίκας; Yorikas and Costikas, the Pontic Greeks) – (Lyrics by Xenofontas Fileris) – 2:51
9. "O laos mas" (Ο λαός μας; Our people) – (Lyrics by Xenofontas Fileris) – 2:45

== Personnel ==
- Marinella – vocals, background vocals
- Kostas Hatzis – vocals, background vocals
- Philippos Papatheodorou – producer
- Kostas Klavvas – arranger, conductor
- Yiannis Smyrneos – recording engineer
- Alinta Mavrogeni – photographer
