= S' Agapo =

Studio album by Marinella
- Released: 10 August 1979 (Greece)
- Recorded: Athens, 1979, studio Polysound
- Genre: World music; folk; pop
- Length: 33:58
- Language: Greek
- Label: PolyGram Greece; Philips
- Producer: Philippos Papatheodorou

Marinella chronology
I Marinella Tou Simera (1978)	S' Agapo (1979)	I Marinella Se Tragoudia Tis Vembo (1980)

S' Agapo (Greek: Σ' αγαπώ, lit. 'I love you') is the name of a studio album by Greek singer Marinella. It was released on 10 August 1979 by PolyGram Records in Greece and it went gold selling over 50,000 units. This album was issued in mono and stereo. The stereo version of this album was released on CD with a new cover in April 1994 by PolyGram.

== Track listing ==
Side one.

1. "Kalytera" (Καλύτερα; For the best) – (Nikos Ignatiadis) – 3:08
2. "Na 'me" (Να 'μαι; There I am) – (Thanasis Polykandriotis – Yiannis Parios) – 2:50
3. "Pote na mi hathis ap' ti zoi mou" (Ποτέ να μη χαθείς απ' τη ζωή μου; You never get out of my life) – (Nikos Ignatiadis – Manos Koufianakis) – 3:16
4. "I agapi mas giorti (Hello, hello)" (Η αγάπη μας γιορτή; Our love is a celebration) – (Richard Palmer-James – Piero Trombetta – Yiannis Parios) – 2:51
5. "Etsi apla s' agapao" (Έτσι απλά σ' αγαπάω; That simply I love you) – (Giorgos Katsaros – Yiannis Parios) – 2:40
6. "Proti mou fora" (Πρώτη μου φορά; My first time) – (Nini Zaha) – 3:10

Side two.

1. "S' agapo" (Σ' αγαπώ; I love you) in duet with Tolis Voskopoulos – (Philippos Papatheodorou as Giannis Axiotis – Nasos Nanopoulos) – 3:12
2. "Thelo na ziso" (Θέλω να ζήσω; I want to live) – (Nini Zaha) – 3:20
3. "Ti ki an perasan chronia" (Τι κι αν περάσαν χρόνια; What if years have gone by) – (Nikos Ignatiadis – Yiannis Parios) – 2:37
4. "Perimeno mono esena" (Περιμένω μόνο εσένα; I'm waiting just for you) – (Giorgos Katsaros – Sofi Zanninou) – 2:54
5. "Ke mou milas gia monaxia" (Και μου μιλάς για μοναξιά; And you speak to me of loneliness) – (Giorgos Katsaros – Yiannis Parios) – 3:19
6. "1001 nichtes" (1001 νύχτες; 1001 nights) – (Nikos Tzavaras – Mimis Theiopoulos) – 2:51

== Personnel ==
- Marinella – vocals, background vocals
- Tolis Voskopoulos – vocals
- Tzavara Twins – background vocals on track 10
- Philippos Papatheodorou – producer
- Kostas Klavvas – arranger and conductor on tracks 2, 4, 6, 7, 8 and 12
- Nikos Ignatiadis – arranger and conductor on tracks 1, 3 and 9
- Giorgos Katsaros – arranger and conductor on tracks 5, 10 and 11
- Yiannis Smyrneos – recording engineer
- Alinta Mavrogeni – photographer
