= Gia 'Sena Ton Agnosto =

Studio album by Marinella
- Released: September 27, 1983 (Greece)
- Recorded: Athens, studio Polysound, 1983
- Genre: World music; folk; modern Laika
- Length: 31:17
- Language: Greek
- Label: PolyGram Greece; Philips
- Producer: Philippos Papatheodorou

Marinella chronology
| 15 Chronia Marinella (1982) | Gia 'Sena Ton Agnosto (1983) | Megales Stigmes (1984) |

Marinella studio album chronology
| Marinella – Gia 'Senane Mporo (1981) | 'Gia 'Sena Ton Agnosto (1983) | Megales Stigmes (1984) |

Gia 'sena ton agnosto (Greek: Για 'σένα τον άγνωστο; For you, the unknown) is the name of a studio album by Greek singer Marinella. It was released on September 27, 1983, by PolyGram Records in Greece and it went gold selling over 50,000 units. The album is entirely composed by Giorgos Hatzinasios, with lyrics by Michalis Bourboulis. The original release was in stereo on vinyl and cassette, under the label of Philips Records. In 1996, the album was released on CD by PolyGram, under the label of Mercury Records.

== Track listing ==
Side one.

1. "Eise potami" (Είσαι ποτάμι; You are a river) – 3:34
2. "Mi me rotas" (Μη με ρωτάς; Don't ask me) – 3:20
3. "Echo psychi" (Έχω ψυχή; I have a soul) – 2:32
4. "Kamia fora" (Καμιά φορά; Sometimes) – 3:16
5. "Mesimeraki" (Μεσημεράκι; Little noon) – 2:36
6. "Ta simata" (Τα σήματα; The signals) – 1:51

Side two.

1. "O agnostos (Gia 'sena ton agnosto)" (Ο άγνωστος; The unknown) – 2:44
2. "Erotas anatolitis" (Έρωτας ανατολίτης; Love oriental) – 3:32
3. "Stin odo Kallidromiou" (Στην οδό Καλλιδρομίου; At Kallidromiou street) – 2:46
4. "Enas anthropos zestos" (Ένας άνθρωπος ζεστός; A warm man) – 3:08
5. "Forages ton ilio" (Φόραγες τον ήλιο; You wore the sunshine) – 2:47
6. "Ta simata (Instrumental)" (Τα σήματα; The signals) – 1:51

== Personnel ==
- Marinella – vocals, background vocals
- Philippos Papatheodorou – producer
- Giorgos Hatzinasios – arranger, conductor
- Yiannis Smyrneos – recording engineer
- Dinos Diamantopoulos – photographer
- Petros Paraschis – artwork
