= I Marinella Tou Simera =

Studio album by Marinella
- Released: 5 April 1978 (Greece)
- Recorded: Athens, 1978, studio Polysound
- Genre: World music; folk; modern Laika
- Length: 30:07
- Language: Greek
- Label: PolyGram Greece; Philips
- Producer: Philippos Papatheodorou

Marinella chronology
Marinella & Athenians (1977)	I Marinella Tou Simera (1978)	S' Agapo (1979)

I Marinella tou simera… Se tragoudia tou Giorgou Hatzinasiou (Greek: Η Μαρινέλλα του σήμερα… Σε τραγούδια του Γιώργου Χατζηνάσιου; Marinella of today… In George Hadjinasios songs) is the name of a studio album by Greek singer Marinella. It was released on 5 April 1978 by PolyGram Records in Greece and it went platinum, selling over 100,000 units.

The album is entirely composed by Giorgos Hatzinasios, with lyrics by Michalis Bourboulis, Manos Eleftheriou, Manos Koufianakis, Nikos Vrettos, Sofia Papadopoulou and Mimis Theiopoulos. The original release was in stereo on vinyl and cassette. This album was re-issued on CD in January 1993 by PolyGram.

== Track listing ==
Side One

1. "Na pezi to tranzistor" (Να παίζει το τρανζίστορ; The transistor radio plays) – (Lyrics by Michalis Bourboulis) – 2:47
2. "Echis liga chronia, echis" (Έχεις λίγα χρόνια, έχεις; You only have a few years left) – (Lyrics by Michalis Bourboulis) – 3:11
3. "Pedi ap' tin Anavysso" (Παιδί απ' την Ανάβυσσο; The boy from Anavyssos) – (Lyrics by Michalis Bourboulis) – 2:33
4. "Stin Eftychia Papagianopoulou" (Στην Ευτυχία Παπαγιαννοπούλου; Dedicated to Eftychia Papagianopoulou) – (Lyrics by Manos Eleftheriou) – 3:06
5. "Egin' o kosmos kafenes" (Έγιν' ο κόσμος καφενές; The world became a coffee shop) – (Lyrics by Manos Eleftheriou) – 2:22
6. "I treli" (Οι τρελοί; The crazy ones) – (Lyrics by Manos Eleftheriou) – 2:17

Side Two

1. "Den ine pou fevgis" (Δεν είναι που φεύγεις; It isn't you're leaving) – (Lyrics by Michalis Koufianakis) – 2:49
2. "Simera" – (Σήμερα; Today) – (Lyrics by Mimis Theiopoulos) – 3:02
3. "Tak, tik tak" (Τακ, τικ τακ; Tack, tick tack) – (Lyrics by Sofia Papadopoulou) – 3:12
4. "S' efcharisto" (Σ' ευχαριστώ; I thank you) – (Lyrics by Sofia Papadopoulou) – 3:27
5. "Den fteme emis" (Δεν φταίμε εμείς; It's not our fault) – (Lyrics by Nikos Vrettos) – 3:44

== Personnel ==
- Marinella – vocals, background vocals
- Philippos Papatheodorou – producer
- Giorgos Hatzinasios – arranger, conductor
- Yiannis Smyrneos – recording engineer
- Alinta Mavrogeni – photographer
