= Marinella & Tolis Voskopoulos – Ego Ki' Esy =

Ego Ki' Esy

Studio album by Marinella & Tolis Voskopoulos
- Released: 12 November 1974
- Recorded: Athens, 1974, studio Polysound
- Genre: World music; folk; Modern Laika
- Length: 35:34
- Language: Greek
- Label: PolyGram Greece; Philips
- Producer: Philippos Papatheodorou

Marinella chronology
Marinella & Voskopoulos (1974)	Marinella & Tolis Voskopoulos – Ego Ki' Esy (1974)	Ta Oraiotera Tragoudia Mou (1974)

Tolis Voskopoulos chronology
Marinella & Voskopoulos (1974)	Marinella & Tolis Voskopoulos – Ego Ki' Esy (1974)	Ego Ti Eho Ke Ti Tha 'Ho (1975)

Ego ki' esy (Greek: Εγώ κι' εσύ; You and I) is a studio album by Greek singers Marinella and Tolis Voskopoulos. It was released on 12 November 1974 by PolyGram Records in Greece. This album was issued in mono and stereo. The stereo version of this album was released on CD in 1992 by PolyGram.

== Track listing ==
Side one.

1. "Ego ki esy (Ta logia ine peritta)" (Εγώ κι εσύ; You and I) – (Tolis Voskopoulos – Mimis Theiopoulos) – 3:24
2. "Pou pane – pou pane" (Πού πάνε – πού πάνε; Where they're going?) – (Giorgos Katsaros – Pythagoras) – 2:56
3. "Ine arga gia klamata" (Είναι αργά για κλάματα; It's too late to cry) – (Stelios Zafeiriou – Pythagoras) – 3:34
4. "Kerna – kerna" (Κέρνα – κέρνα; Βought them drinks) – (Stelios Zafeiriou – Pythagoras) – 2:51
5. "Patision ke Stournara" (Πατησίων και Στουρνάρα; Patision and Stournari streets) – (Giorgos Katsaros-Pythagoras) – 2:51
6. "Ti zitame" (Τι ζητάμε; What we ask?) – (Tolis Voskopoulos – Mimis Theiopoulos) – 3:34

Side two.

1. "Pires ti zoi mou" (Πήρες τη ζωή μου; You took my life) – (Giorgos Katsaros – Pythagoras) – 2:26
2. "Oute enas" (Ούτε ένας; Not even one) – (Stelios Zafeiriou – Pythagoras) – 2:51
3. "Dose mou Thee mou" (Δώσε μου Θεέ μου; Give me, my God) – (Stelios Zafeiriou – Pythagoras) – 3:06
4. "O telefteos mou stathmos" (Ο τελευταίος μου σταθμός; My last station) – (Giorgos Katsaros – Ilias Lymperopoulos) – 3:14
5. "Synnefiazi Margarita" (Συννεφιάζει Μαργαρίτα; Margaret, it's cloudy) – (Giorgos Katsaros – Pythagoras) – 3:05
6. "Ainte mpros" (Άιντε μπρος; Come on, go forward) – (Stelios Zafeiriou – Pythagoras) – 2:42

== Personnel ==
- Marinella – vocals, background vocals
- Tolis Voskopoulos – vocals, background vocals
- Philippos Papatheodorou – producer
- Yiannis Smyrneos – recording engineer
- Alinta Mavrogeni – photographer
