= Marinella (1981 album) =

Marinella (Gia 'Senane Boro)

Studio album by Marinella
- Released: 28 September 1981 (Greece)
- Recorded: Athens, 1981, studio Polysound
- Genre: World music; folk; modern Laika
- Length: 42:51
- Language: Greek
- Label: PolyGram Greece; Philips
- Producer: Philippos Papatheodorou

Marinella chronology
Marinella & Kostas Hatzis – To Tam-Tam (1980)	Marinella (Gia 'Senane Boro) (1981)	15 Chronia Marinella (1982)

Marinella studio album chronology
Marinella & Kostas Hatzis – To Tam-Tam (1980)	Marinella – Gia 'Senane Boro (1981)	Gia 'Sena Ton Agnosto (1983)

Marinella – Gia 'senane boro (Greek: Μαρινέλλα – Για 'σένανε μπορώ; Marinella – For you, I can) is the name of a studio album by Greek singer Marinella. It was released on 28 September 1981 by PolyGram Records in Greece and it went gold selling over 50,000 units. The original release was in stereo on vinyl and cassette. This album was re-issued on CD in 1994 by PolyGram.

== Track listing ==
Side one.

1. "Argi na ximerosi" (Αργεί να ξημερώσει; The dawn takes long) – (Antonis Stefanidis – Sotia Tsotou) – 3:09
2. "Kardoula mou de se malono" (Καρδούλα μου δε σε μαλώνω; My sweetheart, I don't scold you) – (Antonis Stefanidis – Sotia Tsotou) – 3:34
3. "Ta mesanichta" (Τα μεσάνυχτα; The midnight) – (Antonis Stefanidis – Sotia Tsotou) – 2:34
4. "Xegelo ton kathena" (Ξεγελώ τον καθένα; I fool everybody) – (Antonis Stefanidis – Sasa Manetta) – 3:38
5. "Ego tha paro kapetanio" (Εγώ θα πάρω καπετάνιο; I'll marry a captain) – (Antonis Stefanidis – Sotia Tsotou) – 2:37
6. "Min argis (Moi j'ai mal)" (Μην αργείς; Don't be late) – (Serge Lama – Antonis Stefanidis – Dimitris Iatropoulos) – 4:19

Side two.

1. "Isos na poneso" (Ίσως να πονέσω; I might hurt) – (Antonis Stefanidis – Dimitris Iatropoulos) – 2:27
2. "Mipos ine erotas" (Μήπως είναι έρωτας; Maybe it's love) – (Spyros Papavasileiou – Tasos Economou) – 3:26
3. "Kalinichta" (Καληνύχτα; Good night) – (Giorgos Krimizakis – Panos Falaras) – 2:34
4. "Gia 'senane boro" (Για 'σένανε μπορώ; For you, I can) – (Antonis Stefanidis – Sotia Tsotou) – 2:43
5. "Ageras isoun" (Αγέρας ήσουν; You were wind) – (Antonis Stefanidis – Manos Koufianakis) – 3:33
6. "Mesimeri ke vrady" (Μεσημέρι και βράδυ; Noon and evening) – (Antonis Stefanidis – Sotia Tsotou) – 3:31
7. "Vrechi" (Βρέχει; It's raining) – (Antonis Stefanidis – Sotia Tsotou) – 3:43

== Personnel ==
- Marinella – vocals, background vocals
- Christoforos – background vocals on "Kardoula mou de se malono"
- Philippos Papatheodorou – producer
- Kostas Klavvas – arranger, conductor
- Yiannis Smyrneos – recording engineer
- Alinta Mavrogeni – photographer
