= I Agapi Mas =

Studio album by Marinella
- Released: 26 February 1985 (Greece)
- Recorded: Athens, studio Polysound, studio All Sound
- Genre: World music; folk; blues; modern Laika
- Length: 43:02
- Language: Greek
- Label: PolyGram Greece; Philips
- Producer: Philippos Papatheodorou

Marinella chronology
Megales Stigmes (1984)	I Agapi Mas (1985)	Mia Nihta (1986)

I agapi mas (Greek: Η αγάπη μας; Our love) is a studio album by Greek singer Marinella. It was released on 26 February 1985 by PolyGram Records in Greece and it went gold selling over 50,000 units. The original release was in stereo on vinyl and cassette, under the label of Philips Records. In 1991, the album was re-issued with new artwork and in 1993 was released on CD with two bonus tracks by PolyGram Records.

== Track listing ==
Side one.

1. "I agapi mas" (Η αγάπη μας; Our love) feat. Manolis Lidakis – (Spyros Papavasileiou – Nikos Vrettos) – 2:53
2. "An s' agapousa pio ligo" (Αν σ' αγαπούσα πιο λίγο; If I loved you less) – (Spyros Papavasileiou – Nikos Vrettos) – 3:47
3. "Dichos agapi" (Δίχως αγάπη; Without love) – (Alekos Chrysovergis – Spyros Giatras) – 3:27
4. "Mpori" (Μπορεί; It's possible) – (Alekos Chrysovergis – Spyros Giatras) – 2:59
5. "As' tous anthropous na fonazoune “Zito"" (Ασ' τους ανθρώπους να φωνάζουνε «Ζήτω»; Let people shout “Hooray") – (Spyros Papavasileiou – Nikos Vrettos) – 3:02
6. "Opos akrivos anaseno" (Όπως ακριβώς ανασαίνω; Just like I breathe) – (Spyros Papavasileiou – Nikos Vrettos) – 3:00
7. "Echo tin pio orea agapi" (Έχω την πιο ωραία αγάπη; I have got the nicest love) – (Marios Tokas – Sarantis Alivizatos) – 3:57

Side two.

1. "Eise pantou ke pouthena" (Είσαι παντού και πουθενά; You are everywhere and nowhere) in duet with Kostas Hatzis – (Alexis Papadimitriou – Argiro Sofou) – 5:18
2. "Ke psachno na se vro" (Και ψάχνω να σε βρω; And I'm looking to find you) – (Alekos Chrysovergis – Spyros Giatras) – 3:45
3. "Otan les “S' agapo"" (Όταν λες «Σ' αγαπώ»; When you say “I love you") – (Marios Tokas – Sarantis Alivizatos) – 3:31
4. "Den ginete" (Δεν γίνεται; It can't happen) – (Alekos Chrysovergis – Spyros Giatras) – 3:24
5. "Mine konta mou" (Μείνε κοντά μου; Stay close to me) – (Alekos Chrysovergis – Spyros Giatras) – 3:12
6. "Stamatisame" (Σταματήσαμε; We stopped) – (Alekos Chrysovergis – Spyros Giatras) – 3:27

Bonus track on the CD re-issue.

1. "Pseftiki apantisi enos apogevmatos" (Ψεύτικη απάντηση ενός απογεύματος; False answer of an afternoon) – (Takis Mpougas – Kostas Tripolitis as Kostas Allos) – 4:09
  - This song had been recorded in 1987 and released on Ring.
2. "Tilefono" (Τηλεφωνώ; I call) – (Takis Mpougas – Kostas Tripolitis as Kostas Allos) – 5:13
  - This song had been recorded in 1987 and released on Ring.

== Personnel ==
- Marinella – vocals, background vocals
- Kostas Hatzis – vocals
- Manolis Lidakis – background vocals on "I agapi mas"
- Philippos Papatheodorou – producer
- Spyros Papavasileiou – arranger and conductor on tracks 1, 2, 5 and 6
- Alekos Chrysovergis – arranger and conductor on tracks 3, 4, 9, 11, 12 and 13
- Haris Andreadis – arranger and conductor on tracks 7, 8, and 10
- Yiannis Smyrneos – recording engineer
- Dinos Diamantopoulos – photographer
