= Danai Stratigopoulou =

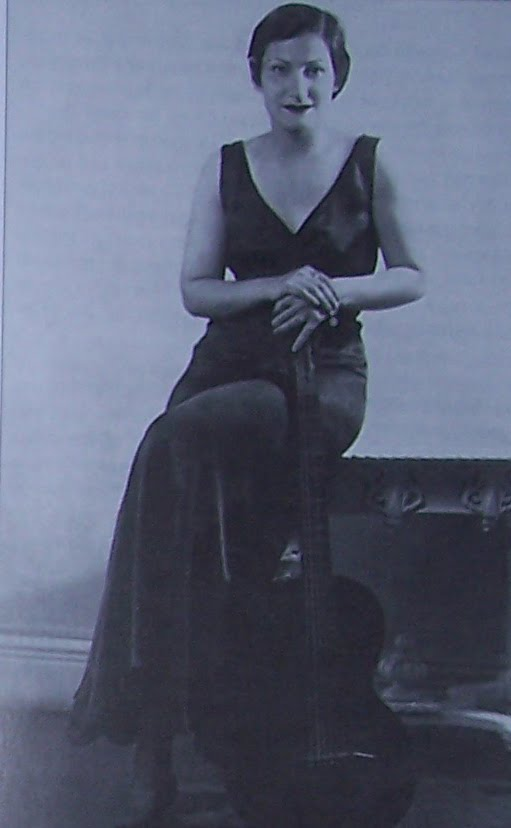

Background information
- Born: 8 February 1913 Athens, Greece
- Died: 18 January 2009 (aged 95) Athens, Greece
- Genres: Opera, Greek folk music
- Occupation(s): University academic, singer, author, composer

Danai Stratigopoulou (Greek: Δανάη Στρατηγοπούλου; 8 February 1913 – 18 January 2009) was a Greek singer, writer, and university academic. She acquired recognition in the literary world for translating the works of the Chilean nobel laureate Pablo Neruda into the Greek language.

== Early life ==
Danai was born in Athens but grew up in Paris and Marseille, France where she studied political science, orthophony and phonetics, whilst she developed her career as a singer. In the early years of her career as a musician she collaborated with a number of Greek musicians. In 1935 she interprets the songs of the modern music composer Attik (Kleon Triandafylou) and subsequently recorded and popularised many of his songs.

Throughout her career as a musician, she devoted herself to interpreting Greek folk and popular songs. She earned awards and decorations for her singing and compositions at national and international music festivals and during the Second World War she fought in the anti-Nazi and anti-fascist resistance.

== Residence in Chile ==
In Chile, Stratigopoulou held an academic post at the University of Santiago de Chile as an educator in Greek folklore and phonetics. It was during her residence in Chile that she composed much of her musical work (which totalled about 300 songs), and published a number of literary works and poetry.

Stratigopoulou formed a personal friendship with the Chilean poet and Nobel laureate Pablo Neruda and would spend time at Neruda's residence in Isla Negra where she read and discussed poetry. Her vast knowledge of Neruda's work and literature and language led her to become an important translator of Pablo Neruda's Spanish poetry into Greek. For all her cultural work in Chile, she was decorated by the Chilean Republic.

== Bibliography ==
- Singing (Chronicle) (1950)
- Backlash (Poetry) (1954)
- Reactions (Poetry) (1960)
- The Heights of Machu Picchu by Pablo Neruda – (Greek Translation, 1966)
- For a Pair of Wheels – A Study into Folklore (1972)
- Greek Heroines in Folk Songs – A Study (1973)
- Extravagario by Pablo Neruda (Greek Translation)
- Twenty Love Poems and a Song of Despair by Pablo Neruda (Greek Translation)
- Splendor and death of Joaquin Murieta by Pablo Neruda (Greek Translation)
- Canto General by Pablo Neruda (Greek Translation)
- El regalo by Marina Latorre (Greek Translation)
- Saturday Night

== Discography ==
- Istros – Danai canta a Neruda (1972)
- San Ki Apopse
- Concierto de Chile
- Sta Pio Omorfa Tragoudia Tou Attik (1994)
- San Ki Apopse (2007)
- Skliri Kardia (2010)
- Danai canta a Neruda (2010) – CD Remastered Edition
