= Synantisi =

Studio album by Marinella & Kostas Hatzis
- Released: 29 July 1987 (Greece)
- Recorded: Athens, 1987, studio Polysound
- Genre: World music; folk; Éntekhno
- Length: 33:32
- Language: Greek
- Label: PolyGram Greece; Philips
- Producer: Philippos Papatheodorou

Marinella chronology
14 Apo Ta Oraiotera Tragoudia Mou (1987)	Synantisi (1987)	Tolmo (1988)

Kostas Hatzis chronology
O Kostas Hatzis Zontana Ston Orfea (1984)	Synantisi (1987)	89 (1989)

Synantisi (Greek: Συνάντηση; Encounter) is the name of a studio album by Greek singers Marinella and Kostas Hatzis. The album is entirely composed by Kostas Hatzis and it was released on 29 July 1987 by PolyGram Records in Greece. This album was issued in mono and stereo. The stereo version of this album was released on CD in 2001 by Mercury – Universal Music Greece.

== Track listing ==
Side one.

1. "Tora zo" (Τώρα ζω; Now I live) – (Lyrics by Giannis Tzouanopoulos) – 4:11
2. "Ithaki" (Ιθάκη; Ithaca) – (Lyrics by Sotia Tsotou) – 3:00
3. "Ta “S' agapo" sou ena soro" (Τα “Σ' αγαπώ" σου ένα σωρό; A pile of your "I love you") – (Lyrics by Sotia Tsotou) – 3:21
4. "Tipota" (Τίποτα; Nothing) – (Lyrics by Dimos Valsamis) – 2:55
5. "Doksa to Theo kala pername" (Δόξα τω Θεώ καλά περνάμε; Thank God, we have a good time) – (Lyrics by Sotia Tsotou) – 2:40
6. "Itan archi" (Ήταν αρχή; It was the beginning) – (Lyrics by Xenofontas Fileris) – 1:52

Side two.

1. "Na 'tan o kosmos mia kalpi" (Να 'ταν ο κόσμος μια κάλπη; If the world was a ballot box) – (Lyrics by Sotia Tsotou) – 3:05
2. "Pote den ipa charopo tragoudi" (Ποτέ δεν είπα χαρωπό τραγούδι; I never sang a cheerful song) – (Lyrics by Kostas Hatzis) – 3:05
3. "Tima ti mana mou" (Τίμα τη μάνα μου; Honor my mother) – (Lyrics by Sotia Tsotou) – 2:56
4. "O kalyteros mou filos" (Ο καλύτερος μου φίλος; My best friend) – (Lyrics by Sotia Tsotou) – 2:50
5. "Mas kopsan to fos" (Μας κόψαν το φως; They cut off our light) – (Lyrics by Sotia Tsotou) – 2:43
6. "An" (Αν; If) – (Lyrics by Thanasis Reppas) – 2:54

== Personnel ==
- Marinella – vocals, background vocals
- Kostas Hatzis – vocals, background vocals
- Haris Andreadis – arranger, conductor
- Philippos Papatheodorou – producer
- Yiannis Smyrneos – recording engineer
- Dinos Diamantopoulos – photographer
- Petros Paraschis – artwork
