= Marinella & Kostas Hatzis – Recital =

Recital

Live album by Marinella and Kostas Hatzis
- Released: April 1976
- Recorded: Athens, 28 March 1976
- Genres: World music; Folk; Éntekhno
- Language: Greek
- Labels: PolyGram Greece; Philips
- Producer: Philippos Papatheodorou

Marinella chronology
Marinella Gia Panta (1975)	Marinella & Kostas Hatzis – Recital (1976)	Portreta (1976)

Kostas Hatzis chronology
Anthropina Systimata (1976)	Marinella & Kostas Hatzis – Recital (1976)	Elpida – Dakis Stou Kosta Hatzi (1977)

Resital (Greek: Ρεσιτάλ; Recital) is the name of a triple live album by Greek singers Marinella and Kostas Hatzis. It is their first joint live album, was recorded at the boite "Scorpios" on 28 March 1976. It was released in April 1976 by PolyGram Records in Greece and Cyprus and it went platinum, selling over 500,000 units.

The album is entirely composed by Kostas Hatzis, with lyrics by Sotia Tsotou, Dimitris Christodoulou, Ilias Lymperopoulos, Manos Koufianakis, Giannis Pavlou, Danai Stratigopoulou (as Argiro Kalliga), Tonis Chirbinos and Ursula Yordi.

This album was issued in mono and stereo. The stereo version of this album was released on a 2-CD set in 1987 by PolyGram. In 1997, was re-issued in remastered sound on a 4-CD box set, together with the 1980 album Marinella & Kostas Hatzis – To Tam-Tam, titled "Marinella & Kostas Hatzis – Resital Gia Dio (Recital for two)", by Universal Music/Mercury. This compilation was re-released in May 2008 and 2012 in new editions.

== Track listing ==
=== Disc 01 ===
Side One. (Kostas Hatzis)

1. "Thimame" – (Lyrics by Manos Koufianakis) – (Greek: Θυμάμαι; I remember)
2. "Yiro skotadi" – (Lyrics by Manos Koufianakis) – (Greek: Γύρω σκοτάδι; All around is dark)
3. "Sto cinema" – (Lyrics by Sotia Tsotou) – (Greek: Στο σινεμά; At the movies)
4. "Den im' ego" – (Lyrics by Sotia Tsotou) – (Greek: Δεν είμ' εγώ; It isn't me)
5. "Dipla s' agapisa" – (Lyrics by Manos Koufianakis) – (Greek: Διπλά σ' αγάπησα; I loved you doubly)
6. "Den ithela na dino" – (Lyrics by Manos Koufianakis) – (Greek: Δεν ήθελα να δίνω; I didn't want to give)
7. "Anthropos ise" – (Lyrics by Manos Koufianakis) – (Greek: Άνθρωπος είσαι; You are only human)
8. "Spoudei anthropi, alla" – (Lyrics by Sotia Tsotou) – (Greek: Σπουδαίοι άνθρωποι, αλλά; Great people, but)
9. "I gi gia 'mena ine spiti" – (Lyrics by Sotia Tsotou) – (Greek: Η γη για 'μένα είναι σπίτι; Earth is my home)
10. "Sinithismeni istoria" – (Lyrics by Sotia Tsotou) – (Greek: Συνηθισμένη ιστορία; A usual story)
11. "Kato ap' to synnefo" – (Lyrics by Dimitris Christodoulou) – (Greek: Κάτω απ' το σύννεφο; Under the cloud)
12. "Akouse ypne mou" – (Lyrics by Dimitris Christodoulou) – (Greek: Άκου ύπνε μου; Listen, my sleep)
13. "Pikri keri" – (Lyrics by Ilias Lymperopoulos) – (Greek: Πικροί καιροί; Bitter times)
14. "Itan gia olous adelfos" – (Lyrics by Giannis Logothetis) – (Greek: Ήταν για όλους αδελφός; He was a brother to all)
15. "Esy pou irthes" – (Lyrics by Ursula Yordi) – (Greek: Εσύ που ήρθες; You came)
16. "Amin" – (Lyrics by Sotia Tsotou) – (Greek: Αμήν; Amen)
17. "Thelo na po ena tragoudi" – (Lyrics by Sotia Tsotou) – (Greek: Θέλω να πω ένα τραγούδι; I want to say a song)

Side Two. (Marinella, feat. Kostas Hatzis)

1. "Nekro mou oniro" – (Lyrics by Giannis Pavlou) – (Greek: Νεκρό μου όνειρο; My dead dream)
2. "Olo o kosmos is' esy" – (Lyrics by Sotia Tsotou) – (Greek: Όλος ο κόσμος είσ' εσύ; You're the whole world)
3. "S' agapo" – (Lyrics by Sotia Tsotou) – (Greek: Σ' αγαπώ; I love you)
4. "S' aparnithika tris" – (Lyrics by Sotia Tsotou) – (Greek: Σ' απαρνήθηκα τρις; I renounced you thrice)
5. "Ki' ystera" – (Lyrics by Sotia Tsotou) – (Greek: Κι' ύστερα; And afterwards)
6. "Tora pou stegnosan ta dakria mou" – (Lyrics by Ilias Lymperopoulos) – (Greek: Τώρα που στέγνωσαν τα δάκρυα μου; Now that my tears have dried)
7. "Synora i agapi den gnorizi" – (Lyrics by Sotia Tsotou) – (Greek: Σύνορα η αγάπη δεν γνωρίζει; Love knows no frontier)
8. "Otan to fos tis agapis tha svisi" – (Lyrics by Sotia Tsotou) – (Greek: Όταν το φως της αγάπης θα σβήσει; When the light of love will turn off)
9. "Glyko tis niotis mou pouli" – (Lyrics by Sotia Tsotou) – (Greek: Γλυκό της νιότης μου πουλί; Sweet bird of my youth)
10. "Pare me mazi sou tsiggane" – (Lyrics by Sotia Tsotou) – (Greek: Πάρε με μαζί σου τσιγγάνε; Gypsy man, take me with you)
11. "I agapi ola ta ypomeni" – (Lyrics by Sotia Tsotou) – (Greek: Η αγάπη όλα τα υπομένει; Love withstands all)

=== Disc 02 ===
Side One. (Marinella)

1. "O yelastos mou adelfos" – (Lyrics by Ilias Lymperopoulos) – (Greek: Ο γελαστός μου αδελφός; My laughing brother)
2. "An ise antras me kardia" – (Lyrics by Ursula Yordi) – (Greek: Αν είναι άντρας με καρδιά; If you are a man with a heart)
3. "Poso pikrameni ein' i matia mou" – (Lyrics by Ursula Yordi) – (Greek: Πόσο πικραμένη είν' η ματιά μου; How bitter my look is)
4. "Leventonios" – (Lyrics by Ilias Lymperopoulos) – (Greek: Λεβεντονιός; Laddie)
5. "Ke mi rotisis pia" – (Lyrics by Sotia Tsotou) – (Greek: Και μη ρωτήσεις πια; Ask no more)
6. "I teleftea selida" – (Lyrics by Sotia Tsotou) – (Greek: Η τελευταία σελίδα; The last page)

Side Two. (Kostas Hatzis)

1. "Kapia mera skeftomouna" – (Lyrics by Danai Stratigopoulou as Argiro Kalliga) – (Greek: Κάποια μέρα σκεφτόμουνα; I was thinking someday)
2. "Monologoume" – (Lyrics by Sotia Tsotou) – (Greek: Μονολογούμε; We're monologuing)
3. "Agapo – agapo" – (Lyrics by Sotia Tsotou) – (Greek: Αγαπώ – αγαπώ; I love – I love)
4. "Oli i zoi ine ypothesis hamogelo" – (Lyrics by Sotia Tsotou) – (Greek: Όλη η ζωή είναι υπόθεσις χαμόγελο; The whole life is a question of smile)
5. "I palia Edem" – (Lyrics by Sotia Tsotou) – (Greek: Η παλιά Εδέμ; Old Eden)
6. "Deka entoles" – (Lyrics by Sotia Tsotou) – (Greek: Δέκα εντολές; Ten commandments)

=== Disc 03 ===
Side One. (Kostas Hatzis, Marinella)

1. "I synidisi" – (Lyrics by Ilias Lymperopoulos) – (Greek: Η συνείδηση; The conscience)
2. "Kalovoli etouti i vradia" – (Lyrics by Manos Koufianakis) – (Greek: Καλόβολη ετούτη η βραδιά; A night with good intentions)
3. "Zitite" – (Lyrics by Manos Koufianakis) – (Greek: Ζητείται; Requested)
4. "Pos na fygis" – (Lyrics by Ilias Lymperopoulos) – (Greek: Πώς να φύγεις; How can you leave)
5. "Dakry sto dakry to pikro" – (Lyrics by Tonis Chirbinos) – (Greek: Δάκρυ στο δάκρυ το πικρό; Tears, with bitter tears)

Side Two. (Marinella, Kostas Hatzis)

1. "In' karavia ta kormia mas" – (Lyrics by Giannis Pavlou) – (Greek: Είν' καράβια τα κορμιά μας; Our bodies are ships)
2. "Me les tragoudisti" – (Lyrics by Giannis Pavlou) – (Greek: Με λες τραγουδιστή; You call me a singer)
3. "Xechasa na po" – (Lyrics by Danai Stratigopoulou as Argiro Kalliga) – (Greek: Ξέχασα να πω; I forgot to say)
4. "Fovame" – (Lyrics by Danai Stratigopoulou as Argiro Kalliga) – (Greek: Φοβάμαι; I am afraid)
5. "Trelos i pallikari" – (Lyrics by Sotia Tsotou) – (Greek: Τρελός ή παλικάρι; A madman or a lad)

== Personnel ==
- Marinella – vocals, background vocals
- Kostas Hatzis – vocals, background vocals
- Philippos Papatheodorou – producer
- Kostas Hatzis – arranger and conductor on discs 1 and 2 (Side one)
- Kostas Klavvas – arranger and conductor on discs 2 (Side two) and 3
- Yiannis Smyrneos – recording engineer
- Alinta Mavrogeni – photographer
- Εliot Landy – photographer
