= Giorgos Hatzinasios =

Greek songwriter and composer (born 1942)

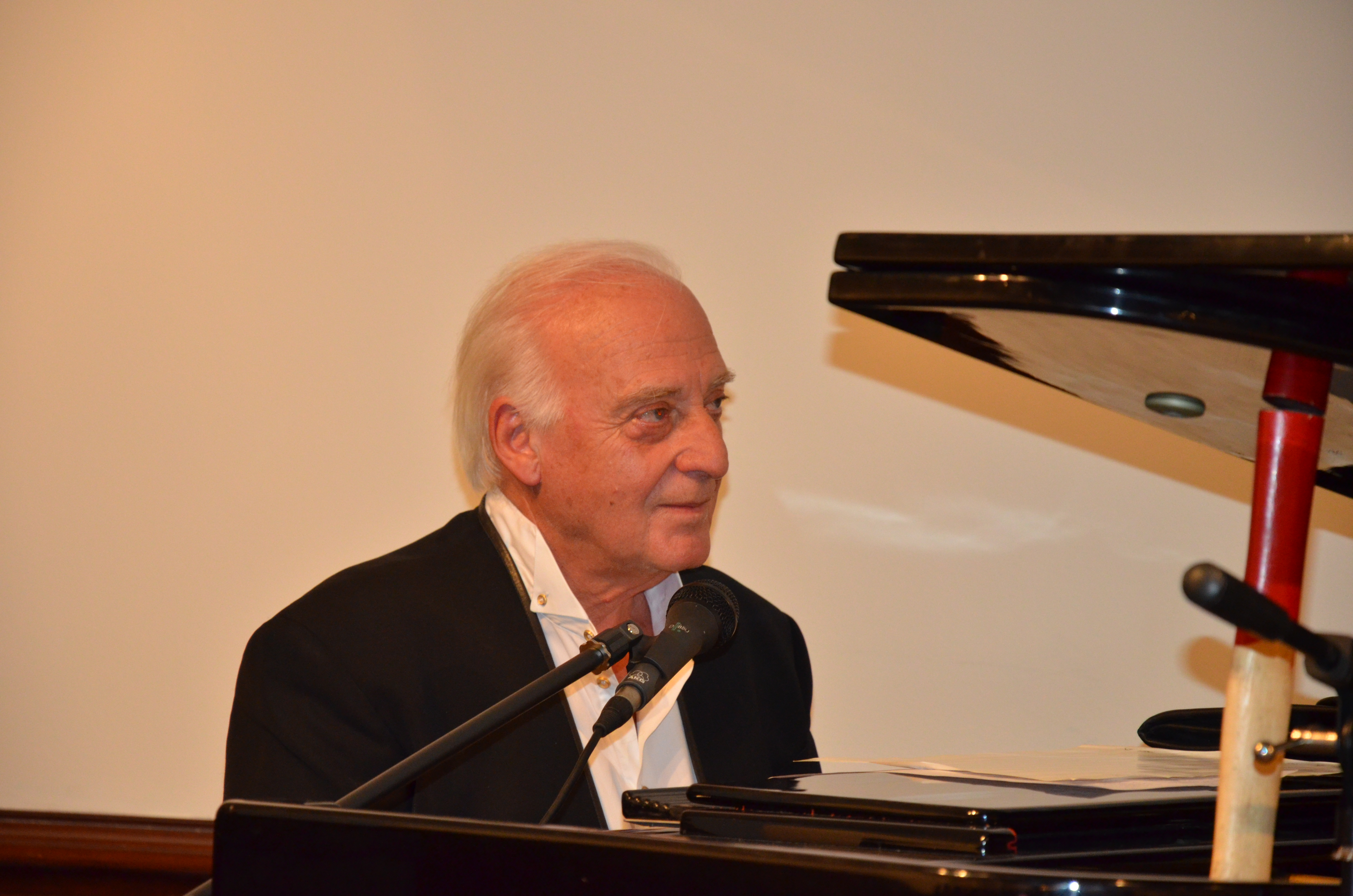
- Hatzinasios giving a concert in Istanbul in 2012
- Born: 19 January 1942 (age 84); Thessaloniki, Greece
- Occupations: Songwriter; composer
- Years active: 1972–present
- Spouse: Maria
- Children: 3
- Musical career
- Genre: Entekhno
- Instrument: Piano
- Website: www.hatzinasios.gr

Giorgos Hatzinasios (also spelled Hadjinasios; Greek: Γιώργος Χατζηνάσιος, pronounced [ˈʝoɾɣos xadziˈnasios]; born 19 January 1942) is a Greek songwriter and composer.

== Early life ==
Hatzinasios was born in Thessaloniki. His father was Agapios Hatzinasios, a native of Nigrita, Serres and a music professor of Thessaloniki's State Conservatory and a renowned saxophonist. His mother was Anna Zografou, a native of Galatista in Chalkidiki.

His paternal grandfather, also Georgios Hatzinasios and a graduate from the Phanar Greek Orthodox College, was a merchant and visited the Holy Land at a young age with his father, Athanassios. This is the source of the surname ('Χατζής' - Hajj and Αθανάσιος - Athanasios combined).

His maternal grandfather, Themistoklis Zografos, was a hagiographer from Mount Athos.

Giorgos Hatzinasios began piano lessons at the age of six at the Macedonian Conservatoire and later moved on to the State Conservatory of Thessaloniki and then the Athens Conservatoire. He later studied in Paris where he studied composition, orchestration and conducting.

== Career ==
By the age of fourteen, he had already achieved notability as a pianist, with a particular interest in jazz and Greek music. Since 1972, he has achieved much recognition in Greece and abroad and his more than forty albums, some amongst which have received gold and platinum status. He has worked with many famous singers including Nana Mouskouri, Marinella and Manolis Mitsias.

He has also written scores for 38 films and 25 theatrical plays.

Hatzinasios wrote the music for and conducted Greece's entry, "Mathima solfege", in the Eurovision Song Contest 1977. The song was performed by Pascalis, Marianna, Robert & Bessy and finished fifth on the night.

He won an award in the 1980 Rose d'Or with the song 'Όταν γύρω Νυχτώνει' ('When Night Falls Around').

=== As a pianist ===
As a piano soloist, Hatzinasios has given recitals both in Greece and abroad in such prestigious venues as Carnegie Hall, the Konzerthaus in Vienna, the White House at Gilwell Park in London and others.

=== Classical pieces ===
Hatzinasios gave the world premiere of his Byzantine-themed oratorio Χρονικόν της Αλώσεως ('Chronicle of the Fall'). For this premiere, he conducted the Orchestra of the Sofia Opera, the Macedonia Chorus with Grigoris Valtinos in a leading role. It was performed in the National Theatre of Northern Greece. The oratorio was performed again at Mystras in 2007 with the Greek Radio Symphony Orchestra and Chorus participating.

In 2005, the first performance of his cantata Ωδή στον Μέγα Αλέξανδρο ('Ode to Alexander the Great') took place at the Athens Concert Hall. The lead performers were Grigoris Valtinos once again and Petros Gaitanos. Another performance took place at the Giza pyramid complex.

== Personal life ==
Hatzinasios is married to Maria, whom he first met when he was 21 and she was 15. They have three children. Their daughter Anna is a promoter of Greek artists abroad. Their second daughter Margarita lives in Geneva with her family. Their son Christos initially worked as a singer. He was a candidate for Greece's entry in the Eurovision Song Contest 2010 with the song "Illusion". He now works in shipping and lives in Monaco.

Hatzinasios is a member of Hellenic Authors’ Society, Intellectual Property Corporation and Greek Research and Technology Network in Greece, PRS for Music in the UK and of SACEM in France.

== Selected discography ==
Albums
Year	Greek Title	Transliteration	Translation
1972	4,5,3		
1973	Έχει ο Θεός	Echei o Theos	God has
1973	Διαδρομή	Diadromi	Course
1974	Άσπρο Μαύρο	Aspro Mavro	Black White
1975	Αντιθέσεις	Antitheseis	Contrasts
1976	Λεύκωμα	Lefkoma	Album
1977	Μάθημα Σολφέζ	Mathima solfege	Solfège Lesson
1978	Θα Σου Χρωστώ	Tha Sou Chrosto	I'll Owe You
1978	Η Μαρινέλλα Του Σήμερα	I Marinella Tou Simera	The Marinella of Today
1978	Ένας Έλληνας Σήμερα	Enas Ellinas Simera	A Greek Today
1979	Εικόνες	Eikones	Pictures
1980	Χωρίς Ταυτότητα	Choris Taftotita	Without Identity
1981	Τα Συναξάρια	Ta Synaxaria	The Hagiographies
1983	Για Σένα Τον Άγνωστο	Gia Sena Ton Agnosto	For You The Unknown
1985	Η Ενδεκάτη Εντολή	I Endekati Entoli	The Eleventh Commandment
1986	Παιχνίδι Για Δύο	Paichnidi Gia Dyo	Game For Two
1988	Μικρές Επαναστάσεις	Mikres Epanastaseis	Small Revolutions
1991	Επίθεση Αγάπης	Epithesi Agapis	Attack of Love
1994	Κεκλεισμένων Των Θυρών	Kekleismenon Ton Thyron	Behind Closed Doors
1997	Άγγιγμα Ψυχής	Angigma Psychis	Touch of Soul
