= Pythagoras Papastamatiou =

Greek lyricist and playwright

- Πυθαγόρας Παπασταματίου
- Born: 12 April 1930; Agrinio, Greece
- Died: 12 November 1979 (aged 49); Athens, Greece
- Education: Athens Conservatoire
- Occupations: Lyricist, playwright

Pythagoras Papastamatiou (Greek: Πυθαγόρας Παπασταματίου; 12 April 1930 – 12 November 1979), mainly known by the mononym Pythagoras, was a Greek lyricist and playwright.

== Biography ==
He was born in 1930 in Agrinio where he lived until he became 18 years old. His family was descended from Samos. His parents met each other in Smyrna (now İzmir, Turkey), shortly before the Asia Minor Catastrophe. The Asia Minor Catastrophe influenced his work later in his life (in 1972, he co-wrote the song Mikra Asia (Μικρά Ασία "Asia Minor") along with Apostolos Kaldaras).

In 1940 (during the outbreak of World War II), Pythagoras started attending high school at Agrinio All-male High school. During the German occupation of Greece, he was hiding in Valtos. In 1944, he joined ELAS. He graduated from high school after the end of the war.

In 1945, he moved to Athens. He attended the Drama School of the Athens Conservatory, where he was a student of Dimitris Rontiris. He later worked for sometime in theatre, and later, in 1958, he became a playwright. In 1973, he became an irregular member of the Greek Playwrights Club. In 1974, he became an associate member and, in 1975, a regular member of that club.

He had been using the mononym "Pythagoras" since his high school years.

He died of a heart attack on 12 November 1979 in Athens.

== Discography ==
- Xanavlepo to mikro to amaxaki (Ξαναβλέπω το μικρό το αμαξάκι), Mary Lo, 1954
- Kathe limani ke kaimos (Κάθε λιμάνι και καημός), Panos Gavalas - Ria Kourti, 1964
- O Stamoulis o lochias (Ο Σταμούλης ο λοχίας)
- Otan pini mia gyneka (Όταν πίνει μια γυναίκα)
- Piso apo tis kalamies (Πίσω από τις καλαμιές), Marinella, 1966
- Kyra-Giorgaina (Κυρά-Γιώργαινα)
- Sta vrachia tis Piraïkis (Στα βράχια της Πειραϊκής), Stelios Kazantzidis - Marinella, 1968
- Nychta stasou (Νύχτα στάσου)
- O epipoleos (Ο επιπόλαιος)
- Albania (Αλβανία), Marinella, 1973
- Krasi, Thalassa Ke T' Agori Mou (Κρασί, θάλασσα και τ' αγόρι μου), Marinella, 1974
