= Sotia Tsotou =

Greek lyricist and journalist

Sotia Tsotou (Greek: Σώτια Τσώτου; 14 May 1942 – 10 December 2011) was a Greek lyricist and journalist.

Tsotou was born on 14 May 1942 in Livadeia, a city in central Greece, and she grew up in Athens. As the only child of wealthy family she studied in Greek-French School of "Saint Joseph" in Attiki. From the age of 18 she started to work as a journalist while she was studying in Panteion University and Drama Schools of Pelos katselis and Kostis Michailidis. During the occupation she had been arrested many times that inspired her to write lyrics for many songs. She died of cancer on 10 December 2011.

== Selected discography ==
- Fotografies, music: Giorgos Krimizakis (1971)
- An Imoun Plousios, music: Doros Georgiadis (1972)
- Diskoli Zoi, music: Doros Georgiadis (1973)
- Chilia Enniakosia Tipota, music: Doros Georgiadis (1974)
- Aspro – Mavro, music: Giorgos Hadjinasios (1974)
- Skorpia Fylla, music: Apostolos Kaldaras (1975)
- Recital, music: Kostas Hatzis (1976)
- Gia 'Senane Mporo, music: Antonis Stefanidis (1981)
- Ego Zografisa Ti Gi, music: Doros Georgiadis (1983)
- Simera Ke Panta, music: Spyros Vlassopoulos (1984)
- Ta Kalytera Mou Chronia, music: Giorgos Krimizakis (1985)
- Synantisi, music: Kostas Hatzis (1987)
- Vradiazei, music: Christos Nikolopoulos (1992)
- Ke Pou Theos, music: Takis Soukas (1994)
