= Kostas Hatzis =

Kostas Hatzis Κώστας Χατζής
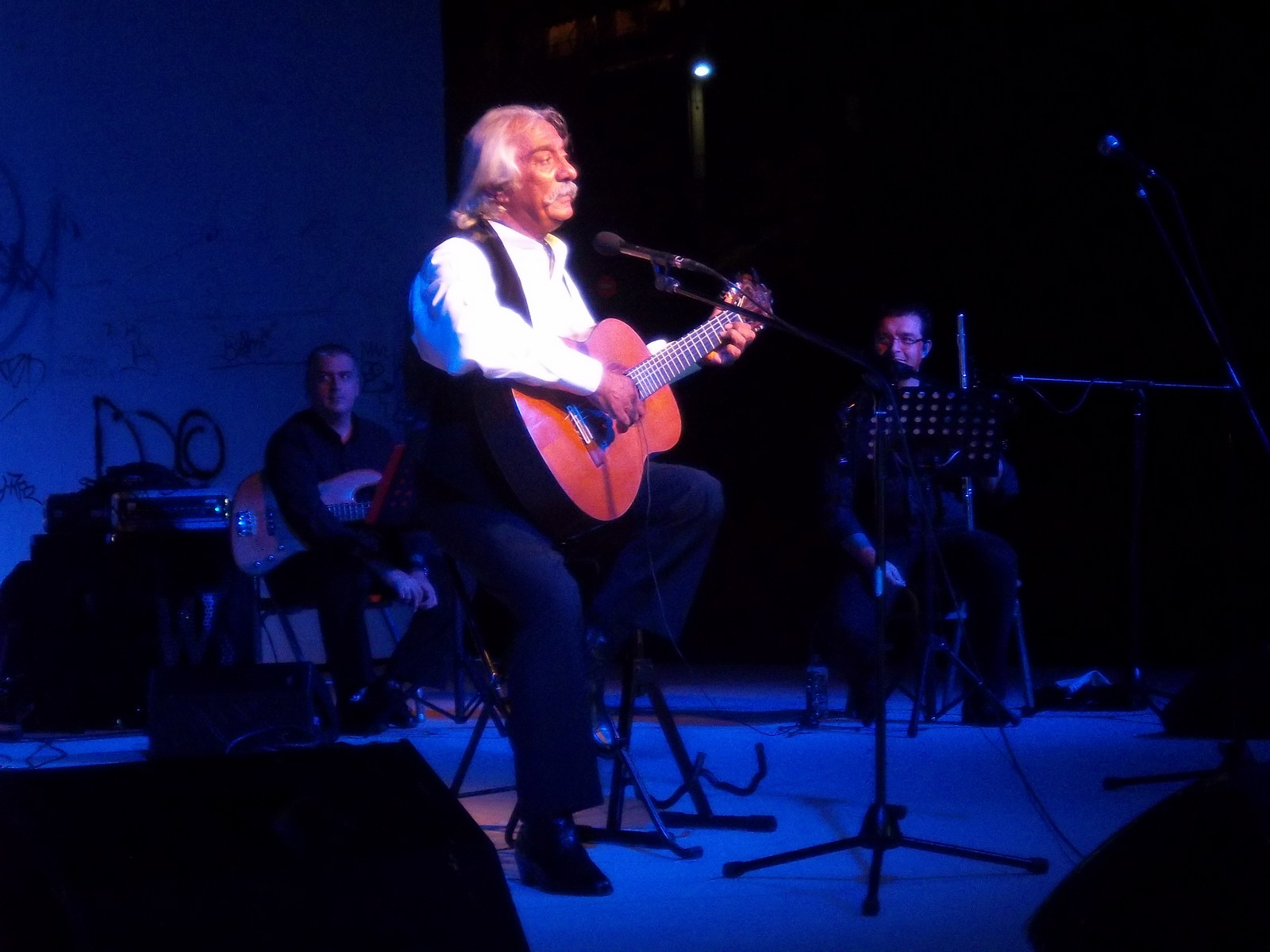

Background information
- Born: Kostas Hatzis; 13 August 1936 (age 90); Livadeia, Kingdom of Greece
- Genres: Folk, Greek New Wave, Éntekhno
- Occupations: Musician, singer, songwriter
- Years active: 1961–present

Kostas Hatzis (also Chatzis or Khadzis; Greek: Κώστας Χατζής, IPA: [ˈkos̠tas̠ xaˈdz̠is̠]; born 13 August 1936) is a Greco-Romani singer-songwriter.

Hatzis was born on 13 August 1936 in the city of Livadeia to a Romani family. Considered a leading composer and a pioneer in the Greek social song, he has popularised the "voice-guitar" style, voicing ballads with social messages.

His grandfather was a popular clarinetist and dulcimer player. Hatzis quickly followed in his grandfather's footsteps. When he was sixteen years old, his father took him to play at weddings, christenings and other events where folk music was requested. After a five-year musical tour of the Greek countryside, he moved to Athens in 1957, began recording in 1961, and became popular in the mid-1960s with the Greek New Wave movement in music.

Hatzis's talent was discovered by the day's great composers like Mikis Theodorakis, Manos Hadjidakis, Mimis Plessas, Stavros Xarchakos, and Yannis Markopoulos, with whom he since has collaborated, performing their songs, incorporating his personal style and particular sensibility to them.

At the end of the 1960s, Hatzis toured the United States to perform concerts for expatriate Greeks. His fame as a singer for peace reached the White House when then-US President Jimmy Carter invited him to meet and be congratulated for his peace work.

Hatzis has sung about love as well as about social issues in duets with singers like Marinella. Hatzis married a German woman, with whom he has a daughter, Daniella, and a son, Alexandros. Both are also singers.

== Discography ==
- 1964: Yannis Markopoulos – To Koritsi Me To Kordelaki (Collaboration)
- 1966: O Kostas Hatzis Tragouda Miki Theodoraki
- 1966: O Kostas Hatzis Pezi Ke Tragouda Mazi Sas
- 1966: O Kostas Hatzis Tragouda Theodoraki, Hadjidaki, Markopoulo
- 1968: Kostas Hatzis – Anagennisis Alonnisos
- 1969: Kostas Hatzis – Stis Gitonies Tou Kosmou
- 1970: O Kostas Hatzis Tragouda Kosta Hatzi
- 1971: Ena Karavi Gemato Tragoudia (Collaboration)
- 1972: Mia vradia Stou Kosta Hatzi
- 1972: Kostas Hatzis – Petra Ke Fos
- 1973: Kostas Hatzis – Ouai
- 1975: Kostas Hatzis – Dekatria Tragoudia
- 1975: Kostas Hatzis – O Yios Tis Anixis
- 1976: Kostas Hatzis – Anthropina Systimata
- 1976: Marinella & Kostas Hatzis - Recital
- 1977: Elpida – Dakis Stou Kosta Hatzi
- 1979: 18 Chronia Kostas Hatzis – Thymithite Mazi Mou (Compilation)
- 1980: Kostas Hatzis – Portraito (Compilation)
- 1980: Marinella & Kostas Hatzis - To Tam-Tam
- 1982: Kostas Hatzis – Ntaoulierika
- 1983: Kostas Hatzis – Ta Stigmata Tou Kerou
- 1984: O Kostas Hatzis Zontana Ston Orfea
- 1985: Marinella – I Agapi Mas (Collaboration)
- 1987: Marinella & Kostas Hatzis - Synantisi
- 1989: Kostas Hatzis – '89
- 1990: Kostas Hatzis – Se 4/4
- 1990: Kostas Hatzis – Mousiki Ierosylia
- 1990: Kostas Hatzis – Rom Agapi Mou
- 1991: I Alexiou Tragoudaei Hatzi
- 1991: Kostas Hatzis – Ora Miden (4 Tragoudia Gia Tin Eirini)
- 1994: O Alexandros Tragouda Kosta Hatzi
- 1995: 30 Chronia Kostas Hatzis Vol. I & II
- 1995: Kostas Hatzis – Tragoudia Gia Filous
- 1995: Kostas Hatzis – Ta Prota mou Tragoudia
- 1996: Kostas Hatzis – Ikones Tou Simera
- 1996: Kostas Hatzis – Mia Vradia Ston Topo Pou Gennithika
- 1997: Marinella & Kostas Hatzis – Resital Gia Dio (Compilation)
- 1998: Kostas Hatzis – Ta Vradia Pou Onirevonte I Tsiggani
- 2000: Kostas Hatzis – Choris Esena
- 2000: Kostas Hatzis – Stigmes Monaxias
- 2002: Mimis Plessas – Iobilaion (Collaboration)
- 2004: Antonis Remos – Live (Collaboration)
- 2005: Kostas Hatzis – Live 1965 – 1979 (Compilation)
- 2007: Kostas Hatzis – Megales Epitihies (Compilation)
- 2007: 45 Chronia Kostas Hatzis – Anthologia 1961 – 2006 (Compilation)
- 2008: Kostas Hatzis
- 2009: Kostas Hatzis & Julie Massino & Alexandros Hatzis – Antitheseis
