= Giorgos Katsaros =

Greek musician and songwriter

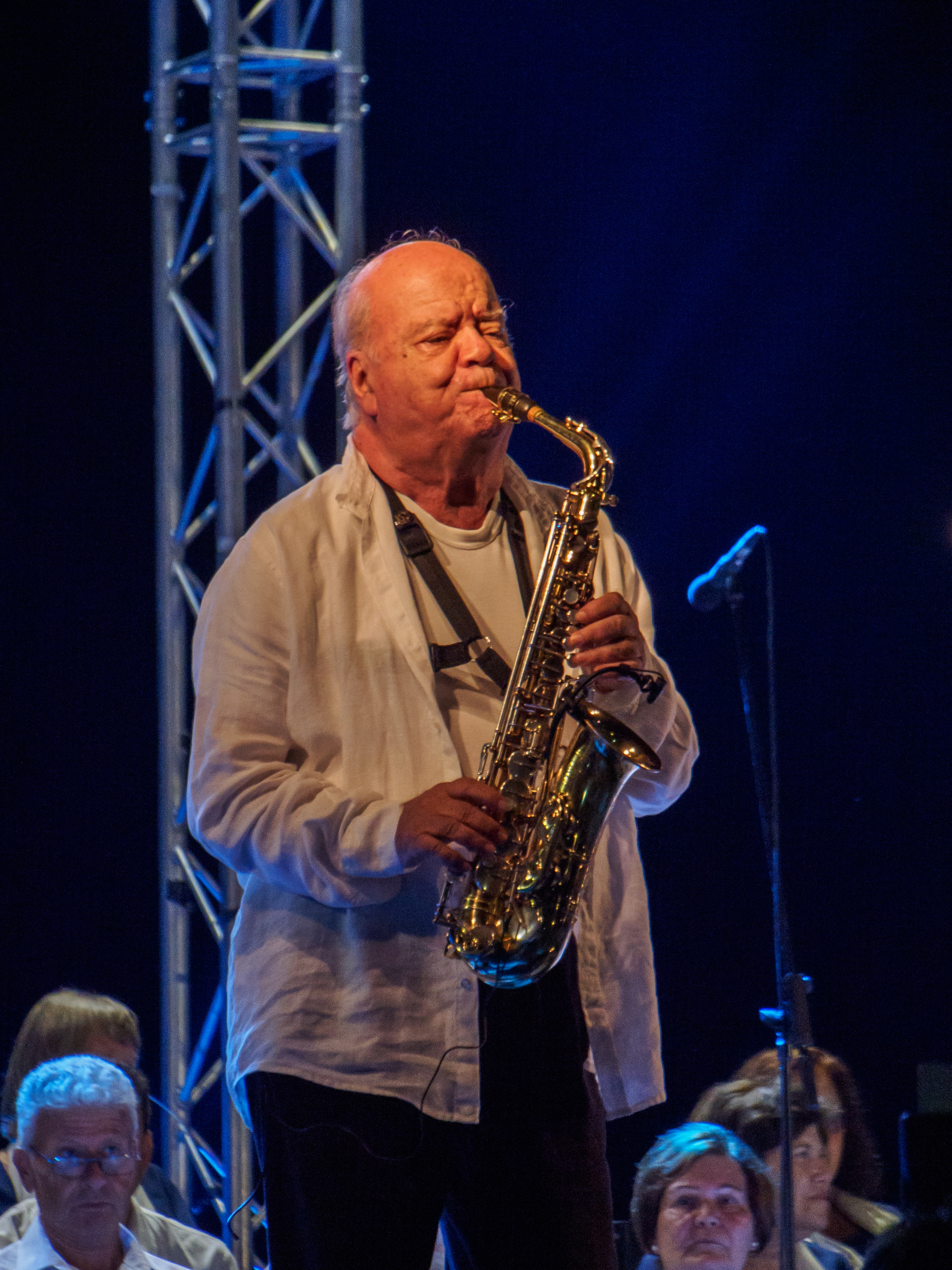
- Giorgos Katsaros at a concert in 2019

Background information
- Born: 7 March 1934 (age 91); Corfu, Greece
- Occupation(s): Musician, composer, arranger
- Instrument: Alto saxophone
- Years active: 1959–present

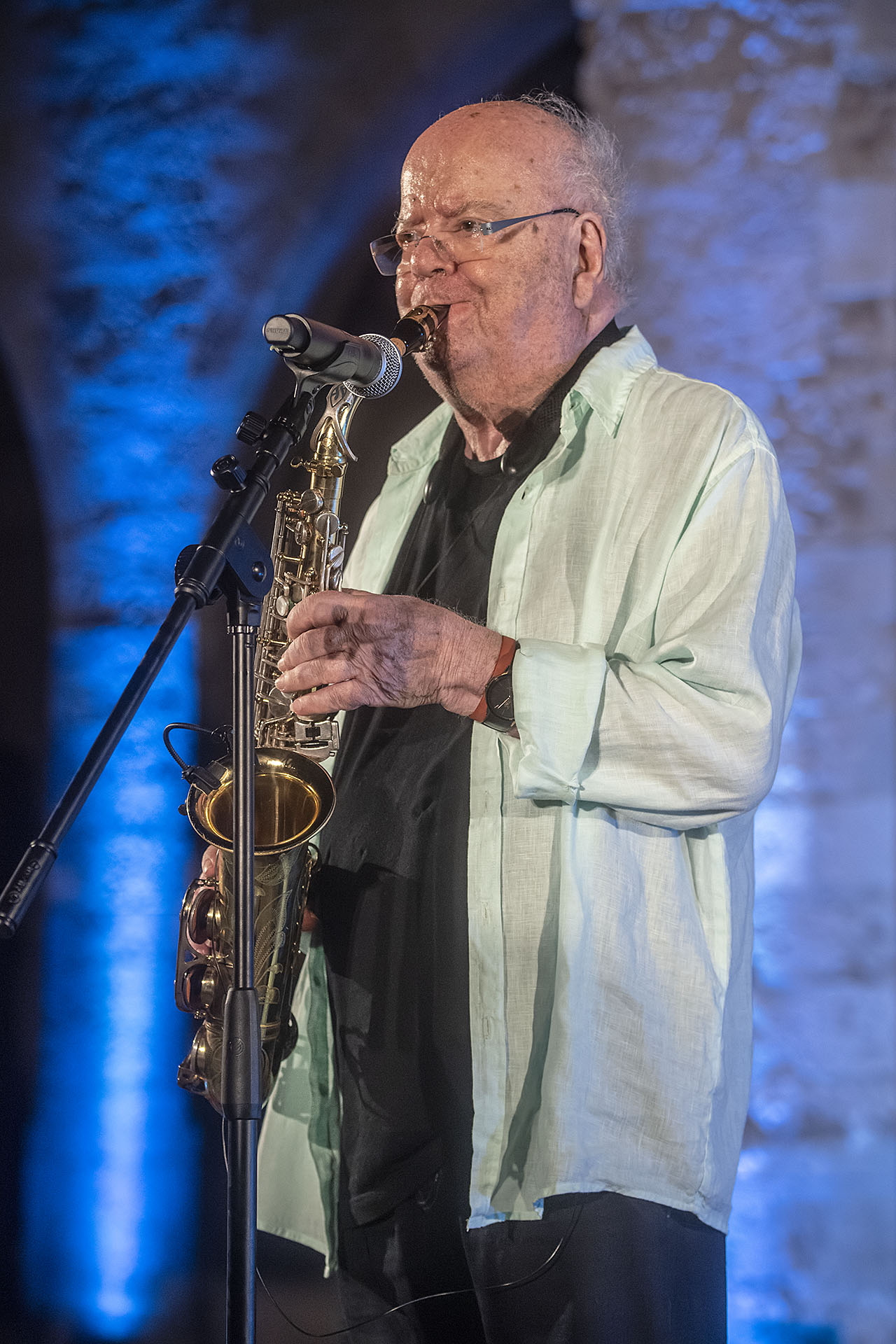
Giorgos Katsoros performs at the Grand Master's Palace in the Rhodes Medieval City in Rhodes, Greece on July 17th, 2024

Giorgos Katsaros (Greek: Γιώργος Κατσαρός; born 7 March 1934) is a Greek musician and songwriter. He plays the alto saxophone. He has made a variety of recordings, collaborating amongst others with Greek musical composers and singers, such as Yannis Theodoridis, Nana Mouskouri, and Mimis Plessas.

In 1972, he wrote the music for Alekos Sakellarios' I Komissa tis Kerkyras (Greek: Η κόμησσα της Κέρκυρας The Countess of Corfu).

He is currently the art director of the Municipal Symphonic Orchestra of Athens.

He has served as a Board Member for Panathinaikos, the team he is a supporter of.
