= Mimis Theiopoulos =

Greek actor and lyricist (1927–2010)

- Μίμης Θειόπουλος
- Born: Dimitrios Theiopoulos; 12 April 1927; Athens, Greece
- Died: 8 April 2010 (aged 82); Alexandras Avenue, Athens, Greece
- Resting place: Zografos Cemetery
- Citizenship: Greece
- Occupations: Actor; lyricist; screenwriter
- Years active: 1954–2003
- Employer: Finos Film

Dimitrios Theiopoulos (Greek: Δημήτριος Θειόπουλος; 12 April 1927 – 8 April 2010) was a Greek actor, lyricist, and screenwriter. Traditionally a character actor, he is mostly known from his work in Greek straight to video cinema; however, he has numerous appearances both in Greek television and stage and he has contributed to scripts of various comedies. A lesser known fact about him is his status as a lyricist of many immensely popular "laika" Greek songs, including collaborations with Tolis Voskopoulos, Christos Nikolopoulos, Yiorgos Chatzinasios and others. While retired, he recently appeared in the international film production of A Touch of Spice (Politiki Kouzina).

Theiopoulos died after being run over by a motorcycle on Alexandras Avenue on 8 April 2010, at age 82. He was buried at Zografos Cemetery.

== Selected filmography ==
=== Actor ===
- as O Theios (in Greek: a spoonerism on the actor's surname; an English translation would be "the Uncle", a crime lord), in the 1989 direct to video actioner Cops supply the Dope (Batsoi poulan tin Iroini), by the legendary film making duo of Alexandros Diamantis & Dimitris Tzelas, starring Kostas Karagiorgis. He revisited that role in the sequel, aptly titled, Cops supply the dope, part II (Batsoi poulan tin Iroini, no. 2), starring Steve Douzos.
- as a senior police officer investigating a bizarre series of murders in Athens, in the 1989 thriller the Strangler of Syggrou avenue (O Strangalistis tis Syggrou), a thriller starring Apostolos Souglakos. A remake of William Lustig's Maniac, this film was photographed and written by Alexandros Diamantis and directed by Dimitris Tzelas. This film is considered the peak of Greek straight to video cinematography amongst fans .
- as an effeminate hotel receptionist, in the 1988 gay-themed drama The Gays (Oi Omofylofiloi). A coming out story set in (then) contemporary Athens, this film focuses on the intertwining and allegedly true stories of three homosexual men. A film starring Michalis Maniatis, based on the book The Seeds of Cassandra (Ta paidia tis Cassandras) by Christos Lamprou.
- as the headmaster in the 1988 teen comedy A very zany high school (Super Koufo Kollegio), co-starring Yiorgos Floros and Nikos Tsachiridis.

=== Screenwriter and actor ===
- in the revue film Ta pires ola ki emeines. Directed by and co-written with Dimitris Tzelas.
- in the sex comedy O Anerastos, co-starring with Markos Lezes.
