= Ego (The Very Best of EMI Years) =

1995 album by Marinella

Ego (The Very Best Of EMI Years)

Greatest hits album by Marinella
- Released: 26 December 2005
- Recorded: Athens, 1957 – 1995
- Genre: World music, Folk, Laïko, Modern Laika
- Language: Greek
- Label: Minos EMI

Marinella chronology
The Universal Masters Collection (2005)	Ego (The Very Best Of EMI Years) (2005)	Sti Skini (2006)

Ego... Ichografisis 1957 – 1995 (Marinella: The very best of EMI years) (Greek: Εγώ… Ηχογραφήσεις 1957 – 1995; English: Me… Recordings 1957 – 1995) is a compilation of recordings by Greek singer Marinella, under the EMI series Capitol Original Masters. This album is part of the compilation. The 2-CD set includes 44 recordings from 1957 – 1995 for the Minos EMI Label and covers her early work with Stelios Kazantzidis and her later solo years. It also includes duets with Tolis Voskopoulos, Yiannis Parios and Kostas Spyropoulos. It was released on 26 December 2005 in Greece by Minos EMI.

== Track listing ==
=== Disc 1 ===
1. "I proti agapi sou ime ego" (in duet with Stelios Kazantzidis) - (Giorgos Mitsakis) – 3:10 – (Η πρώτη αγάπη σου είμαι εγώ)
  - This song had been released as a single in 1957.
2. "Irtha pali konta sou" feat. Yiota Lydia - (Stelios Kazantzidis) – 2:58 – (Ήρθα πάλι κοντά σου)
  - This song had been released as a single in 1959.
3. "Athena, Pireas, Thessaloniki" (in duet with Stelios Kazantzidis) - (Stelios Kazantzidis-Vasilis Karapatakis) – 2:57 – (Αθήνα, Πειραιάς, Θεσσαλονίκη)
  - This song had been released as a single in 1960.
4. "S' agapisa ke ponesa" (in duet with Stelios Kazantzidis) (Apostolos Kaldaras) – 2:49 – (Σ' αγάπησα και πόνεσα)
  - This song had been released as a single in 1964.
5. "Imaste adelfia" - (Mpampis Mpakalis) – 2:53 – (Είμαστε αδέλφια)
  - This song had been released as a single in 1965.
6. "Omorfi poli" feat. Chorus of the Greek National Opera - (Mikis Theodorakis-Giannis Theodorakis) – 3:25 – (Όμορφη πόλη)
  - This song had been released as a single in 1965.
7. "Agapi mou (Phaedra)" feat. Chorus of the Greek National Opera - (Mikis Theodorakis-Giannis Theodorakis) – 3:17 – (Αγάπη μου)
  - This song had been released as a single in 1965.
8. "Ftochopedo" – (Spilios Mentis-Yiannis Ritsos) – 2:43 – (Φτωχόπαιδο)
  - This song had been released as a single in 1966.
9. "Ta pallikaria" - (Yannis Markopoulos-Akos Daskalopoulos) – 2:18 – (Τα παλικάρια)
  - This song had been released on Kazantzidis & Marinella – Chrysos Diskos and as a single in 1965.
10. "Sta matia sou gennithikan" - (Yannis Markopoulos-Akos Daskalopoulos]) – 3:00 – (Στα μάτια σου γεννήθηκαν)
  - This song had been released on Kazantzidis & Marinella – Chrysos Diskos and as a single in 1965.
11. "Ti sou 'kana ke m' egkatelipses" - (Giorgos Zampetas-Kostas Manesis) – 3:04 – (Τι σου 'κανα και μ' εγκατέλειψες)
  - This song had been released as a single in 1965.
12. "Orea pou 'ne i Kyriaki" - (Giorgos Zampetas-Alekos Sakellarios) – 2:56 – (Ωραία που 'ναι η Κυριακή)
  - This song had been released as a single in 1966.
13. "Ine to stroma mou mono" - (Giorgos Zampetas-Alekos Sakellarios) – 2:46 – (Είναι το στρώμα μου μονό)
  - This song had been released as a single in 1966.
14. "Apopse chano mia psychi" feat. Marios Kostoglou - (Giorgos Katsaros-Pythagoras) – 3:11 – (Απόψε χάνω μια ψυχή)
  - This song had been released on Marinella and as a single in 1966.
15. "Klise ta matia sou, kardia mou" - (Giorgos Katsaros-Pythagoras) – 2:58 – (Κλείσε τα μάτια σου, καρδιά μου)
  - This song had been released on Marinella and as a single in 1966.
16. "Apopse pou malosame" - (Makis Tzortzatos-Pythagoras) – 2:49 – (Απόψε που μαλώσαμε)
  - This song had been released on Marinella and as a single in 1967.
17. "Etsi ein' i agapi" - (Giorgos Katsaros-Giorgos Papastefanou) – 2:15 – (Έτσι είν' η αγάπη)
  - This song had been released as a single in 1966.
18. "Pou na ise agapi mou" - (Giorgos Katsaros-Giorgos Papastefanou) – 2:34 – (Πού να είσαι αγάπη μου)
  - This song had been released as a single in 1966.
19. "Eklapsa chtes" - (Mimis Plessas-Akos Daskalopoulos) – 2:40 – (Έκλαψα χθες)
  - This song had been released on Marinella and as a single in 1966.
20. "Sti yeitonia" - (Aggelos Sempos-Lefteris Papadopoulos) – 2:48 – (Στη γειτονιά)
  - This song had been released on Marinella and as a single in 1965.
21. "Aryises" - (Christos Leontis-Lefteris Papadopoulos) – 2:50 – (Άργησες)
  - This song had been released on Anastasi Oneiron in 1966.
22. "Pare ta matia mou" - (Christos Leontis-Lefteris Papadopoulos) – 3:03 – (Πάρε τα μάτια μου)
  - This song had been released on Anastasi Oneiron in 1966.

=== Disc 2 ===
1. "Na 'se kala" - (Giannis Spanos-Pythagoras) – 3:18 – (Να 'σαι καλά)
  - This song had been released on Marinella & Voskopoulos.
2. "Irthe enas filos" - (Giannis Spanos-Pythagoras) – 3:31 – (Ήρθε ένας φίλος)
  - This song had been released on Marinella & Voskopoulos.
3. "Oli i zoi enas kaimos" (in duet with Tolis Voskopoulos) - (Tolis Voskopoulos-Mimis Theiopoulos) – 3:04 – (Όλη η ζωή ένας καημός)
  - This song had been released on Marinella & Voskopoulos.
4. "Vre ti ginete ston kosmo" feat. Tolis Voskopoulos - (Tolis Voskopoulos-Mimis Theiopoulos) – 2:46 – (Βρε τι γίνετε στον κόσμο)
  - This song had been released on Marinella & Voskopoulos.
5. "Echi o Theos" - (Giannis Spanos-Pythagoras) – 2:37 – (Έχει ο Θεός)
  - This song had been released on Marinella & Voskopoulos.
6. "Parapono" - (Tolis Voskopoulos-Mimis Theiopoulos) – 3:45 – (Παράπονο)
  - This song had been released on Marinella & Voskopoulos.
7. "S' ena fonto lefko" - (Vassilis Dimitriou) – 2:59 – (Σ' ένα φόντο λευκό)
  - This song had been released on soundtrack album I Prova Tou Nifikou.
8. "Prova nifikou" (Theme from I prova tou nifikou) - (Vassilis Dimitriou) – 4:02 – (Πρόβα νυφικού)
  - This song had been released on soundtrack album I Prova Tou Nifikou.
9. "I treli" - (Vassilis Dimitriou) – 3:32 – (Η τρελή)
  - This song had been released on soundtrack album I Prova Tou Nifikou.
10. "Ti ekana yia parti mou" feat. Argyris Koukas - (Thanasis Polykandriotis-Fotini Dourou) – 3:17 – (Τι έκανα για πάρτη μου)
  - This song had been released on To Ximeroma Tou Erota.
11. "Ego" - (Christos Nikolopoulos-Ifigeneia Giannopoulou) – 3:01 – (Εγώ)
  - This song had been released on To Ximeroma Tou Erota.
12. "Kouventes (Paroles, paroles)" (in duet with Kostas Spyropoulos) - (Gianni Ferrio-Leo Chiosso-Giancarlo Del Re-Evi Droutsa) – 3:04 – (Κουβέντες)
  - This song had been released on I Marinella Tragouda Megales Kyries.
13. "Pali berdeftika (Salma ya salama)" - (Sayed Darwish-Salah Jahin-Pierre Delanoë-Jeff Barnel-Evi Droutsa) – 3:38 – (Πάλι μπερδεύτηκα)
  - This song had been released on I Marinella Tragouda Megales Kyries.
14. "Thimase" feat. Dimitris Kokotas - (Takis Mousafiris) – 3:21 – (Θυμάσαι)
  - This song had been released on Lege Mou "S' agapo".
15. "Enas filos" - (Takis Mousafiris) – 3:33 – (Ένας φίλος)
  - This song had been released on Lege Mou "S' agapo".
16. "Ki' esy mou les 'Den xero'" - (Takis Mousafiris) – 2:52 – (Κι' εσύ μου λες "Δεν ξέρω")
  - This song had been released on Lege Mou "S' agapo".
17. "Thelo na t' akouo (Lege mou “S' agapo”)" - (Takis Mousafiris) – 2:54 – (Θέλω να τ' ακούω)
  - This song had been released on Lege Mou "S' agapo".
18. "Lege mou psemata" - (Giorgos Niarchos-Thanos Sofos) – 3:27 – (Λέγε μου ψέμματα)
  - This song had been released on Eisai Mia Thiella.
19. "Se yirevo pantou" - (Giorgos Niarchos-Thanos Sofos) – 2:46 – (Σε γυρεύω παντού)
  - This song had been released on Eisai Mia Thiella.
20. "Ise mia thiella" - (Alexis Papadimitriou-Evi Droutsa) – 3:24 – (Είσαι μια θύελλα)
  - This song had been released on Eisai Mia Thiella.
21. "Ke na pou yirises" (in duet with Yiannis Parios) - (Alexis Papadimitriou-Yiannis Parios) – 4:38 – (Και να που γύρισες)
  - This song had been released on Pistos in 1988.
22. "Tolmo" - (Alexis Papadimitriou-Evi Droutsa) – 3:02 – (Τολμώ)
  - This song had been released on Tolmo.
