= I Megaliteres Epitihies (Marinella album) =

Greatest hits album by Marinella
- Released: November, 2001
- Recorded: Athens, 1988–1995
- Genre: World music, Folk, Pop, Modern Laika
- Language: Greek
- Label: Minos EMI
- Producer: EMI

Marinella chronology
Ta Tragoudia Tou Aiona (2001)	I Megaliteres Epitihies (2001)	Chrysa Tragoudia (2002)

Marinella – I megaliteres epitihies tis (Greek: Μαρινέλλα – Οι μεγαλύτερες επιτυχίες της; Marinella – Her greatest hits) is a compilation of recordings by Greek singer Marinella, under the Minos EMI series I Megaliteres Epitihies (Greatest hits). This album is part of the compilation. It was released in November, 2001 in Greece and includes 16 studio recordings by Marinella from 1988 to 1995 for the Minos EMI.

== Track listing ==
1. "Tolmo" - (Alexis Papadimitriou-Evi Droutsa) – (Τολμώ; I dare)
  - This song had been released on Tolmo.
2. "Thelo na t' akouo" - (Takis Mousafiris) – (Θέλω να τ' ακούω; I want to hear it)
  - This song had been released on Lege Mou "S' agapo".
3. "Ise mia thiella" - (Alexis Papadimitriou-Evi Droutsa) – (Είσαι μια θύελλα; You're a storm)
  - This song had been released on Eisai Mia Thiella.
4. "Pali berdeftika (Salma ya salama)" - (Sayed Darwish-Salah Jahin-Pierre Delanoë-Jeff Barnel-Evi Droutsa) – (Πάλι μπερδεύτηκα; I'm confused, again)
  - This song had been released on I Marinella Tragouda Megales Kyries.
5. "Se yirevo pantou" - (Giorgos Niarchos-Thanos Sofos) – (Σε γυρεύω παντού; I'm looking everywhere for you)
  - This song had been released on Eisai Mia Thiella.
6. "Tris i ora" - (Thanasis Polykandriotis-Ifigeneia Giannopoulou) – (Τρεις η ώρα; Three o'clock p.m.)
  - This song had been released on To Ximeroma Tou Erota.
7. "Koursa thanatou" (in duet with Yiannis Parios) - (Alexis Papadimitriou-Evi Droutsa) – (Κούρσα θανάτου; Death race)
  - This song had been released on Tolmo.
8. "Prova nifikou" - (Vassilis Dimitriou) – (Πρόβα νυφικού; Fitting of the wedding dress)
  - This song had been released on I Prova Tou Nifikou.
9. "Emeis teriazoume" - (Giorgos Niarchos-Thanos Sofos) – (Εμείς ταιριάζουμε; We match)
  - This song had been released on Tolmo.
10. "Mesa s' ena tango" - (Vassilis Dimitriou) – (Μέσα σ' ένα τανγκό; In a tango)
  - This song had been released on I Prova Tou Nifikou.
11. "To ximeroma tou erota" - (Thanasis Polykandriotis-Ifigeneia Giannopoulou) – (Το ξημέρωμα του έρωτα; The dawn of love)
  - This song had been released on To Ximeroma Tou Erota.
12. "Treli" - (Vassilis Dimitriou) – (Τρελή; Crazy)
  - This song had been released on I Prova Tou Nifikou.
13. "Esy mou fernis tichi (Cuando salí de Cuba)" - (Luis Aguilé-Gian Pieretti-Giovanni Saugust-Evi Droutsa) – (Εσύ μου φέρνεις τύχη; You bring me luck)
  - This song had been released on I Marinella Tragouda Megales Kyries.
14. "Ti ekana gia parti mou" - (Thanasis Polykandriotis-Fotini Dourou) – (Τι έκανα για πάρτη μου; What did I do for myself)
  - This song had been released on To Ximeroma Tou Erota.
15. "Paradigmatos charin" - (Alexis Papadimitriou-Evi Droutsa) – 2:43 – (Παραδείγματος χάριν; For example)
  - This song had been released on Tolmo.
16. "Ah ke na ginomoun i agapi sou" - (Giorgos Niarchos-Argiro Sofou) – (Αχ και να γινόμουν η αγάπη σου; If only I became your love)
  - This song had been released on Tolmo.

== Personnel ==
- Marinella – vocals, background vocals
- Yiannis Parios – vocals
- Argiris Koukas – background vocals on "Ti ekana gia parti mou"
- Haris Andreadis – arranger, conductor
- Vassilis Dimitriou – arranger and conductor on tracks 8, 10, 12
- Takis Mousafiris – arranger and conductor on "Thelo na t' akouo"
- Minos EMI – producer
