= Ego =

Ego or EGO may refer to:

== Social sciences ==
- Ego (Freudian), one of the three constructs in Sigmund Freud's structural model of the psyche
- Egoism, an ethical theory that treats self-interest as the foundation of morality
- Egotism, the drive to maintain and enhance favorable views of oneself
- Egocentrism, the inability to differentiate between self and other
- Self-concept, a collection of beliefs about oneself that embodies the answer to "Who am I?"

== Arts and media ==
=== Film and television ===
- Ego (2013 film), an Indian Tamil-language romantic comedy
- Ego (2018 film), an Indian Telugu-language drama
- Ego (2021 film), a Spanish psychological horror film
- Ego (TV channel), a 2002–2021 Israeli men's-interest channel
- "Ego" (The Dead Zone), a 2007 TV episode
- "Ego" (Serial Experiments Lain), a 2003 TV episode

=== Music ===
==== Performers and labels ====
- Egó, a 1981–1984 Icelandic band
- EGO, a German record label founded by Joe Haider

==== Albums ====
- Ego (Oomph! album) or the title song, 2001
- Ego (Tony Williams Lifetime album), 1971
- Ego (The Very Best of EMI Years), by Marinella, or the 1993 title song (see below), 2005
- E.G.O., by Lucie Silvas, or the title song, 2018
- Ego, by B.A.P, 2017
- Ego, by Lina Larissa Strahl, 2017
- Ego, by RAC, 2017
- Ego, by Trinity the Tuck, 2022
- Ego (Super/Trip/Maniac), by Alex Vargas, 2019

==== Songs ====
- "Ego" (Beyoncé song), 2009
- "Ego" (Ella Eyre song), 2017
- "Ego" (Elton John song), 1978
- "Ego" (Halsey song), 2024
- "Ego" (Lali song), 2016
- "Ego" (The Saturdays song), 2010
- "Ego" (Willy William song), 2015
- "Ego", by 2hollis from Star, 2025
- "Ego", by Anson Lo, 2021
- "Ego", by BigBang from Alive, 2012
- "Ego", by Conrad Sewell from Precious, 2023
- "Ego", by Kim Wilde from Select, 1982
- "Ego", by Lauren Daigle from Lauren Daigle, 2023
- "Ego", by Marinella from To Ximeroma Tou Erota, 1993
- "Ego", by Milky Chance from Blossom, 2017
- "Ego", by Rag'n'Bone Man from Human, 2017
- "Ego", by Spunge from Room for Abuse, 2000
- "Outro: Ego", by BTS from Map of the Soul: 7, 2020

=== Other uses in arts and media ===
- Ego (game engine), a video game engine developed by Codemasters
- Ego the Living Planet, a comic book character from Marvel Comics
- European History Online, an academic website

== People ==
- Ego Lemos (born 1972), East Timorese musician
- Ego Leonard, Dutch visual artist
- Ego Nwodim (born 1988), American actress and comedian
- Ego Plum (born 1975), American film composer
- Paul Ego (born 1966), New Zealand comedian
- Prosper Ego (1927–2015), Dutch political activist
- Yuna Ego (born 2000), Japanese idol and member of music group SKE48

== Science and technology ==
- Ego (fish), a genus of gobiid fishes
- Ego (game engine), a video game engine developed by Codemasters
- EGO sensor, an oxygen sensor in gasoline engines
- EGOT (gene), previously known as EGO
- European Gravitational Observatory, or EGO

== Other uses ==
- Belgorod International Airport, in Russia
- Energica Ego, a motorcycle
