= Marinella & George Dalaras – Mazi =

Mazi

Live album by Marinella and George Dalaras
- Released: 18 March 2003
- Recorded: Athens Concert Hall, 19–24 November 2002
- Genres: World music; Folk; Modern Laika; Éntekhno
- Label: Minos EMI

Marinella chronology
Me Varka To Tragoudi (1999)	Marinella & George Dalaras – Mazi (2003)	Ammos Itane (2004)

George Dalaras chronology
Apo Kardias (2002)	Marinella & George Dalaras – Mazi (2003)	Afieroma Ston Marko Vamvakari (2003)

Mazi (Greek: Μαζί; English: Together) is a live album by Greek singers Marinella and George Dalaras. The concert was recorded at the Athens Concert Hall in November 2002. It was released in the 18th of March, 2003 in Greece by Minos EMI and it went Platinum selling over 40,000 units.

== Track listing ==
1. "T' asteri tou voria" (Τ' αστέρι του βοριά) – (Manos Hatzidakis - Nikos Gatsos) – 2:01
2. "Athanasia" (Αθανασία) – (Manos Hatzidakis - Nikos Gatsos) – 3:51
3. "To pelago ine vathy" (Το πέλαγο είναι βαθύ) – (Manos Hatzidakis) – 3:27
4. "Mpaxe Tsifliki" (Μπαξέ Τσιφλίκι) – (Vassilis Tsitsanis) – 3:01
5. "I proti agapi sou" (Η πρώτη αγάπη σου) – (Giorgos Mitsakis) – 2:18
6. "Me to voria" (Με το βοριά) – (Giorgos Zampetas - Dimitris Christodoulou) – 2:40
7. "Den thelo pia na xanarthis" (Δεν θέλω πια να ξαναρθείς) – (Manolis Chiotis) – 3:02
8. "Afou to thes" (Αφού το θες) – (Manolis Chiotis) – 2:31
9. "O,ti tragoudo" (Ό,τι τραγουδώ) – (Stamatis Kraounakis - Yannis Xanthoulis) – 4:07
10. "Ki emeis sta synnefa (Gilda)" (Κι εμείς στα σύννεφα) – (Nikos Antipas - Lina Nikolakopoulou) – 4:12
11. "O mare e tu (I thalassa ki esy)" (Η θάλασσα κι εσύ) – (Enzo Griagnaniello - Lina Nikolakopoulou) – 5:09
12. "Parapono" (Παράπονο) – (Mikis Theodorakis - Dimitris Christodoulou) – 4:15
13. "Sta chronia tis ypomonis" (Στα χρόνια της υπομονής) – (Stavros Kouyioumtzis - Manos Eleftheriou) – 2:12
14. "Den xero poso s' agapo" (Δεν ξέρω πόσο σ' αγαπώ) – (Apostolos Kaldaras - Christos Argiropoulos) – 2:46
15. "To pepromeno" (Το πεπρωμένο) – (Vassilis Dimitriou) – 3:03
16. "Piretos" (Πυρετός) – (Akis Panou) – 2:55
17. "Stalia - stalia" (Σταλιά - σταλιά) – (Giorgos Zampetas - Dionisis Tzefronis) – 3:00
18. "As pan stin efchi ta palia" (Ας παν στην ευχή τα παλιά) – (Apostolos Kaldaras) – 3:05
19. "Tora pou fevgo ap' ti zoi" (Τώρα που φεύγω απ' τη ζωή) – (Stelios Kazantzidis - Eftychia Papagianopoulou) – 3:18
20. "Ti na thimitho, ti na xechaso" (Τι να θυμηθώ, τι να ξεχάσω) – (Apostolos Kaldaras - Pythagoras) – 1:27
21. "Prin to telos (I giardini di marzo)" (Πριν το τέλος) – (Lucio Battisti - Lina Nikolakopoulou) – 3:01

== Music videos ==
- "O mare e tu (I thalassa ki' esy)" - Director: Christos Dimas
- "Prin to telos" - Director: Nikos Soulis
