= I Marinella Tragouda Megales Kyries =

Studio album by Marinella
- Released: 1992
- Recorded: Athens, 1992, studio Polysound
- Genre: World music; folk; pop; jazz
- Length: 33:21
- Language: Greek
- Label: Minos EMI
- Producer: Achilleas Theofilou

Marinella chronology
Ta Tragoudia Tis Amerikis (1991)	I Marinella Tragouda Megales Kyries (1992)	To Ximeroma Tou Erota (1993)

I Marinella tragouda Megales Kyries (Greek: Η Μαρινέλλα τραγουδά Μεγάλες Κυρίες; Marinella sings Great Ladies) is a studio album by Greek singer Marinella. It was released in 1992 by Minos EMI in Greece. This album was issued in mono and stereo. The stereo version of this album was released on CD in the same year by Minos EMI.

== Track listing ==
Side One.

1. "Pali berdeftika (Salma ya salama)" (Πάλι μπερδεύτηκα) – (Sayed Darwish-Salah Jahin-Pierre Delanoë-Jeff Barnel – Evi Droutsa) – 3:40
2. "Arketa os edo (When You Smile)" (Αρκετά ως εδώ) – (William Salter-Ralph MacDonald – Evi Droutsa) – 3:01
3. "Gi' agapi mi milas (Whatever Lola Wants)" (Γι' αγάπη μη μιλάς) – (Jerry Ross-Richard Adler – Evi Droutsa) – 2:59
4. "Esy mou fernis tichi (Cuando salí de Cuba)" (Εσύ μου φέρνεις τύχη) – (Luis Aguilé-Gian Pieretti-Giovanni Saugust – Evi Droutsa) – 3:34
5. "Pos allaxe i zoi (Libertango)" (Πώς άλλαξε η ζωή) – (Ástor Piazzolla – Evi Droutsa) – 4:33

Side Two.

1. "Kouventes (Paroles, paroles)" (Κουβέντες) in duet with Kostas Spyropoulos – (Gianni Ferrio-Leo Chiosso-Giancarlo Del Re – Evi Droutsa) – 3:06
2. "Se niotho pantou (The Rhythm Divine)" (Σε νιώθω παντού) – (Boris Blank-Dieter Meier-Billy Mackenzie – Yiannis Parios) – 3:08
3. "Dikeoma mou (La filanda / É ou não é)" (Δικαίωμα μου) – (Alberto Janes-Vito Pallavicini – Evi Droutsa) – 3:14
4. "Agapi (I who have nothing / Uno dei tanti)" (Αγάπη) – (Carlo Donida-Giulio "Mogol" Rapetti-Jerry Leiber-Mike Stoller – Evi Droutsa) – 3:59
5. "Fotia mes sti fotia (Coimbra)" (Φωτιά μες στη φωτιά) – (Raul Ferrão-José Galhardo – Evi Droutsa) – 3:27

== Personnel ==
- Marinella – vocals
- Kostas Spyropoulos – vocals
- Haris Andreadis – arranger, conductor
- Argiris Koukas, Anna Zisi, Spyros Spirakis, Nikoletta Maria Rousea, Stelios Goulielmos, Elina Konstantopoulou – background vocals
- Dinos Diamantopoulos – photographer
