= Akou Sopa =

Single by Ivi Adamou
- Released: 18 July 2016
- Recorded: 2016
- Genre: Pop
- Length: 3:41
- Label: Rootopia; Minos EMI
- Songwriters: Yerai Jose Blanco Garcia; Sunny Baltzi; Michalis Kouinelis
- Producer: Eloy Perez

Ivi Adamou singles chronology
"Tipota De Mas Stamata" (2016)	"Akou Sopa" (2016)	"Afto Ton Kero" (2017)

"Akou Sopa" (Greek: Άκου σώπα; English: Listen hush) is a song recorded by Greek Cypriot singer Ivi Adamou. It is a cover of the Spanish song "Un Bonito Final" originally by Los Rebujitos. The song was written by Los Rebujitos member Yerai Blanco García with Sunny Baltzi and Michalis Kouinelis writing the Greek lyrics for Adamou's version. It was digitally released on 18 July 2016 through the iTunes Store.

"Akou Sopa" received critical acclaim from critics, who praised the song's melodic sounds and also compared it with the original version. Its accompanying music video was directed by Dimitris Sylvestros and premiered along with the song on 17 July 2016.

== Background and release ==
Adamou announced the release of a new song through her Facebook page on 11 July 2016, when she posted part of the single's artwork with the caption "18/07... #newsong". The teaser of both the song and its accompanying music video were leaked the same day. The full artwork of the song was unveiled on 12 July 2016, with the title of the song and the teaser being revealed as well. The song and its music video were premiered on 17 July 2016 with Adamou posting it on her Facebook page.

== Critical reception ==
The song received mostly positive feedback from reviewers. Padraig Muldoon of Eurovision blog Wiwibloggs said that the song shows a more vulnerable side of the singer, compared to her Eurovision entry and that "[Adamou] manages to make the track her own, bringing a fresh interpretation with different levels of light and dark". Kiki Vasiliadou of Energy Radio described the song as one of the "most melodic and interesting [song] we've heard lately". Lamianow's Dimitra Yiotidou described the song as "travelling, melodic and sensitive".

== Music video ==
The song's accompanying music video was shot in June 2016 and was directed by Dimitris Sylvestros, who also was in charge for the direction of the music video of Adamou's previous single, "Tipota De Mas Stamata". The teaser of the music video was first seen on 11 July 2016, after it was leaked. The music video premiered on 17 July 2016 and shows Adamou alone in a room through day and night, winter and summer.

== Credits and personnel ==
- Ivi Adamou – lead vocals
- Michalis Kouinelis – writer
- Sunny Baltzi – writer
- Eloy Perez – producer
- Marcel Van Gennip – drums
- Robin Freyer – bass guitar
- Marko Katier – guitar, electric guitar, programming, arrangement
- Jairo Blanco – guitar
- Gijs Brouwer – percussion
- Agustin Henke – percussion
- Sanne Spijkers – keyboard
- Aitor Garcia – arrangement
- Lara Sanson – violin
- Alvaro Larrañaga – programming

== Release history ==
Region	Date	Format	Label
Cyprus	18 July 2016	Digital download	Rootopia; Minos EMI
Greece	18 July 2016	Digital download	Rootopia; Minos EMI
