= I Megaliteres Epitihies =

I Megaliteres Epitihies may refer to:

- I Megaliteres Epitihies (Mando album)
- I Megaliteres Epitihies (Marinella album)
