= Ta Tragoudia Tis Amerikis =

Studio album by Stelios Kazantzidis & Marinella
- Released: 1991
- Recorded: Athens, March, 1959
- Genre: World music; Folk; Laïko; Zeibekiko
- Length: 74:48
- Language: Greek
- Label: MBI (Music Box International)
- Producer: Dimitris Ranios

Stelios Kazantzidis chronology
Eleftheros (1988)	Ta Tragoudia Tis Amerikis (1991)	Vradiazei (1992)

Marinella chronology
Lege Mou "S' agapo" (1990)	Ta Tragoudia Tis Amerikis (1991)	I Marinella Tragouda Megales Kyries (1992)

Ta tragoudia tis Amerikis (Greek: Τα τραγούδια της Αμερικής; The songs of America) is a double studio album by Greek singers Stelios Kazantzidis and Marinella. It was released in 1991 by MBI (Music Box International) in Greece and it contains 28 rare recordings that were recorded by Stelios Kazantzidis and Marinella in 1959 and some of those were released on 7" rpm vinyl records in United States, by NINA Records.

This album was issued in mono and stereo. The stereo version of this album was released on CD in 1995 with eight fewer tracks and six years after, in 2001, was re-issued on a 2-CD set with the same 28 tracks as the original album by MBI.

== Track listing ==
=== Disc 1 ===
Side One.

1. "Zinguala" (Ζιγκουάλα) – (Stelios Kazantzidis-Nikos Mourkakos) – 2:58
2. "Dio Portes Echi i Zoi" (Δυο πόρτες έχει η ζωή) – (Stelios Kazantzidis – Eftychia Papagianopoulou) – 3:02
3. "Den se lismono" (Δεν σε λησμονώ) – (Vasilis Karapatakis) – 3:10
4. "Ap' ta psila sta hamila" (Απ' τα ψηλά στα χαμηλά) – (Apostolos Kaldaras – Eftychia Papagianopoulou) – 3:05
5. "Polles manades klapsane" (Πολλές μανάδες κλάψανε) – (Giannis Tatassopoulos – Nikos Routsos) – 2:56
6. "Ise i zoi mou" (Είσαι η ζωή μου) – (Theodoros Derveniotis – Eftychia Papagianopoulou) – 3:07
7. "Vre, san ta chionia" (Βρε, σαν τα χιόνια) – (Manolis Chiotis – Christos Kolokotronis) – 2:42

Side Two.

1. "Afti i nichta meni" (Αυτή η νύχτα μένει) – (Stelios Kazantzidis) – 2:54
2. "Pios tha me pliroforisi" (Ποιος θα με πληροφορήσει) – (Apostolos Kaldaras – Eftychia Papagianopoulou) – 2:50
3. "Fevgo me pikra sta xena" (Φεύγω με πίκρα στα ξένα) – (Stelios Kazantzidis – Eftychia Papagianopoulou) – 3:10
4. "Enocho chrima" (Ένοχο χρήμα) – (Stelios Kazantzidis – Eftychia Papagianopoulou) – 3:15
5. "Whisky, jin ke frumel" (Ουίσκι, τζιν και φρούμελ) – (Christos Kolokotronis – Vasilis Karapatakis) – 2:59
6. "To pedi mou perimeno" (Το παιδί μου περιμένω) – (Theodoros Derveniotis) – 3:02
7. "Xechase me – xechase me" (Ξέχασε με – ξέχασε με) – (Babis Bakalis – Kostas Virvos) – 2:43

=== Disc 2 ===
Side One.

1. "Gia 'mas pote min ximerosi" (Για 'μας ποτέ μην ξημερώσει) – (Stelios Kazantzidis – Nikos Mourkakos) – 3:08
2. "Kinonia enochi" (Κοινωνία ένοχη) – (Stelios Kazantzidis – Christos Kolokotronis) – 2:55
3. "Iliovasilemata" (Ηλιοβασιλέματα) – (Manolis Chiotis – Eftychia Papagianopoulou) – 2:52
4. "Apopse me parapono" (Απόψε με παράπονο) – (Stelios Kazantzidis) – 2:55
5. "Mou to ipan oli i fili" (Μου το είπαν όλοι οι φίλοι) – (Stelios Kazantzidis) – 2:58
6. "Fevgo manoula mou glikia" (Φεύγω μανούλα μου γλυκιά) – (Theodoros Derveniotis – Christos Kolokotronis) – 2:59
7. "Isos avrio" (Ίσως αύριο) – (Vassilis Tsitsanis) – 2:38

Side Two.

1. "I proti agapi sou ime ego" (Η πρώτη αγάπη σου είμαι εγώ) – (Giorgos Mitsakis) – 2:49
2. "Tha vro mourmouri baglama" (Θα βρω μουρμούρη μπαγλαμά) – (Apostolos Kaldaras – Eftychia Papagianopoulou) – 2:55
3. "To telefteo rantevou" (Το τελευταίο ραντεβού) – (Giannis Tatassopoulos – Nikos Routsos) – 3:00
4. "San synnefiasmeni mera" (Σαν συννεφιασμένη μέρα) – (Babis Bakalis – Charalambos Vasiliadis) – 2:23
5. "Gitonopoula omorfi" (Γειτονοπούλα όμορφη) – (Theodoros Derveniotis – Charalambos Vasiliadis) – 2:23
6. "Val' to kokkino foustani" (Βάλ' το κόκκινο φουστάνι) – (Theodoros Derveniotis – Kostas Kofiniotis) – 2:30
7. "I gineka pou m' aresi" (Η γυναίκα που μ' αρέσει) – (Giorgos Trimis – Kostas Mpitinis) – 2:30

== Personnel ==
- Stelios Kazantzidis – vocals
- Marinella – vocals, background vocals
- Giannis Tatasopoulos – bouzouki
- Dimitris Ranios – producer
- Thodoris Chrysanthopoulos – Digital Mastering
