= Afto Ton Kero =

Single by Ivi Adamou
- Language: Greek
- English title: "This Time"
- Released: 10 March 2017
- Recorded: 2016
- Genre: Pop
- Length: 3:16
- Label: Rootopia; Minos EMI
- Songwriter(s): Michalis Kouinelis
- Producer(s): Kouinelis

Ivi Adamou singles chronology
"Akou Sopa" (2016)	"Afto Ton Kero" (2017)

"Afto Ton Kero" (Greek: Αυτό τον καιρό; transl. This time) is a song recorded by Greek Cypriot singer Ivi Adamou. It was released on 10 March 2017. The song is written and produced by Michalis Kouinelis.

== Background and release ==
The song was first teased when Adamou posted a photo from the shooting of its music video. During an interview on the ANT1 talk show The 2Night Show, a short clip from the song was shown. The teaser was officially released on 6 March 2017 along with the title of the song, "Afto Ton Kero".

== Music video ==
The music video for the song was shot in January 2017; Adamou posted a photo from the shooting of the music video on 27 January 2017. It was released on the same day the song was released digitally, on 10 March 2017. The video was directed by Dimitris Sylvestros, who also directed the music videos for Adamou's two previous singles, "Tipota De Mas Stamata" and "Akou Sopa".

== Credits and personnel ==
- Ivi Adamou – lead vocals
- Michalis Kouinelis – writer, recording, orchestration, programming, producer
- Vaggelis Georgantzis – mixing, mastering, keyboard, orchestration, programming
- Vaggelis Papanastasiou – clarinet
- Nikos Karayiannis – acoustic and electric guitar
- Theodoros Bozentomov – bass
- Rejo Jo – drums

== Release history ==
Region	Date	Format	Label
Cyprus	10 March 2017	Digital download	Rootopia; Minos EMI
Greece	10 March 2017	Digital download	Rootopia; Minos EMI
