= Ammos itane =

Ammos Itane

Studio album by Marinella
- Released: 30 March 2004
- Recorded: Athens, 2004, studio Odeon
- Genres: World music; Folk; Éntekhno; Modern Laika
- Length: 41:17
- Language: Greek
- Label: EMI
- Producer: Minos EMI

Marinella chronology
Marinella & George Dalaras – Mazi (2003)	Ammos Itane (2004)	Tipota Den Ginete Tihea (2005)

Ammos itane... (Greek: Άμμος ήτανε...; English: It was sand...) is a studio album by Greek singer Marinella. It was entirely composed by Nikos Antypas in a folk style, with lyrics by Lina Nikolakopoulou. Released on 30 March 2004 in Greece and Cyprus by EMI Records, the album went gold, selling over 20,000 units.

== Track listing ==
1. "Mesimeri" (Μεσημέρι; Νoon) – 5:26
2. "Gialini kardia (Ammos itane...)" (Γυάλινη καρδιά; Heart of glass) – 3:53
3. "Thavmata" (Θαύματα; Miracles) – (Lyrics by Nikos Antypas) – 4:17
4. "Yparchoune dromoi" (Υπάρχουνε δρόμοι; There are streets) – 4:38
5. "Ah na xypnousa" (Αχ να ξυπνούσα; Ah, if I could wake up) – 3:28
6. "Floga" (Φλόγα; Flame) – 3:39
7. "Skala" (Σκάλα; Staircase) – 3:51
8. "Sta cheria tis vradias" (Στα χέρια της βραδιάς; In the hands of the night) – 4:01
9. "Na leei t' onoma sou" (Να λέει τ' όνομα σου; To say your name) – 3:03
10. "To louloudi" (Το λουλούδι; The flower) – 3:58
11. "Mesotichia" (Μεσοτοιχία; Party wall) – 3:03

== Music videos ==
- "Mesimeri" - Director: Nikos Soulis
- "Gialini kardia (Ammos itane...)" - Director: Nikos Soulis
- "Thavmata" - Director: Nikos Soulis

== Personnel ==
- Marinella - vocals, background vocals
- Argiris Koukas - background vocals on track 10
- Nikos Antypas - arranger, conductor
- Minos EMI - producer
- Yiannis Smyrneos - recording engineer
- Dinos Diamantopoulos - photographer
- Achilleas Haritos - make-up artist
- Dimitris Th. Arvanitis - artwork
