= Epitaph (disambiguation) =

An epitaph is an inscription honoring a deceased person, usually on a tombstone or plaque.

Epitaph may also refer to:

== Film ==
- Epitaph (2007 film), a 2007 South Korean film
- Epitaph (2015 film), a 2015 Mexican film

== Publishing ==
- The Tombstone Epitaph, a former newspaper and current magazine published in Tombstone, Arizona

== Music ==
- Epitaph Records, an American record label
- Epitaph (band), a German rock band

=== Classical ===
- Epitaph, composition by Hans Werner Henze
- The Epitaph, Надгробное письмо 1894 song by Mussorgsky
- "Epitaph", song by Phyllis Tate (1911–1985)
- "An Epitaph", song by Ivor Gurney

=== Albums ===
- Epitaph World Tour, a 2011 farewell tour by Judas Priest
  - Epitaph (video), video of said tour
- Epitaph (Charles Mingus composition)
- Epitaph (King Crimson album)
- Epitaph (Front Line Assembly album)
- Epitaph (Necrophagist album)
- Epitaph (Tohoshinki EP)

=== Songs ===
- "Epitaph" (King Crimson song), a song by King Crimson from their 1969 album In the Court of the Crimson King
- "Epitaph", a song by Trees from their 1970 album The Garden of Jane Delawney
- "Epitaph (Black and Blue)", a song by Kris Kristofferson from his 1971 album The Silver Tongued Devil and I
- "Epitaph", a song by Camel from their 1975 album The Snow Goose
- "Epitaph", a song by Judas Priest from their 1976 album Sad Wings of Destiny
- "Epitaph", a 1981 single by The Wall
- "Epitaph", a song by Badly Drawn Boy from his 2000 album The Hour of Bewilderbeast
- "Epitáfio", a song by Brazilian rock band Titãs from 2002 album A Melhor Banda de Todos os Tempos da Última Semana
- "Epitaph", a song by Hey Rosetta! from their 2006 album Plan Your Escape
- "Epitaph", a song by Hippo Campus from their 2017 album Landmark
- "Epitaph (For the Future)", a song by Tohoshinki from their 2022 extended play Epitaph
- "Epitaph", a song by Necrophagist from their 2004 album Epitaph

== See also ==
- Epitafios, an Argentine TV series
- Epitaphios (disambiguation)
