= Me Varka To Tragoudi =

Live album by Marinella
- Released: November 20, 1999
- Recorded: September 1999
- Genre: World music; Folk; Éntekhno; Modern Laika
- Language: Greek; Spanish; Portuguese; Neapolitan; Griko; Romani; Turkish
- Label: BMG Greece; RCA
- Producer: Lambros Liavas; Yiannis Smyrneos

Marinella chronology
I Marinella Tragouda Ke Thimate (1998)	Me Varka To Tragoudi (1999)	Marinella & George Dalaras – Mazi (2003)

Me varka… to tragoudi (Greek: Με βάρκα… το τραγούδι; English: With boat… the song) is the name of a live album by Greek singer Marinella. The concert was recorded at the Odeon of Herodes Atticus in Athens, on September 18, 1999. It was released on November 20, 1999 in Greece and Cyprus by BMG Greece and it went platinum seven months after its release, selling over 50,000 units.

The musical performance premiered at the Theatre of the Earth in Thessaloniki on September 1, 1999 and was also presented at the Athens Concert Hall on October 18, 1999, and at the small Olympic Stadium on October 1, 1999.

== Track listing ==
=== Disc 1 ===
1. "Pame sto agnosto" (Πάμε στο άγνωστο) – (Menelaos Theofanidis - Dimitris Evaggelidis) – 3:03
2. "Heretismos" (Χαιρετισμός) – 0:52
3. "Thalassografia" (Θαλασσογραφία) – (Dionysis Savvopoulos) – 3:26
4. "Andra mou paei" (Άντρα μου πάει) – (Franco Corlianò) – 4:04
5. "Luna rossa" – (Viscione Antonio - Vincenzo De Crescenza) – 3:34
6. "Solidão" – (Joaquim Frederico De Brito - Ferrer Trindande) – 2:52
7. "Piensa en mí" – (Agustín Lara) – 4:15
8. "Bésame Mucho" – (Consuelo Velázquez) – 3:30
9. "Rom" (Ρομ) – (Nikos Kypourgos - Traditional Romani lyrics) – 2:31
10. "Thalassografia" (Θαλασσογραφία) – (Dionysis Savvopoulos) – 1:10
11. "Ena tragoudi ap' t' Algeri" (Ένα τραγούδι απ' τ' Αλγέρι) – (Vassilis Tsitsanis) / "Nichtes magikes" (Νύχτες μαγικές) – (Apostolos Kaldaras) – 2:43
12. "Misirlou" (Μισιρλού) – (Nikos Roumpanis) – 3:35
13. "Smyrneikos amanes" (Σμυρναίικος αμανές) – (Traditional song of Smyrna) – 3:45
14. "Ti se melli esenane" (Τι σε μέλλει εσένανε) – (Traditional song of Asia Minor) – 2:39
15. "Lili, i skandaliara" (Λιλή, η σκανταλιάρα) – (Panagiotis Toundas) – 3:42
16. "Pou na vro gyneka na sou miazi" (Πού να βρω γυναίκα να σου μοιάζει) – (Antonis Ntalgas - Kostas Anatolitis) – 2:27
17. "Den se thelo pia" (Δεν σε θέλω πια) – (Neapolitan Canzonetta with Greek lyrics of Smyrna) – 1:44
18. "Tsantirim (Çadırımın Üstüne)" (Τσαντιρίμ) – (Traditional Turkish Karsilamas, adaptation by Stelios Kazantzidis) – 3:44

=== Disc 2 ===
1. "Glikocharazi, xypnise" (Γλυκοχαράζει, ξύπνησε) – (Giorgos Zampetas - Charalambos Vasiliadis) / "Tha 'thela na isoun" (Θα 'θελα να ήσουν) – (Giorgos Hadjinasios - Nikos Vrettos) – 4:27
2. "Kita me sta matia" (Κοίτα με στα μάτια) – (Akis Panou) – 2:34
3. "Den ine pou fevgis" (Δεν είναι που φεύγεις) – (Giorgos Hadjinasios - Michalis Koufianakis) – 3:31
4. "Fovame" (Φοβάμαι) – (Kostas Hatzis - Danai Stratigopoulou) / "Trelos i pallikari" (Τρελός ή παλικάρι) – (Kostas Hatzis - Sotia Tsotou) – 2:41
5. "Tolmo" (Τολμώ; I dare) – (Alexis Papadimitriou - Evi Droutsa) – 3:24
6. "Liga logia gia to taxidi" (Λίγα λόγια για το ταξίδι) – 0:59
7. "Kles" (Κλαις) with the voice of Sofia Vembo – (Leo Rapitis - Kostas Kofiniotis) – 3:56
8. "Ti na ftei" (Τι να φταίει) – (Giorgos Zampetas - Dimitris Christodoulou) – 3:01
9. "Zografismena sto charti" (Ζωγραφισμένα στο χαρτί) – (Mimis Plessas - Akos Daskalopoulos) – 2:27
10. "Pervolia" (Περβόλια) – (Mikis Theodorakis) – 5:10
11. "To klama tis penias" (Το κλάμα της πενιάς) – (Manolis Chiotis - Christos Kolokotronis) / "Kardia mou papse na ponas" (Καρδιά μου πάψε να πονάς) – (Manolis Chiotis - Emilios Savvidis) – 4:57
12. "Proti mou fora" (Πρώτη μου φορά) – (Nini Zaha) – 4:29
13. "Anixe petra" (Άνοιξε πέτρα) – (Mimis Plessas - Lefteris Papadopoulos) – 4:06
14. "Kamia fora" (Καμιά φορά) – (Giorgos Hadjinasios - Michalis Bourboulis) – 5:13

== Music videos ==
- "Thalassografia" - Director: Giannis Kalogeropoulos
- "Kita me sta matia" - Director: Giannis Kalogeropoulos

== Personnel ==
- Marinella – vocals
- Stelios Stavrakis, Olga Spanou, Mania Evangeliou, Kostas Triantafyllidis – background vocals
- Lambros Liavas – producer
- Yiannis Smyrneos – producer, recording engineer
- Kostas Klavvas – arranger (and conductor on Disc 1)
- Giorgos Niarchos – conductor on Disc 2 (and arranger on tracks "Tolmo", "Ti na ftei" and "Zografismena sto harti")
- Tasos Vrettos – photographer
- Achilleas Haritos – make-up artist
- Vaggelis Hatzis – hair stylist
- Antonis Glykos – artwork
