= Engo =

Engo may refer to:

- ENGO, (environmental non-governmental organization), non-governmental organization in the field of environmentalism
- Engø, peninsula in Sandefjord Municipality in Vestfold county, Norway
- Paul Engo (1931 – 2010), Cameroonian diplomat, judge and triple jumper who represented Nigeria at the 1956 Summer Olympics in Melbourne
- Linn Engø (born 1993), Norwegian politician for the Labour Party
- Engo Kokugon (1063–1135), Han Chinese Chan monk who compiled the Blue Cliff Record
- Engo eyewear (company), Augmented reality technology company

== See also ==
- Ego (disambiguation)
- Eno (disambiguation)
