= Marinella & Voskopoulos =

Studio album by Marinella & Tolis Voskopoulos
- Released: 1974
- Recorded: Athens, 1974, studio Polysound
- Genres: World music; folk; modern laika
- Language: Greek
- Label: Minos EMI
- Producer: Achilleas Theofilou

Marinella chronology
Marinella Gia Panta (1974)	Marinella & Voskopoulos (1974)	Marinella & Tolis Voskopoulos – Ego Ki' Esy (1974)

Tolis Voskopoulos chronology
As Imaste Realiste (1973)	Marinella & Voskopoulos (1974)	Marinella & Tolis Voskopoulos – Ego Ki' Esy (1974)

Marinella & Voskopoulos (Greek: Μαρινέλλα & Βοσκόπουλος) is a studio album by Greek singers Marinella and Tolis Voskopoulos. It was released in 1974 by Minos EMI in Greece. This album was issued in mono and stereo. The stereo version of this album was released on CD in 1994 by EMI.

== Track listing ==
Side one.

1. "Den echi dromo na diavis" (Δεν έχει δρόμο να διαβείς; There's not street to cross) – (Tolis Voskopoulos – Mimis Theiopoulos)
2. "Ti ichame – ti chasame" (Τι είχαμε – τι χάσαμε; What we had – what we missed) – (Voskopoulos – Tasos Economou)
3. "Parapono" (Παράπονο; Complaint) – (Voskopoulos – Theiopoulos)
4. "Pou pigenis Katinaki" (Πού πηγαίνεις Κατινάκι; Katinaki, where are you going?) – (Voskopoulos – Theiopoulos)
5. "Vre ti ginete ston kosmo" (Βρε τι γίνεται στον κόσμο; Hey, what happens in the world) – (Voskopoulos – Theiopoulos)
6. "Oli i zoi enas kaimos" (Όλη η ζωή ένας καημός; All life is a sorrow) – (Voskopoulos – Theiopoulos)

Side two.

1. "Na 'se kala" (Να 'σαι καλά; Thanks a lot) – (Giannis Spanos – Pythagoras)
2. "Se sygchoro" (Σε συγχωρώ; I forgive you) – (Giannis Spanos – Pythagoras)
3. "Echi o Theos" (Έχει ο Θεός; God has in store) – (Giannis Spanos – Pythagoras)
4. "Pos" (Πώς; How?) – (Giannis Spanos – Pythagoras)
5. "Pos den sou paei" (Πως δεν σου πάει; That doesn't suit you) – (Giannis Spanos – Pythagoras)
6. "Irthe enas filos" (Ήρθε ένας φίλος; A friend came) – (Giannis Spanos – Pythagoras)

== Personnel ==
- Marinella – vocals, background vocals
- Tolis Voskopoulos – vocals, background vocals, arranger and conductor on tracks 1 – 6
- Giannis Spanos – arranger and conductor on tracks 7 – 12
- Achilleas Theofilou – producer
- Yiannis Smyrneos – recording engineer
- Babis Benakis – photographer
