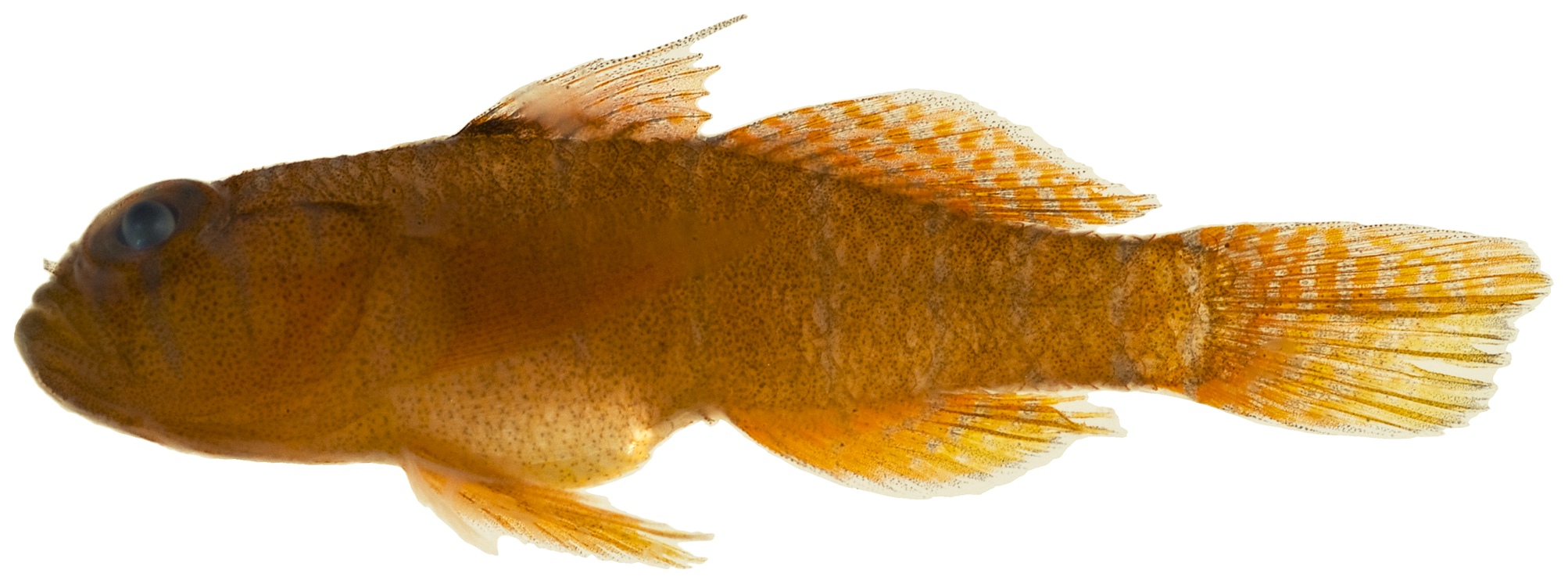
- Priolepis hipoliti

Scientific classification
- Kingdom: Animalia
- Phylum: Chordata
- Class: Actinopterygii
- Order: Gobiiformes
- Family: Gobiidae
- Subfamily: Gobiinae
- Genus: Priolepis; Valenciennes, 1837

Type species
- Priolepis mica Ehrenberg, 1837

Synonyms
- Cingulogobius Herre, 1927; Cremornea Whitley, 1962; Ego Randall, 1994 Pleurogobius Seale, 1910; Quisquilius Jordan & Evermann, 1903; Zonogobius Bleeker, 1874

= Priolepis =

Genus of fishes

Priolepis is a genus of fish in the family Gobiidae with a cosmopolitan distribution.

== Species ==
There are currently 39 recognized species in this genus:

- Priolepis agrena R. Winterbottom & M. E. Burridge, 1993 (Network reefgoby)
- Priolepis ailina R. Winterbottom & M. E. Burridge, 1993
- Priolepis aithiops R. Winterbottom & M. E. Burridge, 1992 (Drab reefgoby)
- Priolepis akihitoi Hoese & Larson, 2010 (Emperor reefgoby)
- Priolepis anthioides (J. L. B. Smith, 1959)
- Priolepis ascensionis (C. E. Dawson & A. J. Edwards, 1987) (Ascension Island saw-scaled goby)
- Priolepis aureoviridis (Gosline, 1959) (Yellow-green reefgoby)
- Priolepis billbrooksi Allen, Erdmann & Brooks, 2018 (Citron mudgoby)
- Priolepis boreus (Snyder, 1909)
- Priolepis cincta (Regan, 1908) (Girdled reefgoby)
- Priolepis compita R. Winterbottom, 1985 (Crossroads reefgoby)
- Priolepis cyanocephala Hoese & Larson, 2010
- Priolepis dawsoni D. W. Greenfield, 1989
- Priolepis duostella Koeda, Koido, Matsuno & Endo, 2021
- Priolepis eugenia (D. S. Jordan & Evermann, 1903) (Noble reefgoby)
- Priolepis fallacincta R. Winterbottom & M. E. Burridge, 1992 (Eight-bar reefgoby)
- Priolepis farcimen (D. S. Jordan & Evermann, 1903) (Farcimen reefgoby)
- Priolepis formosa Chen, Chen & Harefa, 2024
- Priolepis goldshmidtae Goren & Baranes, 1995
- Priolepis hipoliti (Metzelaar, 1922) (Rusty reefgoby)
- Priolepis inhaca (J. L. B. Smith, 1949) (Brick reefgoby)
- Priolepis kappa R. Winterbottom & M. E. Burridge, 1993 (Kappa reefgoby)
- Priolepis latifascima R. Winterbottom & M. E. Burridge, 1993
- Priolepis limbatosquamis (Gosline, 1959) (Rimmed-scaled reefgoby)
- Priolepis melanops Bogorodsky, T. Suzuki & A. O. Mal, 2016 (Black-faced reefgoby)
- Priolepis nocturna (J. L. B. Smith, 1957) (Black-barred reefgoby)
- Priolepis nuchifasciata (Günther, 1873) (Orange reefgoby)
- Priolepis pallidicincta R. Winterbottom & M. E. Burridge, 1993 (Pale-barred reefgoby)
- Priolepis profunda (M. C. W. Weber, 1909) (Narrow-bar reefgoby)
- Priolepis psygmophilia R. Winterbottom & M. E. Burridge, 1993 (Latticed reefgoby)
- Priolepis randalli R. Winterbottom & M. E. Burridge, 1992 (Randall's reefgoby)
- Priolepis robinsi Garzón-Ferreira & Acero P, 1991
- Priolepis semidoliata (Valenciennes, 1837) (Half-barred reefgoby)
- Priolepis squamogena R. Winterbottom & M. E. Burridge, 1989 (Scaled-cheek reefgoby)
- Priolepis sticta R. Winterbottom & M. E. Burridge, 1992 (Dappled reefgoby)
- Priolepis triops R. Winterbottom & M. E. Burridge, 1993
- Priolepis vexilla R. Winterbottom & M. E. Burridge, 1993 (Ribbon reefgoby)
- Priolepis winterbottomi Nogawa & Endo, 2007
- Priolepis zebra (Randall, 1994)
