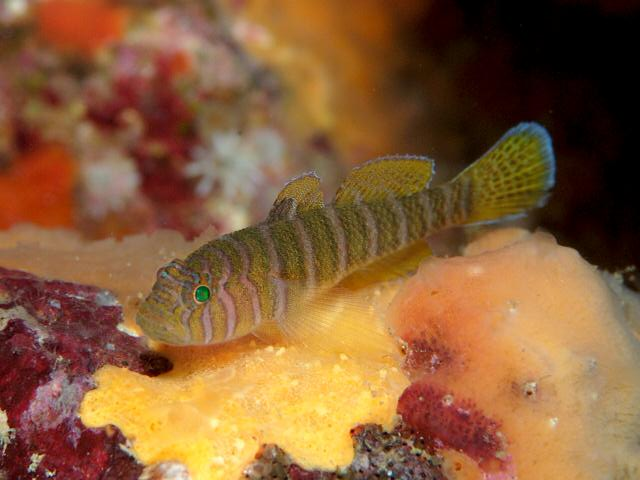

Scientific classification
- Kingdom: Animalia
- Phylum: Chordata
- Class: Actinopterygii
- Order: Gobiiformes
- Family: Gobiidae
- Genus: Priolepis
- Species: P. cincta

Binomial name
- Priolepis cincta (Regan, 1908)

Synonyms
- Gobiomorphus cinctus Regan, 1908; Quisquilius cinctus (Regan, 1908); Amblygobius naraharae Snyder, 1908; Priolepis naraharae (Snyder, 1908); Zonogobius naraharae (Snyder, 1908); Pleurogobius boulengeri Seale, 1910; Cingulogobius boulengeri (Seale, 1910)

= Priolepis cincta =

Species of fish

Priolepis cincta, commonly known as the girdled goby, is a species of goby fish described by Regan in 1908.

== Distribution ==
Its distributional range extends from the Red Sea to Tonga, then from Japan to the Great Barrier Reef. It can be found in brackish water and salt water, with a depth range of 1 – 70 metres (3 ft - 229 ft), although it is usually seen at depths of 1 – 30 metres (3 ft - 98 ft).

== Behaviour ==
The fish is a benthic spawner. They tend to hide in caves and crevices, and can also be found in corals. It is a monogamous fish and are an average length of 7 centimetres. The species is used in aquarium commercial use by humans.

== Etymology ==
The name Priolepis is combined from two words from the Greek Language: prio is translated as "to saw" while lepis means "scale". cincta derives from the Latin word cinctum which can translate to either a girdle or bird, which is in reference to its colour pattern.
