= Sti skini =

Sti Skini (The Very Best Of Live Recordings)

Compilation album by Marinella
- Released: October, 2006
- Recorded: Athens, 1971 – 1980
- Genre: World music, Folk, Modern Laika, Éntekhno
- Label: Universal Music Greece, Mercury

Marinella chronology
Ego (The Very Best of EMI Years) (2005)	Sti Skini (The Very Best Of Live Recordings) (2006)	Ta Logia Ine Peritta – 50 Chronia Tragoudi (2006)

Sti skini (Greek: Στη σκηνή; English: On stage) is a live compilation album by Greek singer Marinella. It contains older live recordings by Marinella from 1971 – 1980 and it was released in October, 2006 in Greece by Universal Music Greece.

== Track listing ==
=== Disc 1 ===
1. "Piretos" – (Akis Panou) – (Greek: Πυρετός; English: Fever)
2. "Simvivazomaste" – (Giorgos Hadjinasios-Tasos Ikonomou) – (Greek: Συμβιβαζόμαστε; English: We're compromising)
3. "Enan kero" – (Christos Leontis-Sotia Tsotou) – (Greek: Έναν καιρό; English: One time)
4. "23 Aprilides" – (Nakis Petridis-Sevi Tiliakou) – (Greek: 23 Απρίληδες; English: 23 Aprils)
5. "Ki' ego de milisa" – (Nakis Petridis-Sevi Tiliakou) – (Greek: Κι' εγώ δε μίλησα; English: And I spoke not)
6. "Nichtoperpatimata" – (Giorgos Hadjinasios-Tasos Ikonomou) – (Greek: Νυχτοπερπατήματα; English: Nightlife)
7. "Akouste" – (Giorgos Katsaros-Pythagoras) – (Greek: Ακούστε; English: Harken)
8. "Oute matia dakrismena" – (Giorgos Katsaros-Pythagoras) – (Greek: Ούτε μάτια δακρυσμένα; English: Eyes without tears)
9. "Pot pourri" – (Greek: Ποτ πουρί; English: Medley)
  1. "Piso apo tis kalamies (Instrumental intro)" – (Giorgos Katsaros-Pythagoras) – (Greek: Πίσω από τις καλαμιές; English: Behind the reeds)
  2. "Pali tha klapso" – (Nakis Petridis-Sevi Tiliakou) – (Greek: Πάλι θα κλάψω; English: Again, I will cry)
  3. "Apopse se thelo" – (Mimis Plessas-Lefteris Papadopoulos) – (Greek: Απόψε σε θέλω; English: Tonight I want you)
  4. "Ama dite to feggari" – (Mimis Plessas-Lefteris Papadopoulos) – (Greek: Άμα δείτε το φεγγάρι; English: Should you see the moon)
  5. "Ti na ftei" – (Giorgos Zambetas-Dimitris Christodoulou) – (Greek: Τι να φταίει; English: What is wrong)
  6. "Apopse chano mia psychi" – (Giorgos Katsaros-Pythagoras) – (Greek: Απόψε χάνω μια ψυχή; English: Tonight I'm losing a soul)
  7. "I antres den klene" – (Giorgos Katsaros-Pythagoras) – (Greek: Οι άντρες δεν κλαίνε; English: Men don't cry)
  8. "Anixe petra" – (Mimis Plessas-Lefteris Papadopoulos) – (Greek: Άνοιξε πέτρα; English: Open, stone)
10. "Drigi, drigi mana mou (Velvet mornings)" – (Stélios Vlavianós-Robert Constandinos-Pythagoras) – (Greek: Ντρίγκι, ντρίγκι, μάνα μου; English: Drigi, drigi, my love)
11. "To mantalo" – (Giorgos Katsaros-Pythagoras) – (Greek: Το μάνταλο; English: The latch)
12. "Ti na thimitho, ti na xechaso" – (Apostolos Kaldaras-Pythagoras) – (Greek: Τι να θυμηθώ, τι να ξεχάσω; English: What to remember, what to forget)
13. "Pame gia ypno Katerina" – (Giorgos Katsaros-Pythagoras) – (Greek: Πάμε για ύπνο Κατερίνα; English: Let's go to sleep, Catherine)
14. "An imoun plousios" (in duet with Marios Kostoglou) – (Doros Georgiadis-Sotia Tsotou) – (Greek: Αν ήμουν πλούσιος; English: If I were rich)
15. "Derbenterissa" – (Vassilis Tsitsanis-Nikos Routsos) – (Greek: Ντερμπεντέρισσα; English: Straight talking woman)
16. "De me stefanonese" – (Vassilis Tsitsanis) – (Greek: Δε με στεφανώνεσαι; English: You don't marry me)
17. "De simfonisame" – (Giorgos Zampetas-Alexandros Kagiantas) – (Greek: Δε συμφωνήσαμε; English: We weren't compatible)

=== Disc 2 ===
1. "Nekro mou oniro" – (Kostas Hatzis-Giannis Pavlou) – (Greek: Νεκρό μου όνειρο; English: My dead dream)
2. "Olos o kosmos eis' esy" – (Kostas Hatzis-Sotia Tsotou) – (Greek: Όλος ο κόσμος είσ' εσύ; English: You're the whole world)
3. "S' agapo" – (Kostas Hatzis-Sotia Tsotou) – (Greek: Σ' αγαπώ; English: I love you)
4. "S' aparnithika tris" – (Kostas Hatzis-Sotia Tsotou) – (Greek: Σ' απαρνήθηκα τρις; English: I renounced you thrice)
5. "Ki' ystera" – (Kostas Hatzis-Sotia Tsotou) – (Greek: Κι' ύστερα; English: And afterwards)
6. "Tora pou stegnosan ta dakria mou" – (Kostas Hatzis-Ilias Lymperopoulos) – (Greek: Τώρα που στέγνωσαν τα δάκρυα μου; English: Now that my tears have dried)
7. "Sinora i agapi den gnorizi" – (Kostas Hatzis-Sotia Tsotou) – (Greek: Σύνορα η αγάπη δεν γνωρίζει; English: Love knows no frontier)
8. "Otan to fos tis agapis tha svisei" – (Kostas Hatzis-Sotia Tsotou) – (Greek: Όταν το φως της αγάπης θα σβήσει; English: When the light of love will turn off)
9. "Glyko tis niotis mou pouli" – (Kostas Hatzis-Sotia Tsotou) – (Greek: Γλυκό της νιότης μου πουλί; English: Sweet bird of my youth)
10. "Pare me mazi sou tsiggane" – (Kostas Hatzis-Sotia Tsotou) – (Greek: Πάρε με μαζί σου τσιγγάνε; English: Gypsy man, take me with you)
11. "I agapi ola ta ypomenei" – (Kostas Hatzis-Sotia Tsotou) – (Greek: Η αγάπη όλα τα υπομένει; English: Love withstands all)
12. "Den thelo gramma" – (Kostas Hatzis-Xenofontas Fileris) – (Greek: Δεν θέλω γράμμα; English: I don't want letter)
13. "I palies kales meres" – (Kostas Hatzis-Giorgos Ikonomidis) – (Greek: Οι παλιές καλές μέρες; English: The good old days)
14. "Ton echasa" – (Kostas Hatzis-Sotia Tsotou) – (Greek: Τον έχασα; English: I lost him)
15. "Esy pou xeris" – (Kostas Hatzis-Xenofontas Fileris) – (Greek: Εσύ που ξέρεις; English: You who know)
16. "Ah, pos me kitas" – (Kostas Hatzis-Xenofontas Fileris) – (Greek: Αχ, πώς με κοιτάς; English: Oh, how you look at me)
17. "Mi zitas" – (Kostas Hatzis-Giorgos Ikonomidis) – (Greek: Μη ζητάς; English: Don't ask)
18. "Mes sto iliovasilema" – (Kostas Hatzis-Sotia Tsotou) – (Greek: Μες στο ηλιοβασίλεμα; English: In the sunset)
19. "Giati" – (Kostas Hatzis-Sotia Tsotou) – (Greek: Γιατί; English: Why)
20. "An tragoudousan ta tragoudia" – (Kostas Hatzis-Giorgos Ikonomidis) – (Greek: Αν τραγουδούσαν τα τραγούδια; English: If songs could sing)
21. "Pare ena kochili ap' to Aegeo" (in duet with Kostas Hatzis) – (Kostas Hatzis-Xenofontas Fileris) – (Greek: Πάρε ένα κοχύλι απ' το Αιγαίο; English: Get a sea-shell from Aegean Sea)

== Personnel ==
- Marinella – vocals
- Marios Kostoglou – vocals and background vocals on tracks 3 – 8, 10 – 14 and 16 (on Disc 01)
- Kostas Hatzis – vocals, background vocals and arranger (on Disc 02)
- Yiannis Smyrneos – recording engineer
- Tasos Vrettos – photographer
- Achilleas Haritos – make-up artist
