= Tolmo =

Studio album by Marinella
- Released: December 1988
- Recorded: Athens, studio Polysound, 1988
- Genre: World music; folk; pop
- Length: 34:11
- Language: Greek
- Label: Minos EMI
- Producer: Achilleas Theofilou

Marinella chronology
Marinella & Kostas Hatzis – Synantisi (1987)	Tolmo (1988)	Ise Mia Thiella (1989)

Tolmo (Greek: Τολμώ; I dare) is the name of a studio album by Greek singer Marinella. It was released in December 1988 by Minos EMI in Greece and it went gold selling over 50,000 units.

The original release was in stereo on vinyl and cassette. The album was released on CD in January 1989 and was re-released in 1994. On 1 October 2002 was re-issued on a CD compilation album, together with the 1989 album Ise Mia Thiella by Minos EMI, under the label of Capitol Records.

== Track listing ==
Side One

1. "Tolmo" (Τολμώ; I dare) – (Alexis Papadimitriou – Evi Droutsa) – 3:02
2. "Ah ke na ginomoun i agapi sou" (Αχ και να γινόμουν η αγάπη σου; If only I became your love) – (Giorgos Niarchos – Argiro Sofou) – 2:43
3. "Koursa thanatou" in duet with Yiannis Parios (Κούρσα θανάτου; Race of death) – (Alexis Papadimitriou – Evi Droutsa) – 3:05
4. "Emis teriazoume" (Εμείς ταιριάζουμε; We suit each other) – (Giorgos Niarchos – Thanos Sofos) – 2:59
5. "Tha kerdiso i tha chaso" (Θα κερδίσω ή θα χάσω; I'll win or I'll lose) – (Nikos Ignatiadis – Evi Droutsa) – 3:25
6. "Ke ta lipa" (Και τα λοιπά; Et cetera) – (Alexis Papadimitriou – Evi Droutsa) – 3:01

Side Two

1. "Na m' agapas (Love Theme from St. Elmo's Fire)" (Να μ' αγαπάς; Love me) in duet with Yiannis Parios – (David Foster – Yiannis Parios) – 3:08
2. "Thelo na ziso" (Θέλω να ζήσω; I want to live) – (Giorgos Niarchos – Thanos Sofos – Napoleon Eleftheriou) – 2:57
3. "Paradigmatos charin" (Παραδείγματος χάριν; For example) – (Alexis Papadimitriou – Evi Droutsa) – 2:43
4. "Agapi" (Αγάπη; Love) – (Giorgos Niarchos – Thanos Sofos) – 2:46
5. "Den iparchi “Den mporo"" (Δεν υπάρχει «Δεν μπορώ»; There's no such thing as “I can't") – (Alexis Papadimitriou – Evi Droutsa) – 2:44
6. "Poso s' agapo" (Πόσο σ' αγαπώ; How much I love you) feat. Yiannis Parios – (Nikos Lavranos – Yiannis Parios) – 3:38

== Personnel ==
- Marinella – vocals, background vocals
- Yiannis Parios – vocals, background vocals
- Katerina Adamantidou, Litsa Giagousi, Stelios Goulielmos – background vocals
- Achilleas Theofilou – producer
- Haris Andreadis – arranger, conductor
- Alexis Papadimitriou – arranger on "Den iparchi “Den mporo""
- Yiannis Smyrneos – recording engineer
- Dinos Diamantopoulos – photographer
