= Priolepis robinsi =

Conservation status
- Least Concern (IUCN 3.1)

Scientific classification
- Kingdom: Animalia
- Phylum: Chordata
- Class: Actinopterygii
- Order: Gobiiformes
- Family: Gobiidae
- Genus: Priolepis
- Species: P. robinsi

Binomial name
- Priolepis robinsi Garzón-Ferreira & Acero P., 1991

Species of fish

Priolepis robinsi is a species of goby native to the Atlantic Ocean off of Santa Marta, Colombia.

== Etymology ==
The specific name honours the American ichthyologist C. Richard Robins (1928–2020) who was at the University of Miami where he studied neotropical gobies.
