= Mary Linda =

Greek singer (1935–2026)

Maria Dimitropoulou (Greek: Μαρία Δημητροπούλου; 2/9 November 1935 – 22 July 2026), known by the stage name Mary Linda (Greek: Μαίρη Λίντα), was a Greek singer of folk-pop music.

== Life and career ==
Maria Dimitropoulou (sometimes written Dimitrakopoulou) was born in Pyrgos, Greece on 2 November or 9 November 1935. Her family later settled in Athens. As a child, she began singing and dancing professionally at cabaret shows, adopting the stage name Mary Linda. For a time, she gained the nickname "the Greek Shirley Temple."

Her first professional recording was a 1953 rendition of the Kostas Kapnisis song "Bitter Glass." She became known for her work in the laïko and éntekhno folk-pop genres.

Linda met fellow musician Manolis Chiotis, and the couple married in 1959. They collaborated extensively, performing together frequently until their divorce in 1966. Their songs together included "Perasmenes Mou Agapes," "Iliovasilemata," "Esy Eisai i Aitia pou Ypofero," and "To Teleftaio Potiraki." Alongside Chiotis, Linda also appeared in dozens of Greek films, including O Atsidas, O Filos Mou o Lefterakis, and I Villa ton Orgion. During a long touring stint in North America, the couple performed together for U.S. President Lyndon Johnson at the White House in 1964.

In the years that followed her separation from Chiotis, Linda continued to perform. She also remarried, to Alexandros Theocharis, with whom she had one daughter, Evangelia. However, the relationship became abusive, and she left him, later citing her singing ability and the financial independence it brought her as a strength that allowed her to break free.

In the mid-1990s and early 2000s, Linda collaborated with such female artists as Haris Alexiou and Glykeria. She retired after a final string of nightclub performances in 2011 and 2012 alongside Anna Vissi. Over the course of her career, she produced some 1,200 recordings.

Linda died in Athens on 22 July 2026, at the age of 90. On her death, she was described as "iconic" and "one of the most celebrated voices in Greek popular music for decades."
