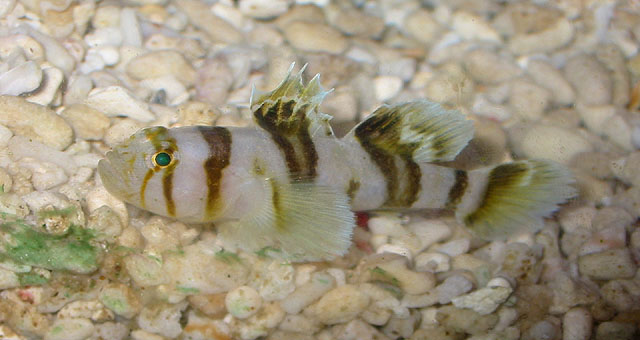

Scientific classification
- Kingdom: Animalia
- Phylum: Chordata
- Class: Actinopterygii
- Order: Gobiiformes
- Family: Gobiidae
- Genus: Priolepis
- Species: P. nocturna

Binomial name
- Priolepis nocturna (J. L. B. Smith, 1957)

Synonyms
- Ctenogobius nocturnus J. L. B. Smith, 1957

= Priolepis nocturna =

Species of fish

Priolepis nocturna, the Blackbarred reefgoby, is a species of goby native to the Indian Ocean and the western Pacific Ocean where it occurs at depths of from 8 to 30 metres (26 to 98 ft) on coral reefs. It inhabits crevices in the reef. This species can reach a length of 3.9 centimetres (1.5 in) SL.
