= Lege Mou "S' agapo" =

Lege Mou "S' agapo”

Studio album by Marinella
- Released: December 1990
- Recorded: Athens, 1990, studio Polysound
- Genre: World music; folk; Modern Laika
- Length: 34:23
- Language: Greek
- Label: Minos EMI
- Producer: Achilleas Theofilou

Marinella chronology
| Eisai Mia Thiella (1989) | Lege Mou "S' agapo” (1990) | Ta Tragoudia Tis Amerikis (1991) |

Lege mou "S' agapo" (Greek: Λέγε μου "Σ' αγαπώ"; Keep telling me "I love you") is a studio album by Greek singer Marinella. It was released in December 1990 in Greece and Cyprus by Minos EMI. All music and lyrics are by Takis Mousafiris. This album was issued in mono and stereo. The stereo version of this album was released on CD in the same year by Minos EMI.

== Track listing ==
Side one.

1. "Thelo na t' akouo (Lege mou “S' agapo")" (Θέλω να τ' ακούω; I want to hear it) – 2:53
2. "Enas filos" (Ένας φίλος; A friend) – 3:54
3. "Den thelo pia na me thimase" (Δεν θέλω πια να με θυμάσαι; I don't want you to remember me anymore) – 2:45
4. "Arki na 'rthis" (Αρκεί να 'ρθεις; It's enough to come) – 3:26
5. "Matia gemata “S' agapo"" (Μάτια γεμάτα “Σ' αγαπώ"; Eyes full of "I love you") – 3:17
6. "I agapi ine polemos" (Η αγάπη είναι πόλεμος; Love is war) – 4:22

Side two.

1. "Ki esy mou les “Den ksero"" (Κι εσύ μου λες “Δεν ξέρω"; And you're telling me "I don't know") – 2:52
2. "Prota ap' ola ego" (Πρώτα απ' όλα εγώ; First of all, myself) – 3:02
3. "Sto gyrou tou thanatou" (Στο γύρου του θανάτου; In the round of death) – 2:56
4. "Thimase" (Θυμάσαι; Do you remember?) feat. Dimitris Kokotas – 3:21
5. "Olo avrio" (Όλο αύριο; Constantly, tomorrow) – 3:35

== Personnel ==
- Marinella – vocals, background vocals
- Dimitris Kokotas, Irene Ragkou, Anna Zisi, Argiris Koukas – background vocals
- Achilleas Theofilou – producer
- Takis Mousafiris – arranger, conductor
- Yiannis Smyrneos – recording engineer
- Dinos Diamantopoulos – photographer
- Achilleas Haritos – make-up artist
- Dimitris Souleles – hair stylist
