= Tipota Den Ginete Tihea =

Studio album by Marinella
- Released: 19 December 2005
- Recorded: Athens, 2005, studio Odeon
- Genre: World music; Folk; Modern Laika; Pop
- Length: 41:29
- Language: Greek
- Label: Universal Music Greece; Mercury
- Producer: Giorgos Theofanous

Marinella chronology
| Ammos Itane (2004) | Tipota Den Ginete Tihea (2005) | Marinella & Antonis Remos – Live (2007) |

Tipota den ginete tihea (Greek: Τίποτα δεν γίνεται τυχαία; English: Nothing is random) is the name of the last studio album by Greek singer Marinella. All music and lyrics are by Giorgos Theofanous. It was released on 19 December 2005 by Universal Music in Greece and it went gold, selling over 20,000 units.

== Track listing ==
1. "Anapse fota" (Άναψε φώτα; Turn on the lights) – 4:32
2. "Xypna" (Ξύπνα; Wake up) – 3:47
3. "Tipota den ginete tichea" (Τίποτα δεν γίνεται τυχαία; Νothing is random) – 3:45
4. "Aftos to xeri" (Αυτός το ξέρει; He knows it) – 4:28
5. "Etsi ine i agapi" (Έτσι είναι η αγάπη; Thus it is the love) in duet with Antonis Remos – 4:05
6. "Ti thelis tora" (Τι θέλεις τώρα; What you want now?) – 4:29
7. "Pios tha mou pei to “S' agapo”" (Ποιος θα μου πει το “Σ' αγαπώ”; Who will tell me “I love you”?) in duet with Glykeria – 4:09
8. "Echo mathei" (Έχω μάθει; I have learned) with Spyros Lamprou Children's Choir – 4:32
9. "Panta kati mas lipi" (Πάντα κάτι μας λείπει; Always something's missing) in duet with Kostas Makedonas – 4:19
10. "Tis monaxias" (Της μοναξιάς; Of loneliness) – 3:38
11. "Klise ta fota" (Κλείσε τα φώτα; Τurn off the lights) – 1:45

== Music videos ==
- "Aftos to xeri" - Director: Giorgos Gavalos
- "Ti thelis tora" - Director: Giorgos Gavalos

== Personnel ==
- Marinella - vocals, background vocals
- Glykeria - vocals
- Antonis Remos - vocals
- Kostas Makedonas - vocals
- Children Choir of Spyros Lamprou - background vocals
- Giorgos Theofanous - producer, arranger, conductor
- Yiannis Smyrneos - recording engineer
- Tasos Vrettos - photographer
- Achilleas Haritos - make-up artist
- Dimitris Rekouniotis - artwork
