= I Prova Tou Nifikou =

Soundtrack album by Marinella
- Released: November 1995
- Recorded: Athens 1995, studio Polysound
- Genre: World music, Folk, Blues, Jazz
- Length: 56:12
- Language: Greek
- Label: Minos/EMI
- Producer: Minos EMI

Marinella chronology
To Ximeroma Tou Erota (1993)	I Prova Tou Nifikou (1995)	I Marinella Tragouda Giorgo Zampeta & Aki Panou (1996)

I prova tou nifikou (Greek: Η πρόβα του νυφικού; English: Fitting of the wedding dress) is a Greek album by composer Vassilis Dimitriou with singers Marinella and Pemi Zouni, which was also the soundtrack of the same titled popular Greek TV series that aired on ANT1 from October 6, 1995 on Fridays, directed by Kostas Koutsomytis and created by Vaggelis Goufas, based on the novel of the same name written by Ntora Giannakopoulou. It was released in November 1995 by Minos EMI in Greece and Cyprus. All music and lyrics are by Vassilis Dimitriou.

This album was issued in mono and stereo. The stereo version of this album was released on CD at the same time, with two bonus tracks by Minos EMI.

== Track listing ==
Side one.

1. "Prova nifikou" (Πρόβα νυφικού; Fitting of the wedding dress) – 4:02
2. "Gia ta matia sou" (Για τα μάτια σου; For your eyes) – 5:32
3. "Treli" (Τρελή; Crazy) – 3:33
4. "S' ena fondo lefko" (Σ' ένα φόντο λευκό; In a white background) – 2:57
5. "Mesa s' ena tango" (Μέσα σ' ένα τανγκό; In a tango) – 4:25

Side two.

1. "Pou pas kai chanese" (Πού πας και χάνεσαι; Where you go and vanish) – 3:06
2. "M' ena blues" (Μ' ένα μπλουζ; With a blues) – 4:08
3. "I nichta na 'chi trela" (Η νύχτα να 'χει τρέλα; The night should have folly) – 2:48
4. "Panta kati simveni" (Πάντα κάτι συμβαίνει; Always something happens) – 4:50
5. "Café Santan (Instrumental)" (Καφέ Σαντάν) – 4:43
6. "To tango tis Matinas" (Το τανγκό της Ματίνας; Matina's tango) – 2:58

Bonus track on the CD re-issue.

1. "Ta koritsia tis nichtas (Instrumental)" (Τα κορίτσια της νύχτας; The night girls) – 5:05
2. "Erotiko se tria meri (Instrumental)" (Ερωτικό σε τρία μέρη; Love theme in three parts) – 8:05

== Personnel ==
- Marinella - vocals and background vocals on tracks 1, 3, 4, 5, 6, 7 and 9
- Pemi Zouni - vocals on tracks 2, 8 and 10
- Maria Charouha, Alina Kotsovoulou, Cristina Guglielmino - background vocals on track "I nichta na 'chi trela"
- Minos EMI - producer
- Vassilis Dimitriou - arranger, conductor
- Alkistis Spilioti - artwork
