= Ise Mia Thiella =

Studio album by Marinella
- Released: December 1989 (Greece)
- Recorded: Athens, 1989
- Genre: World music; folk; pop
- Length: 29:55
- Language: Greek
- Label: Minos EMI
- Producer: Achilleas Theofilou

Marinella chronology
| Tolmo (1988) | Ise Mia Thiella (1989) | Lege Mou "S' agapo" (1990) |

Ise Mia Thiella (Greek: Είσαι μια θύελλα; You're a storm) is a studio album by Greek singer Marinella. It was released in December 1989 by Minos EMI in Greece and it went gold selling over 40,000 units.

This album was issued in mono and stereo. The stereo version of this album was released on CD in the same year. On 1 October 2002 it was re-issued on a CD compilation album, together with the 1988 album Tolmo by Capitol Records/Minos EMI.

== Track listing ==
Side one.

1. "Ise mia thiella" (Είσαι μια θύελλα; You're a storm) – (Alexis Papadimitriou – Evi Droutsa) – 3:24
2. "Se yirevo pantou" (Σε γυρεύω παντού; I'm looking for you everywhere) – (Giorgos Niarchos – Thanos Sofos) – 2:45
3. "Ego to simera zo" (Εγώ το σήμερα ζω; I live in today) – (Giorgos Niarchos – Argiro Sofou) – 2:55
4. "Gi' afto m' aresis" (Γι' αυτό μ' αρέσεις; That's why I like you) – (Alexis Papadimitriou – Evi Droutsa) – 3:11
5. "Kita symptosi" (Κοίτα σύμπτωση; Look, what a coincidence) – (Alexis Papadimitriou – Evi Droutsa) – 3:24

Side two.

1. "Ela ke taxidepse me" (Έλα και ταξίδεψέ με; Come and travel me) – (Giorgos Niarchos – Thanos Sofos – Napoleon Eleftheriou) – 3:32
2. "Prepi na fygo" (Πρέπει να φύγω; I must leave) – (Yiannis Parios) – 2:47
3. "Kouventes ligaki melo" (Κουβέντες λιγάκι μελό; Talks a little melodrama) – (Alexis Papadimitriou – Evi Droutsa) – 3:33
4. "Lege mou psemata" (Λέγε μου ψέματα; Tell me lies) – (Giorgos Niarchos – Thanos Sofos) – 3:27
5. "Mia epanalipsi" (Μια επανάληψη; A repeat) – (Alexis Papadimitriou – Evi Droutsa) – 2:57

== Personnel ==
- Marinella – vocals, background vocals
- Achilleas Theofilou – producer
- Haris Andreadis – arranger, conductor
- Dinos Diamantopoulos – photographer
- Achilleas Haritos – make-up artist
- Dimitris Souleles – hair stylist
