= Kostas Spiropoulos =

Greek painter and doctor

- Born: 28 August 1952 (age 74); Patras, Greece
- Education: University of Athens
- Known for: Painting, Pop art
- Scientific career
- Fields: Painting, Sculpture, Pulmonary Medicine
- Workplaces: University of Patras, University of Ioannina

Kostas Spiropoulos (Greek: Κώστας Σπυρόπουλος; born 28 August 1952) is a Greek painter and doctor. Since the 2000s he has become a leading figure in the pop art movement in Greece. He is Professor Emeritus of Respiratory Medicine in University of Patras.

== Early years ==
Professor and artist Kostas Spiropoulos was born and raised in Patras. Since his childhood he admired the famous painters and scientists, because their common characteristic is the lust for constant amelioration of the spirit and the soul, as they eternally seek for the decryption of the world.

In his early artistic steps, he studied the works of the greatest teachers of art, Michelangelo and Leonardo da Vinci. He was also keen on Byzantine art and was helping his teacher and byzantine iconographer in the production of paintings in churches in the city of Patras. He was indulged in byzantine art as it remains the container of the values and virtues of Ancient Greece that were later passed on to the Byzantine Empire.

He was given the title of Professor Emeritus in University of Patras after completing his Academic career. He is also Visiting Professor at University of Cyprus and Honorary doctor of Humanities at Nicosia University. Since 2023 he has become a regular member of Tiberina Academy in Rome.

== Scientific career ==
Apart from his love for art and painting, he also wanted to become a doctor, so he studied medicine at the University of Athens. He finished his specialty training in 1982 in Athens Chest Hospital "Sotiria" and in the Department of Internal Medicine of the Navy Hospital in Athens. He completed his PhD thesis in the Department of Medicine, University of Athens. He worked at the Department of Pulmonary Medicine in Riley Hospital for Children Indiana, US. He was also a visiting professor at the Indiana University School of Medicine, USA. He worked as an associate in Brompton Hospital and the London Chest Hospital in London.

In 1990 he was elected as Assistant professor of Respiratory medicine in the Department of Medicine, University of Patras. He became Professor of Respiratory medicine in 2005 and director of the Department of Pulmonary Medicine of the University Hospital of Patras. He is a member of the Hellenic Thoracic Society and European Respiratory Society (ERS). His main research interests include sleep disorders, lung cancer, asthma and chronic obstructive pulmonary disease.

He was given the title of Professor Emeritus in University of Patras after completing his Academic career. He is also Visiting Professor at University of Cyprus and Honorary doctor of Humanities at Nicosia University. Since 2023 he has become a regular member of Tiberina Academy in Rome.

== Painting career ==
After completing his medical studies at the University of Athens, Kostas Spiropoulos traveled to the United States, where he studied art at Heron Art Institute alongside Peter Richardson, who was a pop-art painter. He has participated in individual and group exhibitions in galleries in Greece and Europe, in international art fairs and biennales in Europe and North America. He was teaching human anatomy for artists for eight years as an associate professor of fine arts in the School of Fine Arts in University of Ioannina, and he wrote a book on the subject. He has published books dealing with the art of painting. One of the most important was presented in Katsigra Museum in Larissa, Greece.

== Exhibitions ==
Kostas Spiropoulos has participated in more than 40 individual exhibitions and 45 group exhibitions in Greece and in other European countries, including Italy (Venice, Florence, Piacenza, Verona, Brindisi, Azzolo, Palermo, San Marino), Austria (Innsbruck), Bulgaria (Sofia), France (Paris, Le Louvre), Turkey (Istanbul), Belgium (Brussels), Czech Republic (Praha, Plzen), Azerbaijan (Kabala), Cyprus (Limassol) and in Serbia. He has also exhibited his work in the USA (Los Angeles) and in Canada (Vancouver). A notable moment is his exhibition in Museum Michalis Kakoyiannis in Athens in 2011.

He has participated in International Artfairs: Turkey (Istanbul 2005, 2009), Czech Republic (Praha 2005), Austria (Innsbruck 2009), Greece (Athens 2010), Italy (Florence 2006, Verona 2013, Piacenza 2016), Azerbaijan (Kabala 2015), France (Paris 2016), Canada (Vancouver 2016). He has demonstrated his work in Internatioan Biennales: Czech Republic (Plzen 2006, 2008), Italy (Azzolo 2010, Palermo 2013), China (Beijing 2017) and he has received award in two of these. He has also participated in Swiss Art Expo Zurich in 2021 and 2022.

Paintings of the artist Kostas Spiropoulos can now be found in the National Gallery of Athens, Syros Gallery, Gallery of Piraeus, Museum of the City of Athens, Archaeological Museum of Thessaloniki and in the Mayor House of Florence.

Two large sculptures of Kostas Spiropoulos decorate the courtyard of the Rectorate and the main street of the University Campus of Patras University.

His portrait has been presented by the Italian Academy for Fine Arts in the Special Issue Rembrandt in 2016, commemorative of the 410 years from the birth of Rembrandt (1606-2016) as one of the most important representatives of Modern European painting.

== Recognition ==
His work has been reported and referenced by important Greek and foreign painters and art historians, including Alekos Fasianos, Chrisanthos Xhristou (Academic and art historian), Stelios Lidakis (Professor of history of art), Barbara Angiolini (Art historian), Salvatore Autovino (Professor of history of art), George Pantis (Professor of Fine Arts of University of Ioannina), George Katsaggelos (Professor of Fine Arts of University of Ioannina), Nick Zias (Professor of history of art), Roberto Chiavarini (Member of the Italian Academy of Fine arts), Polixeni Veleni (Director of the Archeological Museum of Thessaloniki), Aglaia Archontidou (Director of the Museum of the City of Athens), Antigoni Kapsali (Art historian, Museum Katsigra).

His paintings are exhibited in museums in Greece and in other European countries, such as the National Gallery in Athens, Theocharakis Foundation, Archaeological museum of Thessaloniki, Archaeological museum of Patras, Michael Cacoyannis Foundation, Museum of the City of Athens, Town Hall of Florence and in private galleries in Greece and abroad.

Spiropoulos received an award of Honorary Doctor of Arts and Humanities in the University of Nicosia in 2023. His speech in the respective ceremony was illustrative of his vision on art and science.

== Scientific and other publications ==
Kostas Spiropoulos has published books for medical students and doctors in the field of Respiratory medicine, including an atlas of anatomy of the respiratory system and books on physiology and respiratory function testing. He has published books demonstarting his artistic presence. Lately, as a scholar, he has also contributed actively to the philosophical literature on the arts and humanities.
