= To Ximeroma Tou Erota =

Studio album by Marinella
- Released: 1993
- Recorded: Athens, 1993, studio Polysound
- Genre: World music; folk; Modern Laika
- Length: 43:33
- Language: Greek
- Label: Minos EMI
- Producer: Minos EMI

Marinella chronology
| I Marinella Tragouda Megales Kyries (1992) | To Ximeroma Tou Erota (1993) | I Prova Tou Nifikou (1995) |

To ximeroma tou erota (Greek: Το ξημέρωμα του έρωτα; The dawn of love) is a studio album by Greek singer Marinella. It was released in 1993 by Minos EMI in Greece. This album was issued in mono and stereo. The stereo version of this album was released on CD in the same year.

== Track listing ==
Side one.

1. "Anatolika tis dysis" (Ανατολικά της δύσης) – (Thanasis Polykandriotis – Ifigeneia Giannopoulou) – 3:53
2. "To ximeroma tou erota" (Το ξημέρωμα του έρωτα) – (Thanasis Polykandriotis – Ifigeneia Giannopoulou) – 3:37
3. "Tris i ora" (Τρεις η ώρα) – (Thanasis Polykandriotis – Ifigeneia Giannopoulou) – 3:18
4. "Olos o kosmos kegiete" (Όλος ο κόσμος καίγεται) – (Thanasis Polykandriotis – Ifigeneia Giannopoulou) – 3:11
5. "Rodo ki agkathi" (Ρόδο κι αγκάθι) – (Thanasis Polykandriotis – Ifigeneia Giannopoulou) – 4:04
6. "Anasa sto avrio" (Ανάσα στο αύριο) – (Thanasis Polykandriotis – Ifigeneia Giannopoulou) – 3:06
7. "Ti ekana gia parti mou" (Τι έκανα για πάρτη μου) – (Thanasis Polykandriotis – Fotini Dourou) – 3:18

Side two.

1. "M' enan erota echtro" (Μ' έναν έρωτα εχθρό) – (Christos Nikolopoulos – Ifigeneia Giannopoulou) – 4:02
2. "Gia na niosis san Theos" (Για να νιώσεις σαν Θεός) – (Christos Nikolopoulos – Ifigeneia Giannopoulou) – 3:53
3. "Ego" (Εγώ) – (Christos Nikolopoulos – Ifigeneia Giannopoulou) – 3:02
4. "O,ti zo meta apo 'sena" (Ό,τι ζω μετά από 'σένα) – (Christos Nikolopoulos – Ifigeneia Giannopoulou) – 3:05
5. "Pseftiko stoma" (Ψεύτικο στόμα) – (Christos Nikolopoulos – Ifigeneia Giannopoulou) – 3:27
6. "Matia anatolis" (Μάτια ανατολής) – (Christos Nikolopoulos – Ifigeneia Giannopoulou) – 2:57

== Personnel ==
- Marinella – vocals
- Argyris Koukas – background vocals on tracks 4, 7 and 12
- Stelios Goulielmos, Eva Tselidou, Sandy Politi – background vocals
- Haris Andreadis – arranger, conductor
- Minos EMI – producer
- Philippos Papatheodorou – art direction
- Yiannis Smyrneos – recording engineer
- Dinos Diamantopoulos – photographer
- Dimitris Souleles – hair stylist
