= Priolepis zebra =

Conservation status
- Least Concern (IUCN 3.1)

Scientific classification
- Kingdom: Animalia
- Phylum: Chordata
- Class: Actinopterygii
- Order: Gobiiformes
- Family: Gobiidae
- Genus: Priolepis
- Species: P. zebra

Binomial name
- Priolepis zebra (J. E. Randall, 1994)

Species of fish

Priolepis zebra is a species of goby native to the Arabian Sea off the coast of Oman where it is found at a depth of about 21 metres (69 ft) inhabiting open waters near small cracks and holes available for refuge. This species grows to a length of 3.4 centimetres (1.3 in) SL. This species was first described as the only member of genus Ego.
