= Manolis Chiotis =

Manolis Chiotis Μανώλης Χιώτης

Background information
- Born: 21 March 1921; Stavroupoli, Kingdom of Greece
- Died: 20 March 1970 (aged 48) Athens, Kingdom of Greece
- Genres: Rebetiko, laïko
- Occupations: Composer, singer, bouzouki player
- Instruments: Bouzouki, guitar, vocals
- Years active: 1938–1970
- Spouse: Mary Linda (m. 1958; div. 1967)

Manolis Chiotis (Greek: Μανώλης Χιώτης; 21 March 1921 – 20 March 1970) was a Greek composer, singer and bouzouki virtuoso who played a decisive role in the transition from rebetiko to post-war laïko music. He is widely regarded as one of the most influential figures in 20th-century Greek popular music and is generally credited with introducing and popularising the four-course bouzouki in the mid-1950s, a development that reshaped the technique, sound and social status of the instrument in modern Greek music.

== Early life and musical beginnings ==
Chiotis was born on 21 March 1921 in the Stavroupoli suburb of Thessaloniki and grew up in Nafplio. According to later scholarship, he received training in both rebetiko and Western music from an early age and showed unusual musical ability as a child. By the late 1930s he had moved into the Athenian music scene. He first worked as a guitarist, then turned decisively to the bouzouki, and entered the recording industry in 1938 after signing with Columbia.

His first known recordings as a composer date from 1938, when he recorded the songs Kainourgia niotho ti zoi and Palia mou agapi in collaboration with Stephanos Spitambelos and singer Athanasios Evgenikos. He became more widely known in 1940 with Giati de les to nai ki esy (better known by its opening line To chrima den to logariazo), one of the songs that established him as an important new presence in pre-war Greek popular music.

== Post-war rise and the transition from rebetiko to laïko ==
From the mid-1940s onward, Chiotis emerged as one of the central figures in the modernization of bouzouki music. Scholarship on post-war Greek popular music has identified him as a leading force in the “ennoblement” and broad social dissemination of rebetiko-laïko, especially through his effort to carry bouzouki music into middle-class and bourgeois entertainment spaces.

He began to fuse rebetiko idioms with jazz, Latin and other international popular styles, collaborated with musicians and lyricists from the lighter urban song tradition, and helped shape the more cosmopolitan current often associated with archontorebetiko. He also performed in some of the first high-profile nightclubs to feature laïko music in post-war Athens, contributing to the movement of the bouzouki from marginal and subcultural settings into mainstream urban nightlife.

During the 1940s and 1950s he wrote and performed in a wide range of popular styles and worked with many leading singers of the period, including Takis Binis, Stella Haskil, Stelios Kazantzidis and Keti Grey.

== Musical innovations ==
One of Chiotis's most consequential innovations was the introduction, from the mid-1950s, of the four-course bouzouki. The instrument soon became dominant and altered the sound and harmonic structure of laïko music over the following decades. The four-course instrument, together with Chiotis's more guitar-oriented harmonic language and virtuosic technique, expanded the bouzouki's chordal and melodic possibilities and enabled a more technically demanding style of performance.

Chiotis was also among the first major bouzouki players to adopt electric amplification. Later scholarship has treated the amplified sound as central to his musical identity and to the wider acceptance of the bouzouki in larger venues, on records and in mass entertainment.

== Mary Linda, cinema and celebrity ==
Chiotis's career reached a commercial peak between 1958 and 1965, when he formed a famous duet with the singer Mary Linda, whom he married in 1958. Together they recorded many of his best-known hits, often in jazz- and Latin-inflected idioms, and became one of the defining acts of cosmopolitan post-war laïko.

In 1964, during a tour of the United States, Chiotis and Linda performed at the White House in honor of President Lyndon B. Johnson.

The pair also appeared prominently in Greek cinema and in nightclub entertainment. Chiotis appeared in multiple Finos Film productions, and the Chiotis–Linda partnership became strongly associated with the visual culture of popular Greek entertainment in the 1960s. More broadly, Chiotis became a favored figure of state radio and commercial cinema at a moment when bouzouki music was becoming increasingly visible across all social classes and in Greece's international cultural image.

== Collaborations with other composers ==
Beyond his own songs, Chiotis was also a highly sought-after soloist and collaborator. A notable example was his close collaboration with Mikis Theodorakis between 1960 and 1962. His bouzouki playing was central to the 1960 Columbia recording of Theodorakis's Epitaphios with Grigoris Bithikotsis, a recording widely regarded as a landmark in modern Greek music.

== Later years and death ==
Chiotis spent much of the mid-1960s in the United States with Mary Linda. According to later accounts, he returned to Greece around the spring of 1968, by which point the Greek popular-music landscape had changed substantially. His last years were marked by artistic uncertainty and growing health problems.

Chiotis died of heart failure at "Ippokrateio" General Hospital of Athens on 20 March 1970, at age 48.

== Legacy ==
Chiotis is widely regarded as one of the most important reformers of 20th-century Greek popular music. His fusion of rebetiko with jazz, Latin and other international elements, his redesign of the bouzouki's technical possibilities, and his use of amplified sound helped define the sound of post-war laïko.

Later scholarship has emphasized not only his instrumental virtuosity but also his role in changing the public meaning of the bouzouki. Through his performances, recordings, stage presentation, nightclub aesthetics, radio presence and film appearances, he helped move the instrument from the social margins into the center of Greek public culture. The dominance of the four-course bouzouki in modern performance practice remains one of the clearest markers of his long-term influence on Greek music.

== Selected songs and recordings ==
The following songs and recordings are among the best known or most historically representative in Chiotis's career, though the list is not exhaustive:

- Kenourgia niotho ti zoi (1938), with Athanasios Evgenikos; one of his first known recordings as a composer.
- Palia mou agapi (1938), with Athanasios Evgenikos; recorded in the same first Columbia session as Kenourgia niotho ti zoi.
- Giati de les to ne ki esy / To chrima den to logariazo (1940), sung by Stratos Pagioumtzis; the song that brought him wider recognition before the Second World War.
- Partides (1950), recorded with Stella Haskil and Takis Binis.
- Ego tha ta pliroso (1958), recorded by Chiotis and Mary Linda during their American recording period.
- Esy den ise anthropos (1958), associated both with a Panos Gavalas recording and with a contemporary Mary Linda/Chiotis version.
- Dikeologies (1960), with lyrics by Eftychia Papagianopoulou, recorded by Chiotis and Mary Linda.
- Thessaloniki mou (1961), one of the Chiotis–Linda recordings issued on Columbia extended-play releases and later collected on LP.
