= Epitaphios =

Epitaphios or epitaphius may refer to:

- Epitaphios (liturgical) or epitaphion, a cloth icon used during Holy Week in churches that follow the Byzantine rite
- Funeral oration (ancient Greece) or epitaphios logos
  - Gorgias' text on the same

== See also ==
- Epitafios, an Argentine TV series
