= Marinella =

Greek singer (1938–2026)

Marinella Μαρινέλλα
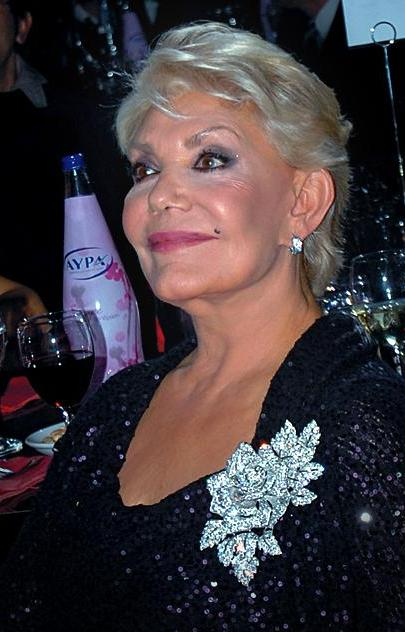
- Marinella in 2008

Background information
- Born: Kyriaki Papadopoulou; 19 May 1938; Thessaloniki, Greece
- Died: 28 March 2026 (aged 87) Kifisia, Greece
- Genres: Folk; laïko; blues; rebetiko
- Occupations: Musician; singer; actress
- Instrument: Vocals
- Years active: 1956–2024
- Labels: PolyGram Greece; Minos EMI; BMG Greece; Universal Music Greece

Kyriaki Papadopoulou (Greek: Κυριακή Παπαδοπούλου; 19 May 1938 – 28 March 2026), known by her stage name Marinella (Greek: Μαρινέλλα), was a Greek folk singer whose career spanned several decades. Marinella was well regarded due to her impressive vocal range. Since the beginning of her professional singing career in 1956, she released 66 solo albums, and was also featured on many albums by other musicians. She represented Greece in the Eurovision Song Contest 1974, marking the country's first entry in the contest.

From 1956 to 2024, Marinella remained active for 68 years, performing in concerts and weekly shows at nightclubs. On 25 September 2024, at the age of 86, she suffered a severe hemorrhagic stroke while performing at the Odeon of Herodes Atticus in Athens, collapsing on stage.

== Early life ==
Kyriaki Papadopoulou was born in the city of Thessaloniki in northern Greece, on 19 May 1938. Her parents were Greek refugees of Pontic origin, but their families before the exchange had settled in Constantinople. She was the fourth and last child of a large family, which despite its poverty, was rich in love and in artistic vein. The whole family gathered around the turntable and sang, while her father tried to teach children the steps of the waltz and the tango. She performed in public from the age of four singing on the radio broadcast on Paidiki Ora (Children's Hour) and later doing ads for shops such as "Melka" in Thessaloniki, earning her first pocket money. She participated in many performances of children's theatre.

At age 15, she gave up her budding career to finish school, but by seventeen, her passion for the theatre returned and she joined the troupe of Marie Laurent and played small roles. One day, the lead singer fell sick and sought out Marinella as a replacement, who was willing to take the singer's place. Marinella then became the lead singer of the troupe. Additionally, she later joined the Military Theatre because the remuneration was better. At the same time she started her career as a singer at the "Panorama" centre of Thessaloniki, where Greek actor and singer Tolis Harmas coined the name "Marinella" for her, inspired by his song.

She released her first song in 1957, "Nitsa, Elenitsa (Little Helen)". Her early career was marked by her collaboration with singer Stelios Kazantzidis. Together they managed to become the greatest duo of Greece, unsurpassed even today. Starting at the night club "Luxembourg" in Thessaloniki where they enjoyed great success, they later moved to Athens, where they became widely known. They sang the songs of Mikis Theodorakis, Manos Hadjidakis, Vassilis Tsitsanis, Giorgos Mitsakis, Giorgos Zambetas, Apostolos Kaldaras, Theodoros Derveniotis, Stavros Xarchakos, and Christos Leontis, who are considered the best composers of their era.

== Early career ==
In October 1970, Marinella participated in the V Festival Internacional da Cançao Popular – Parte Internacion (FIC) in Rio de Janeiro, representing Greece with the song "Kyra Giorgena (Wife of George)", finishing 4th among 38 countries. On 24 October 1970, the Billboard wrote "Marinella from Greece, knows audiences in Athens clubs, carries enchantment in her songs and the warmth of the sun in her voice" (by Henry Johnston).

Marinella was the first Greek singer to participate in the International MIDEM Festival of 1973 in Cannes with three new songs composed by Stavros Xarchakos. She also participated in the Eurovision Song Contest in 1974, placing eleventh with the song "Krasi, thalassa kai t' agori mou" ("Wine, sea and my boyfriend"). Initially Greek rock band Nostradamos had won the first Eurovision participation contest run by the state broadcaster ERT to represent Greece at Eurovision. However the band was not allowed to compete at Eurovision due to a scandal, and Marinella was sent instead.

She also performed in several Greek musicals, both as singer and actress. Her popularity rose in the late 1960s, 1970s, and 1980s, with a string of successful albums and live shows. She developed a new standard for shows in the Greek night clubs, introducing costumes, dancing, and special lighting effects.

== Later career ==
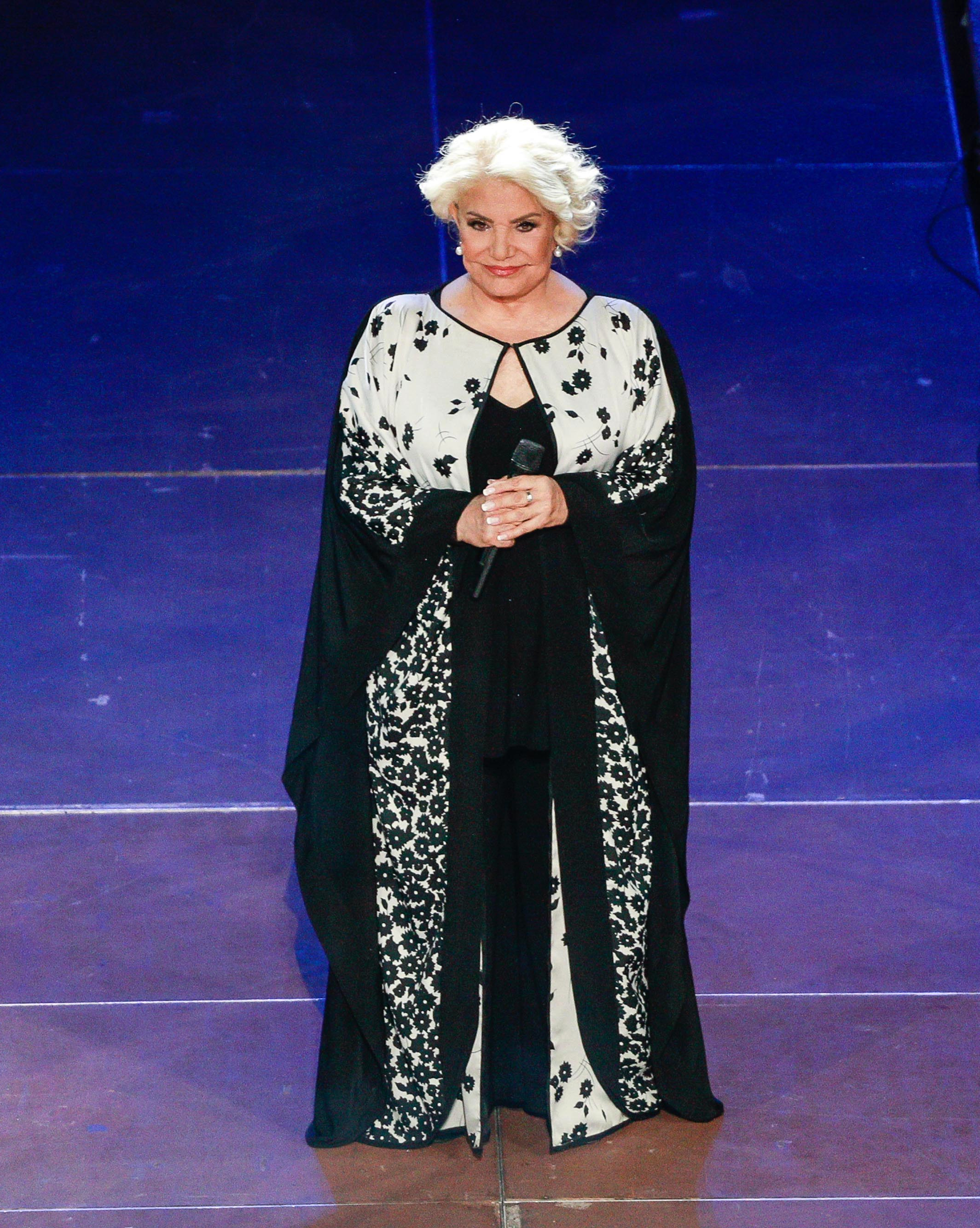
At the Odeon of Herodes Atticus in 2022

On 27 April 1998, Marinella performed in the Athens Concert Hall, performing her older hits to great acclaim. Her concert at the small Olympic Stadium of Athens on 1 October 1999 was a great success with more than 25,000 people in attendance.

In November 2002, she collaborated with George Dalaras. They performed concerts in Athens and Thessaloniki as well as abroad. The tour was titled "Mazi (Together)" and they released a live album from these performances which reached platinum status in 2003.

On 10 April 2003, The New York Times critic Jon Pareles wrote about Marinella: "Her voice was earthy and strong, and she had the presence of an actress as she danced a few teasing steps or brought dignity to longing" .

In March 2004, she released a brand new album with new songs by Nikos Antypas and Lina Nikolakopoulou, entitled "Ammos Itane (Sand it's what it was)". In the same year, on 29 August, she performed at the closing ceremony of the 2004 Summer Olympics, along with Dimitra Galani, Haris Alexiou, Yiannis Parios, and George Dalaras.

In December 2005, she released a new album titled "Tipota Den Ginete Tihea (Νothing happens by chance)", composed by Giorgos Theofanous. The album reached gold status and includes duets with famous Greek singers, such as Antonis Remos and Glykeria.

In 2006, two new compilations of Marinella were officially released, the first titled "Sti Skini (On stage)" and containing older live recordings and the second one titled "Ta Logia Ine Peritta – 50 Chronia Tragoudi (Words are pointless – 50 Years of song)", which is a complete eight CDs boxset with Marinella's greatest hits from the beginning of her career until her collaboration with Kostas Hatzis at "Recital". She then returned to nightlife, by performing live with Antonis Remos at the Athens Arena in 2006–07 and 2007–08, with Giannis Parios at the Diogenis Studio in the winter season 2008–09, and with Natassa Theodoridou at the Votanikos in 2011–12, in Athens.

== Personal life ==
Marinella married Stelios Kazantzidis on 7 May 1964 and they toured together in Germany and the United States. They divorced in September 1966. Marinella then began a solo career and eventually married singer Tolis Voskopoulos in 1973. This marriage also ended in divorce in 1981. She had one daughter from her relationship with the entrepreneur and equestrian Freddy Serpieri.

=== Illness and death ===
On 25 September 2024, Marinella was set to perform at the iconic Odeon of Herodes Atticus in Athens. During the performance, audience members noticed that the 86-year-old singer appeared unwell, and she ultimately collapsed while singing her third song of the night. She was rushed to a private hospital, where she was diagnosed with a severe and widespread hemorrhagic stroke and spent 21 days in intensive care. After four months of hospitalization, on 21 January 2025, she was discharged from the hospital and returned home. This concert marked Marinella's final public appearance. According to various sources, she never fully recovered from the stroke and had limited interaction with her surroundings thereafter.

Marinella died in Athens on 28 March 2026, at the age of 87.

== Discography ==
=== Albums ===
- 1964: Kazantzidis & Marinella – Megales Epitihies (Great hits)
- 1965: Chrisos Diskos Kazantzidi & Marinellas (Golden record of Kazantzidis & Marinella)
- 1967: Anapolontas (Remembering with Stelios Kazanztidis and Marinella)
- 1969: Stalia – Stalia (Drop by drop)
- 1969: Kazantzidis & Marinella
- 1969: Otan Simani Esperinos (When the Vesper bells are ringing)
- 1969: Marinella
- 1970: Ena Tragoudi In' I Zoi Mou (A song is my life)
- 1970: Kazantzidis & Marinella Sing Greek Songs
- 1971: Marinella – Enas Mythos (A tale)
- 1971: Ena Karavi Gemato Tragoudia (A ship full of songs) – OST
- 1972: Mia Vradia Me Tin Marinella (An evening with Marinella)
- 1972: Athanata Rebetika (Immortal Rebetiko songs)
- 1973: Mia Vradia Me Tin Marinella No.2 (An evening with Marinella no.2)
- 1973: Albania
- 1974: Marinella & Voskopoulos
- 1974: Marinella Gia Panta (Marinella forever) – Cyprus release
- 1974: Marinella & Tolis Voskopoulos – Ego Ki' Esy (You and I)
- 1975: Marinella Gia Panta (Marinella forever)
- 1976: Marinella & Kostas Hatzis – Recital (Recital)
- 1976: Alli Mia Fora (Once again)
- 1977: Marinella & Athenians
- 1978: I Marinella Tou Simera (Marinella of today)
- 1979: S' Agapo (I love you)
- 1980: I Marinella Se Tragoudia Tis Vembo (Marinella in songs of Vembo)
- 1980: Marinella & Kostas Hatzis – To Tam - Tam (The tam-tam)
- 1981: Marinella – Gia 'Senane Mporo (For you, I can)
- 1982: 15 Chronia Marinella (15 years of Marinella)
- 1983: Gia 'Sena Ton Agnosto (For you, the unknown)
- 1984: Megales Stigmes (Great times)
- 1985: I Agapi Mas (Our love)
- 1986: Mia Nihta (One night)
- 1987: Marinella & Kostas Hatzis – Synantisi (Encounter)
- 1988: Tolmo (I dare)
- 1989: Ise Mia Thiella (You're a storm)
- 1990: Lege Mou "S' agapo" (Keep telling me "I love you")
- 1991: Stelios Kazantzidis & Marinella – Ta Tragoudia Tis Amerikis (The songs of America)
- 1992: I Marinella Tragouda Mimi Plessa (Marinella sings Mimis Plessa)
- 1992: I Marinella Tragouda Megales Kyries (Marinella sings Great Ladies)
- 1993: To Ximeroma Tou Erota (The dawn of love)
- 1994: I Marinella Tragouda Hatzinasio (Marinella sings George Hadjinassios)
- 1995: I Prova Tou Nifikou (Fitting of the wedding dress) – OST
- 1995: Ta Prota Mou Tragoudia (My first songs 1967 – 1970)
- 1996: Ta Prota Mou Tragoudia Nο. 2 (My first songs No. 2 1971 – 1974)
- 1997: Gia Proti Fora (For the first time)
- 1997: Tragoudia Apo Tis 45' Strofes (Songs of 45' rpm vinyl records)
- 1998: I Marinella Tragouda Ke Thimate(Marinella sings and remembers)
- 1999: Me Varka To Tragoudi (On a boat of song)
- 2000: Ystera, irthan i melisses (Then, came the bees) – OST
- 2003: Marinella & George Dalaras – Mazi (Together)
- 2003: Mia agkalia tragoudia (A hug full of songs)
- 2004: Ammos itane (It was sand)
- 2005: Tipota Den Ginete Tihea (Νothing happens by chance)
- 2005: Ego (The Very Best of EMI Years 1957 – 1995)
- 2006: 50 Chronia Marinella - Ta Logia Ine Peritta (50 years of Marinella - Words are unnecessary)
- 2007: Marinella & Antonis Remos – Live

== Appearances in film, theater and television ==
=== Film ===
Marinella's first appearance in the cinema was with Stelios Kazantzidis - the most popular artistic couple of the time - in the 1960 film "I kyria dimarhos" (The Mayoress). In the film they sing two of their big hits of that time, "Ziguala" and "Gia mas pote min ximerosei". In the film Marinella sings alone, the song "Allaxane ta pragmata" which was written especially for the film and relates to women's empowerment which is one of the themes of this comedy.
In 1962 she appears again with Kazantzidis in the melodramatic film "Klapse ftohi mou kardia" (Cry my poor heart) singing their hit "Fevgo me pikra sta ksena". In 1965 the couple sang in the film "Oi adistaktoi" (The ruthless), the song of Yannis Markopoulos "Pios dromos ine anichtos" in which the leading actor of the film, Nikos Kourkoulos, participates.
Kazantzidis and Marinella appeared together for the last time on screen in 1966, in Andreas Katsimitsoulias' film "Angeloi tis amartias" (Angels of Sin) with the song "Na fygo, na fygo".

Her big personal successes, however, would come in 1968 and 1969. In 1968 she would appear in two films with two songs that marked her career: in the comedy "O pio kalos o mathitis" (The best student) she sang Giorgos Zampetas's "Stalia-stalia" - which gave the title to her first solo album, and in the musical "Gorgones kai magkes" when she sang "Anixe Petra", with music by Mimis Plessas and lyrics by Lefteris Papadopoulos. Her performance especially in this song launched her career and is still associated with her name to this day.
In 1969 she also sang in two films three songs that also become big hits: "Pios in' aftos" in the film "O Blofatzis"(The bluffer) and "Dos' mou t' athanato nero" and "Zografismena sto charti" in "I Pariziana"(The Parisienne).
In total, she appeared as a singer in 24 films.

== Theatre ==
Marinella appeared in the theatre in the summer of 1962 in the revue Omorfi Poli with music and songs by Mikis Theodorakis. The artistic couple Kazantzidis and Marinella were enlisted to boost the audience attendance, which was not as expected.

In 2010 she was to star in the theatrical performance Marinella - The musical a musical theatre performance that tells the story of her life. The musical, directed by Stamatis Fasoulis, became a great commercial and artistic success.

== Television ==
She participated in two television series by Kostas Koutsomytis. In 1995 she performed the title song and seven other songs in the drama series I prova tou nyfikou while in 2000 she played the role of Marika Suez, the patron of a theatrical troupe, in the series Ystera irthan oi melisses.

Preceded by none	Greece in the Eurovision Song Contest; 1974	Succeeded by Mariza Koch with Panagia mou, panagia mou
