= Ifigeneia Giannopoulou =

Greek songwriter

Ifigeneia Giannopoulou (Greek: Ιφιγένεια Γιαννοπούλου; 1964 – June 24, 2004) was a Greek songwriter. She also wrote books for children. Giannopoulou worked with great names of Greek music.

== Personal life and education ==
Giannopoulou studied Law at the Athens Law School and journalism at the Journalism Workshop of Hayios. she spent twelve years at the National Conservatory and the Hellenic Conservatory.

She had rheumatoid arthritis.

== Career ==
=== Writing ===
While in university, she began working as a children's television presenter on ERT.

Giannopoulou began writing children's books in the 1980s, writing 13 in total. She also wrote at least three children's plays, and around 500 scripts for television.

From 1987, Giannopoulou worked as a journalist and editor.

=== Music ===
She began working as a lyricist in 1985, contributing to around 700 songs. She collaborated with artists such as Manto, Marinella, Manolis Mitsias, Christos Nikolopoulos, Antonis Kalogiannis, Pitsa Papadopoulou, Mimis Plessas, Thanasis Polykandriotis, and the OMU.

Some songs she contributed to were "Stou fengariou tin agalaki", "Me mia agalaki tradiou", "Kati gentiena", "Stous pente anemous", "Giaiti kirki kirki", "Treis i ora", "Th eksetas", "Ti sou chrostao", and "Stis alykes tou komsomo".

In 1991, she wrote the lyrics for Nadir, a song cycle composed by Stamos Semsis and sung by Tania Tsanaklidou.

In 1997, UNESCO commissioned her to write the 1998 Official Song of UNESCO.

== Awards ==
In 1991, she received an award for the lyrics of her song “Stous pente anemous,” which was composed by Stefanos Korkolis.

== Death ==
Giannopoulou died suddenly on June 24, 2004 as a result of suspected allergic reaction. She had visited an edinocrinology office shortly before her death, and the doctor was later taken to trial for manslaughter; in June 2009 the doctor was sentenced to two and a half years in prison.

Her funeral took place at Nea Erythraia Cemetery on June 26, 2004.
