= Takis Mousafiris =

Greek composer, lyricist and songwriter (1936–2021)

- Born: 1936; Ioannina, Greece
- Died: 11 March 2021 (aged 84) Athens, Greece
- Occupations: Composer, lyricist and songwriter

Takis Mousafiris (Greek: Τάκης Μουσαφίρης; 1936 – 11 March 2021) was a Greek composer, lyricist and songwriter. He collaborated with several notable Greek singers such as Stratos Dionysiou, Dimitris Mitropanos, Rita Sakellariou and Tolis Voskopoulos, among others. He sometimes used two pseudonyms for his works, Antonis Zannas (Αντώνης Ζάννας) and Nikos Michael (Νίκος Μιχαήλ).

Mousafiris was born in 1936 in Ioannina, Greece, although he later moved to Athens, feeling great affinity for both cities. His father was from Kalarrytes, while his mother was from Syrrako. Mousafiris was an ethnic Aromanian, with his parents originating from ethnic Aromanian villages. Mousafiris stated on an interview that traditional Aromanian music influenced him and that both of his parents played musical instruments.

Mousafiris died on 11 March 2021 at the age of 84 from a cancer he had been fighting against for 6 months. He had been diagnosed with COVID-19 shortly before and managed to recover from it prior to his death, according to a statement from Mousafiris' family. He was buried on 13 March in his birthplace, Ioannina.
