= Yiannis Parios =

Greek vocalist

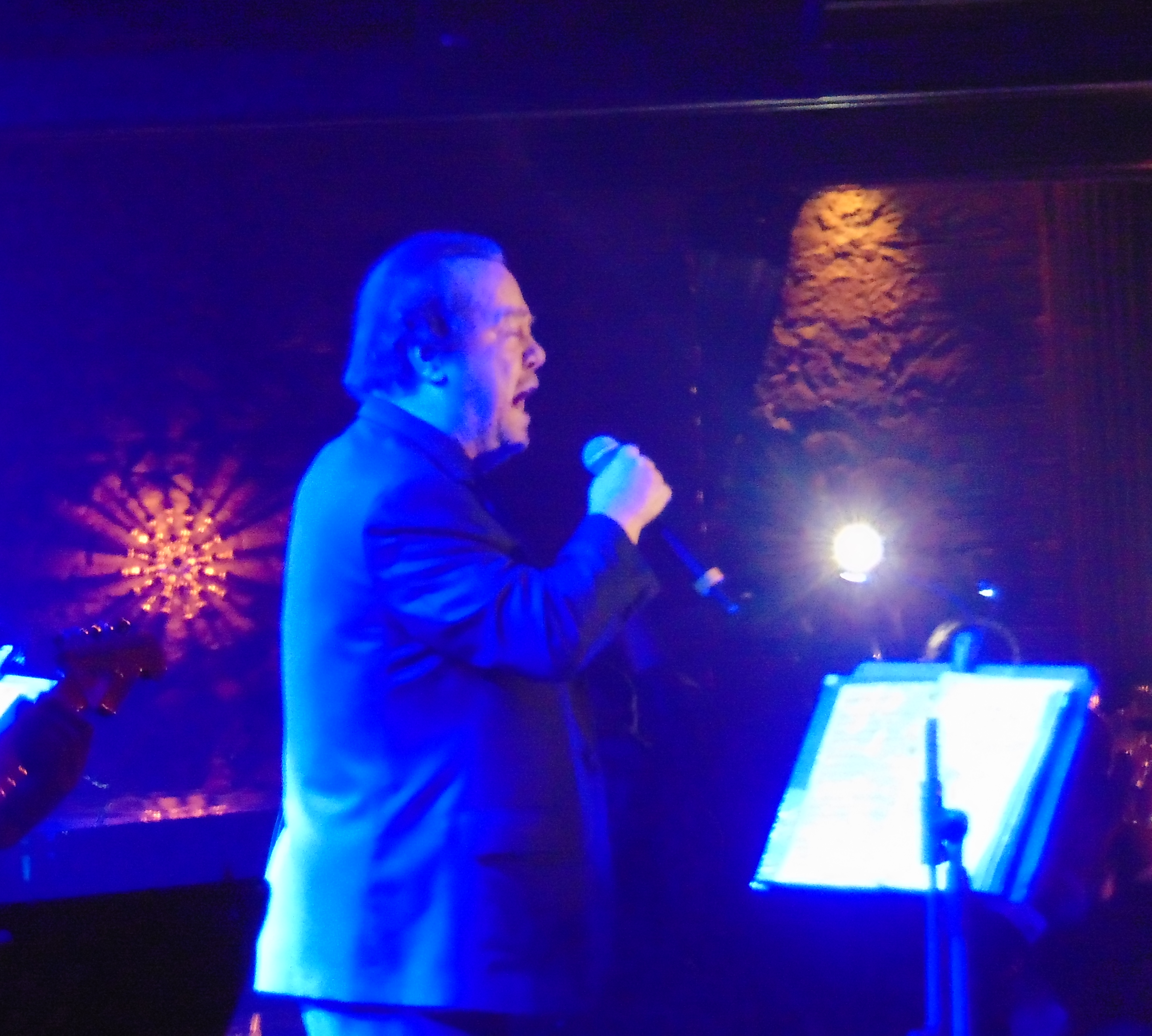

Background information
- Born: Ioannis Varthakouris; Ιωάννης Βαρθακούρης; 8 March 1946 (age 80); Paros, Kingdom of Greece
- Genres: Éntekhno, folk
- Occupation: Singer
- Years active: 1969–present
- Labels: EMI, Philips, Minos EMI, Sony
- Spouses: Dina Markopoulou (m. 1972; div. 1982); Sophia Aliberti (m. 1996; div. 1998)

Yiannis Parios (Greek: Γιάννης Πάριος; born 8 March 1946) is a Greek singer, with a career spanning five decades.

== Biography ==
Yiannis Parios was born Ioannis Varthakouris (Ιωάννης Βαρθακούρης) on 8 March 1946, in Paros. He made his first appearance as a singer in 1969.

In 1985, he released his 15th album Ego kai esy (Greek: Εγω και εσύ; English: Me and you). It contains the greatest hit of the singer "Kokkino Garyfallo" ("Red Carnation"), featuring Haris Alexiou. "Imerologio Monaksias" song from this album was covered by Alpay and Ajda Pekkan, who are famous Turkish singers. Alpay covered it as "Hayalimdeki Resim" ("Picture in my dream" in Turkish) with lyrics of Fecri Ebcioğlu at "Hayalimdeki Resim" album, was released in 1987. Ajda Pekkan covered it as "Yalnızlık Yolcusu" ("Passenger of loneliness" in Turkish) with lyrics of Fikret Şeneş at "Süperstar 4" ("Superstar 4" in Turkish) album, was released in 1987. However, Alpay's cover was more successful than Ajda's and "Hayalimdeki Resim" was the most successful work for him.

Parios' 29th album, Parea me ton Harry (Greek: Παρέα με τον Χάρη; English: Parea me ton Harry), was released in Greece in November 1995 by Minos EMI. It reached 3× platinum status. This is the second collaboration of Yannis Parios with his songwriter son Harry Varthakouris after their 1984 classic hit "Pio kali i monaxia".

Tipseis, (Greek: Τύψεις; English: Remorse) his 31st studio album, was released on 17 December 1997 in Greece by Minos EMI and reached double platinum status, selling 100,000 units. This is the first collaboration of Parios with songwriter, Phoebus.

Yannis Parios was the first Greek singer to perform Alain Barriere's song "Tu t'en vas" with Greek lyrics. Under its new title "Tora pia", the song was a hit, on an unprecedented scale for the time, and it marked the beginning of a new age in which many Greek singers adapted "foreign" melodies to Greek lyrics. Yiannis Parios has worked with many of the leading Greek composers, including Manos Loizos, Giorgos Hatzinasios, Stavros Xarchakos, Stamatis Spanoudakis, Yorgos Katsaros, Marios Tokas, Yannis Spanos and Mikis Theodorakis.

He has written lyrics of his own, and often composed music. A number of his songs have been translated and sung abroad. One of his releases holds the record for Greek sales (one million and four hundred thousand units): this was the album "Nisiotika", released in 1982 and consisting of a collection of songs of the Aegean islands which, as an islander himself, he may have learnt and first sang in childhood. Yiannis Parios has performed in Greece, at Royal Albert Hall, Carnegie Hall and most of the major venues in Canada, Australia, the United States, Germany, Belgium, Switzerland, Turkey and Israel.

== Personal life ==
Parios has four sons from two marriages. His sons, Harry Varthakouris and Nikolas Varthakouris are also singers.

== Discography ==
- Yiannis Parios (1971)
- Ti theleis na kano (1972)
- Anthropina kai kathimerina (1973)
- Pou tha paei pou (1974)
- Erhontai stigmes (1975)
- Tora pia (1976)
- Mi fevgeis mi (1977)
- Na giati se agapisa (1978)
- Tha me thymitheis (1979)
- Se hreiazomai (1980)
- Ena gramma (1981)
- Ta nisiotika (1982)
- Otan vradiazi (1983)
- Pio kali i monaksia (1984)
- Ego kai esy (1985)
- Xarhakos-Parios (1986)
- Ola gia ton erota (1987)
- I megaliteres epityxies tou (1987)
- Pistos (1988)
- Ta erotika tou '50 (1988)
- I parastasi arxizi (1989)
- San trelo fortigo (1989)
- Ki ego mazi sou (1990)
- Epithesi agapis (1991)
- Ta nisiotika 2 (1992)
- Epafi (1992)
- Panta erotevmenos (1993)
- Vios erotikos (1994)
- Parea me ton Harry (1995)
- I monaksia mes ap' ta matia mou (1996)
- Tipsis (1997)
- Tosa grammata (1998)
- Dose mou ligaki ourano (1999)
- Parios erotas (2000)
- O erotikos Theodorakis (2001)
- Alli mia fora (2001)
- Mia varka na pas apenanti (2002)
- To kalo pou sou thelo (2003)
- Mia sinithismeni mera (2003)
- De gyrizo piso (2005)
- Ta dueta tou erota (2006)
- Pou pame meta (2008)
- Symperasma ena (2009)
- Ta kommatia ths psyxhs mou (2010)
- O kyklos tou erota (2013)
- O dikos mou Tsitsanis (2013)
- Oneira kano (2014)
- Ela mou amogela mou (2016)
- Eho esena (2018)
- Ah agapi... Ah erota (2020)
- Ta thalassina tou Pariou (2025)
