= Minos EMI =

Greek music recording company

Minos-EMI S.A.
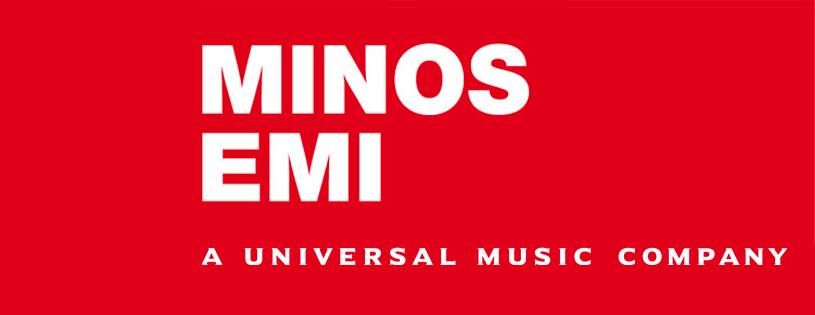
- Type: Subsidiary
- Industry: Music
- Founded: 1931; 95 years ago
- Headquarters: Athens, Greece
- Parent: EMI (1931–1979; 1996–2012); Thorn EMI (1979–1996); Universal Music Group (2012–present)
- Website: www.minosemi.gr

Minos EMI is a record company based in Athens, Greece. The company serves as the Greek record label and offices of the multinational Universal Music Group.

EMI is credited for founding the record business in Greece in the 1930s, by producing the first records and building the country's first recording studio.

== Founding of recorded music in Greece ==
In 1930, British Columbia Graphophone Company and Gramophone Company, which a year later merged to form EMI Group, formed a partnership along with Greek investor Lambropoulos Brothers Limited to produce records in Greece. By 1931, company operations were in full swing and the first disc produced in Greece had been pressed under the company name EMIAL. After five years of using the halls of large hotels to record songs, EMIAL built Greece's first recording studio and became the front runner in the Greek music industry for many years. The company continued to be incorporated as EMIAL, although it predominantly used the trade name EMI Greece. EMI's domestic Greek releases during this period generally came out bearing the company's British legacy labels, including Columbia, His Master's Voice, and Parlophone, as well as the Odeon label.

== Merger with Minos Matsas & Son ==
Minos Matsas & Son logo

In 1991, EMIAL purchased a controlling share of Minos Matsas & Son, founded by pioneering Greek music industry executive and prominent rebetiko musician Minos Matsas, and relaunched the company under the name Minos EMI. At the time of the acquisition, "Minos Matsas & Son" was led by Makis Matsas, who became CEO of the new entity. It was identified that Minos EMI would command one-third of the Greek market, as Minos Matsas & Son held a 22% market share, while EMIAL held 9%.

The labour union at Minos Matsas & Son was unsatisfied that EMI Greece (EMIAL) was now controlling Minos Matsas, as EMI Greece opted to engage in layoffs at Minos Matsas, instead of integrating the existing company into EMI Greece's operations. The two distribution centers merged at EMI Greece's historical building, which was located in the Athens suburb of Rizoupoli, while most of the remaining staff joined Minos Matsas' offices on Messogeion Avenue. EMI Greece CFO Panayotis Papalimberis was retained, while the artistic direction went to Minos A&R managers: Achileas Theofilou, Elias Benettos and Vangelis Yannopoulos. EMI Greece's foreign repertoire manager, Manos Xydous, was chosen to undertake a domestic A&R role by launching the EMI label Harvest Records as a domestic repertoire imprint. Costas Bourmas was hired as managing director, who came from the same position at Sony Music Greece.

The Minos label under Minos EMI, which read "Progress in Song".

The Minos label saw a continuity as a local A&R imprint. Artists not specifically under the Minos A&R operation, generally only carried the EMI label. The distinction of artists by imprint was usually only carried out on album covers, reflecting internal A&R management.

== Heritage of the Minos EMI back catalogue ==
The Minos EMI back catalogue – from the inheritances of both the EMIAL and Minos Matsas & Son discographies – carries important works of Greek recorded music heritage in many different genres, although most notably in the genres of Rebetiko and Laïko. Minos EMI actively exploits its catalogue by remastering works for re-releases, compilations and special releases, as well as through licensing to third-party strategic marketers.

Select recordings from Minos EMI's catalogue have seen international release by labels within the EMI Group, including under world music label EMI Hemisphere and EMI Classics. These collaborations began between EMI Hemisphere founder, Gerald Seligman, and Vangelis Yannopoulos, Minos EMI A&R and Strategic Manager.

== Minos EMI in the 21st century ==
Since 2001, Minos EMI was the sole EMI label operation in Greece, following the closure of Virgin Records Greece. "EMI Music Greece" was the moniker used to refer to Minos EMI in an international context, following the EMI Group naming convention for national EMI offices around the world.

Between 2002 and 2004, Minos EMI handled the distribution of BMG in Greece, having acquired the rights after the closure of BMG Greece. Following the global joint venture (between BMG and Sony Music Entertainment) forming Sony BMG, Sony Music Greece saw its offices being converted to Sony BMG Greece. As a result of a (jointly-owned) BMG company being re-introduced into the Greek market (via Sony BMG Greece), the pre-existing distribution agreement with Minos EMI terminated under a clause allowing BMG to take back distribution should the company re-establish in Greece.

As of mid-2008, music channel MAD TV discontinued its practice of marking music videos by imprint, instead opting to solely label all releases as EMI. As of late 2010, the discontinuation of the Minos label also began on the CD covers of Minos artists, also leaving all domestic releases marked only with the EMI label.

In October 2010, Minos EMI entered into a 4-year agreement with the recently launched Greek edition of video sharing service Dailymotion, securing exclusive rights for Dailymotion to premiere all new music videos. The deal also called for the addition of over 1,000 new, old, and rare music videos, accessible to website's users worldwide.

=== Acquisition by Universal Music Group ===
Following the completion of the acquisition of EMI Group by Universal Music Group in September 2012, several European EMI operations were placed for sale to comply with European competition laws, and were subsequently acquired by Warner Music Group. In the Greek market hitherto, Universal Music Group had its label operation, Universal Music Greece, which was chosen over Minos EMI to be included in the sale of European assets. As a result, Greece was the only European country where a Universal Music office was chosen for divestiture, instead of an EMI office. Universal Music Greece was acquired by Greek investors and relaunched as an independent label named Cobalt Music(which was subsequently acquired by Sony Music in December 2024).

Upon the restructuring and integration of its operations, Universal Music Group chose to discontinue EMI worldwide as a standalone label. However continuity of the EMI brand was established through a dual branding approach with other EMI legacy labels, such as in the creation of Virgin EMI (now EMI Records and Virgin Records) in the UK and through the preservation of "EMI Recorded Music Australia" in Australia and "Minos EMI" in Greece. These EMI-branded trademarks now stand as unique labels in their own right.

== Artists ==
=== Past ===
- Grigoris Bithikotsis
- Manos Hatzidakis
- Stelios Kazantzidis
- Stavros Kouyioumtzis
- Christos Kyriazis
- Manos Loizos
- Yannis Markopoulos
- Nikos Oikonomopoulos
- Peggy Zina
- Dimitris Mitropanos
- Despina Vandi
- Pantelis Pantelidis
- Giannis Papaioannou
- Opikos Stounmbinto
- Mimis Plessas
- Mikis Theodorakis
- Vassilis Tsitsanis
- Markos Vamvakaris
- Anna Vissi
- Mad Clip
- STAN
- Stavros Xarchakos
- Maria Nomikou
- Natassa Theodoridou
- Maria Elena Kyriakou
- Evridiki
- Lavrentis Machairitsas
- Loukas Yorkas
- Harry Klynn
- Giorgos Mazonakis

=== Current ===
- Yiannis Parios
- Giorgos Dalaras
- Anna Rezan
- Sakis Rouvas
- Elena Paparizou
- Eleonora Zouganeli
- Kostis Maraveyas
- Giannis Kotsiras
- Stavento
- Tamta
- Toquel
- Panos Mouzourakis
- SNIK
- Ivi Adamou
- Lakis Papadopoulos
- Petros Iakovidis
- Katahthonios
- Ypohthonios
- Kostas Ageris
- Yianna Terzi
- Katerine Duska
- Antique
- Anastasia
- Archolekas
- Barbara Argyrou
- Marseaux
- Onirama
- Xenia Ghali
- Katerina Lioliou
- Rena Morfi
- Iasonas Mandilas
- Eirini Papadopoulou
- Yianna Terzi
- Katerina Stikoudi
- Marina Satti
- Akylas

== See also ==
- List of EMI labels
