= List of Laniteio people =

The list of Laniteio people includes notable graduates, professors, and administrators affiliated with the Laniteio Greek Gymnasium (modern-day Laniteio Lyceum and Laniteio Gymnasium). For a list of Laniteio's principals, see Principal of Laniteio.

One President of Cyprus has graduated from Laniteio (Spyros Kyprianou), while another was a non-graduate alumni (George Vassiliou).

== Alumni ==
Alumni of Laniteio
Name	Notability	Reference(s)
Spyros Kyprianou	President of Cyprus from 1977 to 1988	
George Vassiliou	President of Cyprus from 1988 to 1993	
Stella Soulioti	Minister of Justice of the Republic of Cyprus	
Kriton Tornaritis	Attorney General of the Republic of Cyprus	
Rennos Frangoudis	Olympian Sprinter	
Domnitsa Lanitou-Kavounidou	Olympian Sprinter	
Michael Cacoyannis	Film and Stage Director	
John Modinos	Baritone	
Marios Tokas	Composer	
Georgios Papadopoulos		
Theofilos Kakoullos		
Charis Aivaliotis		
Christakis Telonis		
Andreas Chatzigiannis		
Nikolaos Oikonomou	Pianist	

== Faculty ==
Faculty of Laniteio
Name	Years taught	Profession	Reference(s)
Giorgos Fasouliotis	1915 to 1928	Music	
Vasileios Tatakis	1923 to 1926	Philosophy	
Solon Michaelides	1941 to 1956	Composer, Teacher, Musicologist	
Viktor Ioannidis	1948 to 1965	Music	
