= Laniteio =

Laniteio School Area (/lə.ˈnɪ.tɪ.oʊ/; Greek: Χώρος Λανιτείων Εκπαιδευτηρίων, lit. 'Area of the Laniteio Schools'), or Laniteio (Greek: Λανίτειο), may refer to any of the establishments located within the school grounds located in Limassol, Cyprus, including:

- Laniteio Lyceum
- Laniteio Gymnasium
