= Nicolas Economou =

Cypriot composer, pianist (1953–1993)

- Born: 11 August 1953; Nicosia, Cyprus
- Died: 29 December 1993 (aged 40); Cyprus
- Occupations: Classical pianist; Composer; Conductor

Nicolas Economou (Greek: Νικόλας Οικονόμου; 11 August 1953 – 29 December 1993) was a Cypriot composer, pianist and conductor born in Nicosia, Cyprus.

Economou came to international attention at the 1969 Tchaikovsky Competition when he was 16. After studying at the Tchaikovsky Conservatory in Moscow he eventually moved via Düsseldorf to Munich. From his base there he established himself throughout Europe as a concert pianist, composer, arranger, conductor and organiser of music festivals. In December 1993 Economou died in a car accident in Cyprus.

== Early life, training ==
Nicolas Economou was the first child of his family. His parents, who loved classical music, decided to expose him to music as a creative outlet rather than a career. At the age of five, he started taking piano lessons and soon began improvising on the piano and composing short pieces of music. When Solon Michaelides, the celebrated Cypriot composer, conductor, musicologist and friend of the family heard him play for the first time, when Economou was not yet seven years old, he declared: "This child is a blessing to his parents, Cyprus, and the World". On his advice, Economou's musical training was undertaken by George Arvanitakis.

The turning point in Economou's life came at the age of ten. It had to be decided whether he would eventually take up music as a career. Again Solon Michaelides, who was following Economou's progress, suggested that his musical education should be continued outside Cyprus where he would have greater opportunities. In September 1964, after an audition, he was accepted at the Special School of Music of the Tchaikovsky Conservatory in Moscow, a preparatory school for youngsters to enter the Conservatory. In December of that year, in Athens, he won the "Keti Papaioannou" Panhellenic Competition for young musicians up to the age of seventeen. The following year at the age of twelve, he began his musical studies in Moscow.

After three years of studies, his piano teacher suggested that he should enter the Tchaikovsky Competition, an international music competition. After a year of preparation and at the age of sixteen, he participated in the competition, gaining favourable reviews from the press, radio and television. A year later, he was admitted to the Tchaikovsky Conservatory itself. Leaving Moscow in 1972, he moved to Düsseldorf, before settling in Munich, Germany, where he studied at the University of Music and Performing Arts Munich, studying piano under Ludwig Hoffmann and composition under Wilhelm Killmayer.

== Pianist ==
As a performer, he appeared in Europe, the US and Canada as well as the USSR, Japan, Iceland, and Israel. He performed solo, and with orchestras and other famous performers and composers like Martha Argerich, Rodion Shchedrin, Sviatoslav Richter, Michel Beroff, Chick Corea and others. As well as performing in concert with Martha Argerich and Chick Corea, he also recorded with them. The record with Chick Corea, entitled On Two Pianos, was the result of a series of concerts in Germany in 1981/82 during which the two musicians interacted with each other by improvising in their own style. He also released two other solo albums.

The Nicolas Economou Foundation posthumously published seven CDs under the series title L'Art de Nicolas Economou, compiling hours of recordings that Economou left behind.

== Composer ==
Economou studied composition with Vladislav Zolotaryov and Wilhelm Killmayer. He wrote music for piano, for small ensembles, symphonic music and film music. Many of his compositions have themes and rhythms from Cyprus and the Mediterranean. Some of his compositions are: Children Studies, Sonata for Chick (dedicated to Chick Corea) for piano, Cyprus Picture and Cyprus Dances for an ensemble of eight players. He wrote the soundtracks for twelve films including Rosa Luxemburg and Die bleierne Zeit, both by Margarethe von Trotta.

Economou also arranged Tchaikovsky's The Nutcracker Suite (originally written for orchestra) for two pianos, dedicated to his daughter and Martha Argerich's daughter. Economou also arranged Vivaldi's The Four Seasons for four pianos.

== Conductor and organiser ==
In 1978, with the collaboration of the City of Munich, Economou organised a "Cyprus Week" in Munich, with artists from Cyprus including actors, musicians, painters, sculptors and the late shadow performer, Paphios. He was also the founder of the "Solisten Ensemble" in Munich with which he performed some of his compositions and those of other composers. He was the co-founder of the well-established Münchner Klaviersommer (Munich Piano Summer). In February 1992 he organised in Venice the first of a series of piano festivals he intended to establish in Europe with the title "Pianisti non-Solo".

As a conductor he directed the distinguished Moscow Chamber Orchestra, the Bavarian Symphony Orchestra, Germany's Youth Orchestra and the La Fenice Opera Orchestra of Venice.

== Recognition and awards ==
In acknowledgement of his services and contribution to culture and the arts in general, Economou was honoured on various occasions by several bodies.

- The city of Munich honoured him in 1979 for his contribution to the arts, as a composer and interpreter of classical and modern music, with the award for "Best Interpreter of the Year".
- In 1983, the Bavarian TV produced a television portrait of Economou, more than an hour in duration, in which he is shown in all facets of his creative life. The film, called Kreisleriana (after the work for piano by Schumann), was directed by Klaus Voswinkel.
- Since 1988, a seat bearing his name has stood in the Prinzregententheater of the City of Munich, next to seats of other prominent artists.
- In Cyprus he was honoured with the 1991 "Tefkros Anthias and Theodosis Pierides Award".
- Because of his outstanding contribution to music, he was accepted in 1992 into one of Europe's prominent societies, the Academia Scientiarum et Artium Europaea (The European Academy of Sciences and Arts), members of which are Nobel prize winners, politicians, artists, church dignitaries and others.

== 25th Anniversary memorial concert ==
In October 2018 a memorial concert was held at Prinzregententheater in Munich for his 25th death anniversary. Amongst the artists who performed were Martha Argerich, Rodion Shchedrin, Gerhard Oppitz, and Semeli Economou with Santa Semeli and the Monks.

== Character ==
Economou had many well-known friends, not only musicians but also persons coming from a variety of intellectual backgrounds. Among them was the late philosopher and playwright Friedrich Dürrenmatt, with whom he had a special bond. Others include Arthur Miller and his family, Rodion Shchedrin and the legendary Maya Plisetskaya, Maximilian and Maria Schell, Volker Schlondorff and Margarethe von Trotta. In Greece he had close ties with the late Solon Michaelides, Vangelis, Thanos Mikroutsikos, Dionysis Savvopoulos and Manos Hadjidakis.

== Personal life ==
Nicolas Economou is the father of Semeli Economou from his first marriage to Greek-American born Maritsa Tsirigos.

From 1988 until his death, his partner was art patron and philanthropist Maja Hoffmann.

== Sources ==
- http://www.nicolaseconomou.com including discography and list of compositions
- The Nicolas Economou Foundation including biography
