= Giedrė Šlekytė =

Lithuanian conductor (born 1989)

- Born: 1989 (age 36–37); Vilnius, Lithuania
- Education: National M. K. Čiurlionis School of Art; Universität für Musik und darstellende Kunst Graz; Hochschule für Musik und Theater Felix Mendelssohn Bartholdy Leipzig; Zürcher Hochschule der Künste
- Occupation: Conductor
- Awards: Malko Competition

Giedrė Šlekytė (born 1989) is a Lithuanian conductor.

== Biography ==
Šlekytė was born in Vilnius, the daughter of a mathematician and a dentist. She and her sister sang in a children's choir, whose conductor recommended a school with a focus on the arts. Her ambition changed from singer to dancer, to journalist, and finally to be a conductor. After studies at the National M. K. Čiurlionis School of Art in Vilnius she studied at the Universität für Musik und darstellende Kunst Graz with Johannes Prinz and Martin Sieghart, and at the Hochschule für Musik und Theater Felix Mendelssohn Bartholdy Leipzig with Ulrich Windfuhr and Matthias Foremny. She spent a semester at the Zürcher Hochschule der Künste with Johannes Schlaefli, sponsored by the Erasmus Programme. She took master classes with Riccardo Muti, Bernard Haitink, Colin Metters and Mario Venzago.

In 2013, Šlekytė was awarded second prize at the Solon Michaelides conducting competition in Cyprus. She was nominated, along Lorenzo Viotti and Jiri Rozen, for the Young Conductor Award of the Salzburg Festival in 2015, and received a prize of the Malko Competition. Šlekytė was Erste Kapellmeisterin at the Stadttheater Klagenfurt from 2016 to 2018.

In July 2021, Šlekytė made her debut with the Oper Frankfurt, conducting Poulenc's Dialogues des Carmélites. Due to restrictions in the COVID-19 pandemic, the orchestra had to be reduced to a chamber version, and the women's choir was positioned on the third tier. The conductor said in an interview that she was an admirer of stage director Claus Guth's work already before their project together.

Šlekytė was principal guest conductor (Erste Gastdirigentin) of the Bruckner Orchester Linz from 2022 to 2025, the first female conductor to hold the post with the orchestra. In December 2025, Šlekytė first guest-conducted the Royal Scottish National Orchestra. She returned to the RSNO for recording sessions in 2026. In May 2026, the RSNO announced the appointment of Šlekytė as its next music director, effective with the 2027–2028 season. She took the title of RSNO music director-designate with immediate effect. This appointment marks Šlekytė's first leadership post. Šlekytė is the first female conductor to be named music director of the Royal Scottish National Orchestra.

== Honours and awards ==
- 2013: Second prize Solon Michaelides conducting competition, Cypres
- 2015: Nomination for the Salzburg Festival Young Conductors Award
- 2015: Prize at the Malko Competition
- 2018: International Opera Awards – nomination for the category Newcomer

== Recordings ==
- 2019: Works by Raminta Šerkšnytė, Lithuanian National Symphony Orchestra with Šlekytė, Kremerata Baltica with Mirga Gražinytė-Tyla, Deutsche Grammophon
