= Laniteio Gymnasium =

Oldest operational gymnasium in Limassol, Cyprus

- Λανίτειο Γυμνάσιο
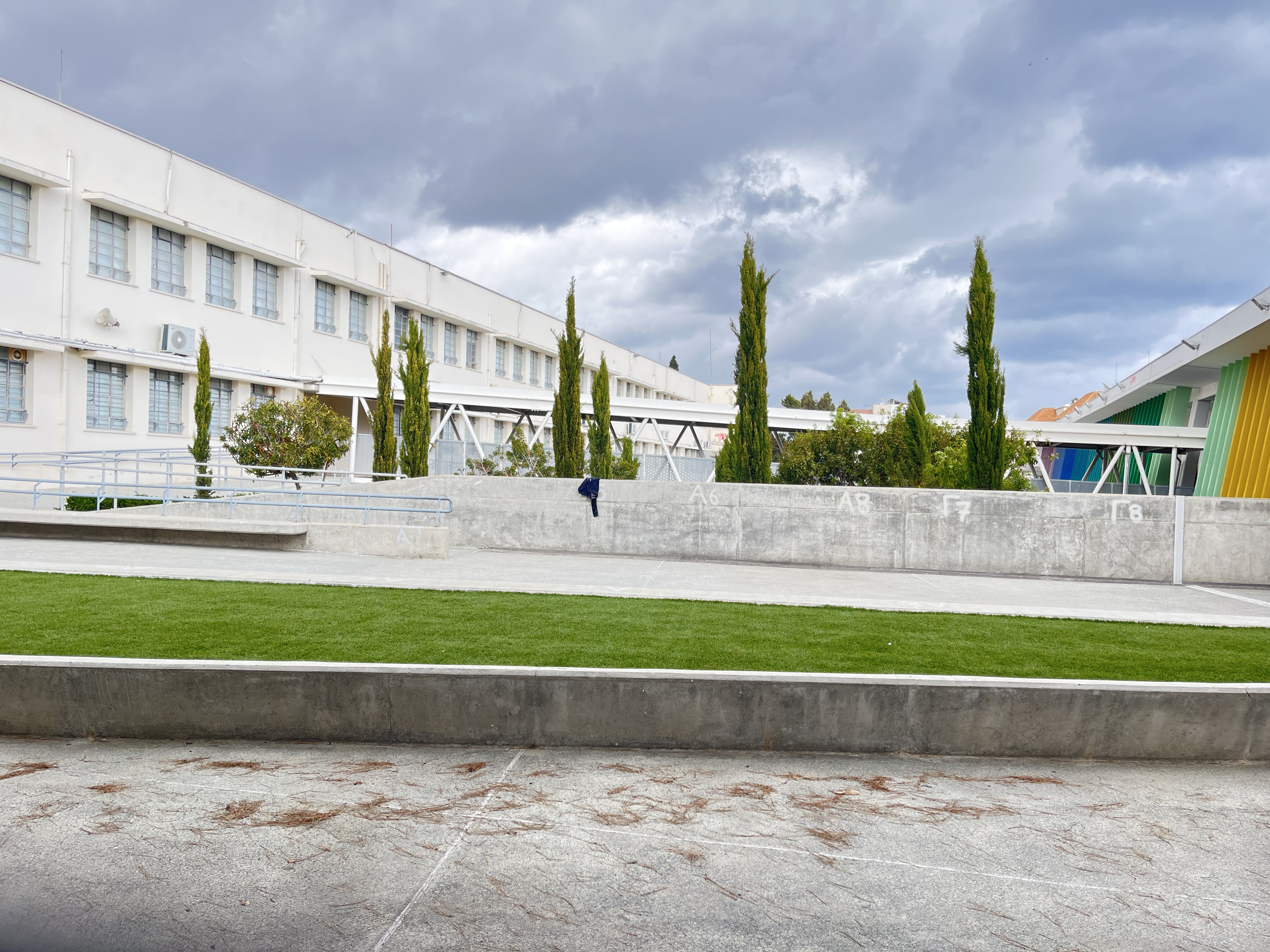
- West entrance

Location
- Limassol, Cyprus; 34°41′24″N 33°2′29″E

Information
- Type: Public gymnasium
- Founded: 1819; 207 years ago
- School district: Limassol
- Principal: Nagia Louka-Papamina (2026-2027)
- Teaching staff: 100
- Secondary years taught: 7th through 9th grades
- Enrollment: 672 (2026-2027)
- Language: Greek
- Website: Laniteio Gymnasium

The Laniteio Gymnasium (/lə.ˈnɪ.tɪ.oʊ/; Greek: Λανίτειο Γυμνάσιο, romanized: Laníteio Gumnásio), founded in 1819 as the Greek School, is the oldest operational gymnasium in Limassol, and the second oldest in Cyprus, after the Pancyprian Gymnasium, in Nicosia.

== History ==
Laniteio Gymnasium's history is tied to that of the Laniteio Lyceum, which both emerged from the split of the Laniteio Greek Gymnasium during Cyprus' 1980s education reform, which divided the school cycle into the Gymnasium and Lyceum cycles.

=== 19th century ===
In 1819, a group of Limassol residents established the city's first one-year Greek School, with Demetrios Themistokleous (Greek: Δημήτρης Θεμιστοκλέους) as the inaugural principal. The school paused operations in 1821 due to the Greek War of Independence, resuming in 1834 as a three-year institution. From 1870 to 1913, Andreas Themistokleous (Greek: Ανδρέας Θεμιστοκλέους), son of Demetrios, served as principal, pioneering physical education in Limassol's schools.

In 1896, an earthquake rendered the school building uninhabitable, prompting the construction of a new facility with help from the Greek Government.

=== 20th century ===
By 1906, the school was recognized as a five-year institution, largely due to Andreas' efforts, and in 1915, it expanded to a six-year school, attaining the same status as schools in Greece.

In the early 1940s, a school-housing crisis arose due to increasing student numbers. In 1945, Nicolas P. Lanitis (Greek: Νικόλαος Π. Λανίτης) significantly contributed to constructing a new school building, now housing the Laniteio Lyceum. Completed in 1952, the school was renamed to Laniteion Greek Gymnasium (Greek: Λανίτειον Ελληνικόν Γυμνάσιον) in honor of Lanitis' contributions.

In 1960, the Greek All-Girl Gymnasium of Limassol (Note: Greek: Ελληνικόν Γυμνάσιον Θήλεων Λεμεσού) began operating in the Laniteio School Area, after being separated from the Laniteion Greek Gymnasium, later renamed to 1st All-Girls Gymnasium of Limassol, (Note: Greek: Α´ Γυμνάσιο Θήλεων Λεμεσού) and finally 5th Gymnasium of Limassol (Ayias Zonis) (Note: Greek: Ε´ Γυμνάσιο Λεμεσού (Αγίας Ζώνης)) in 1973. It began admitting male students in 1974, after the Turkish invasion.

Following the events of 1974, and the sudden influx of refugee students, the 8th Gymnasium of Limassol (Note: Greek: Η΄ Γυμνάσιο Λεμεσού) started operating in the Laniteio school area. Laniteio, along with the 5th Gymnasium, managed morning and evening schedules to accommodate the large number of students.

During the 1980s education reform, the secondary education cycle split into Gymnasium (lower secondary) and Lyceum (upper), both with a three year duration. Laniteio Gymnasium was established, and in 1984, Laniteion Greek Gymnasium was renamed Laniteio Lyceum A', (Note: Greek: Λανίτειο Λύκειο Α΄) while the 5th Gymnasium became Laniteio Lyceum B'. (Note: Greek: Λανίτειο Λύκειο Β΄)

=== 21st century ===
In 2013, Laniteio Gymnasium was relocated to the building previously used by the Laniteio Lyceum B', after the latter merged with the Laniteio Lyceum A' to form the current Laniteio Lyceum.

In 2015, the Athletic School and Music School programs, previously available exclusively for lyceums in the country, was expanded to gymnasiums. Laniteio Gymnasium was chosen for both schools as the Athletic and Music School location for the city.

In December 2018, the south expansion of the Laniteio Gymnasium was completed, more than doubling the school's size. It was inaugurated in May 2019.

In 2024, the school began participating in Erasmus+ (until 2027; renewable).

== Notable people ==
Notable Laniteio alumni include:

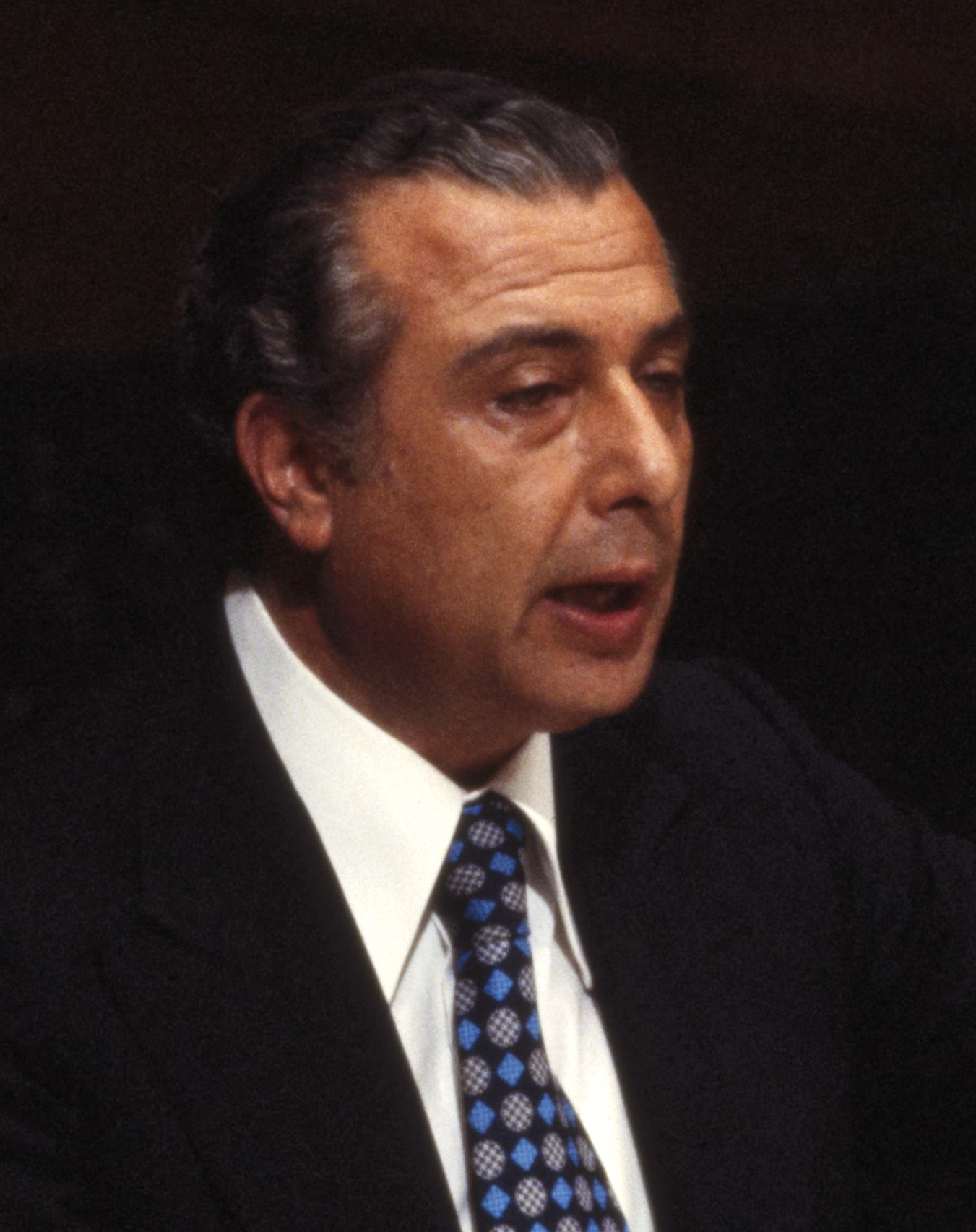
2nd President of Cyprus Spyros Kyprianou

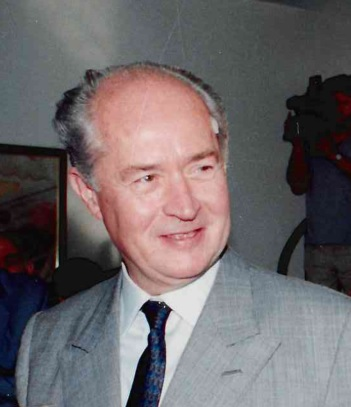
3rd President of Cyprus George Vassiliou

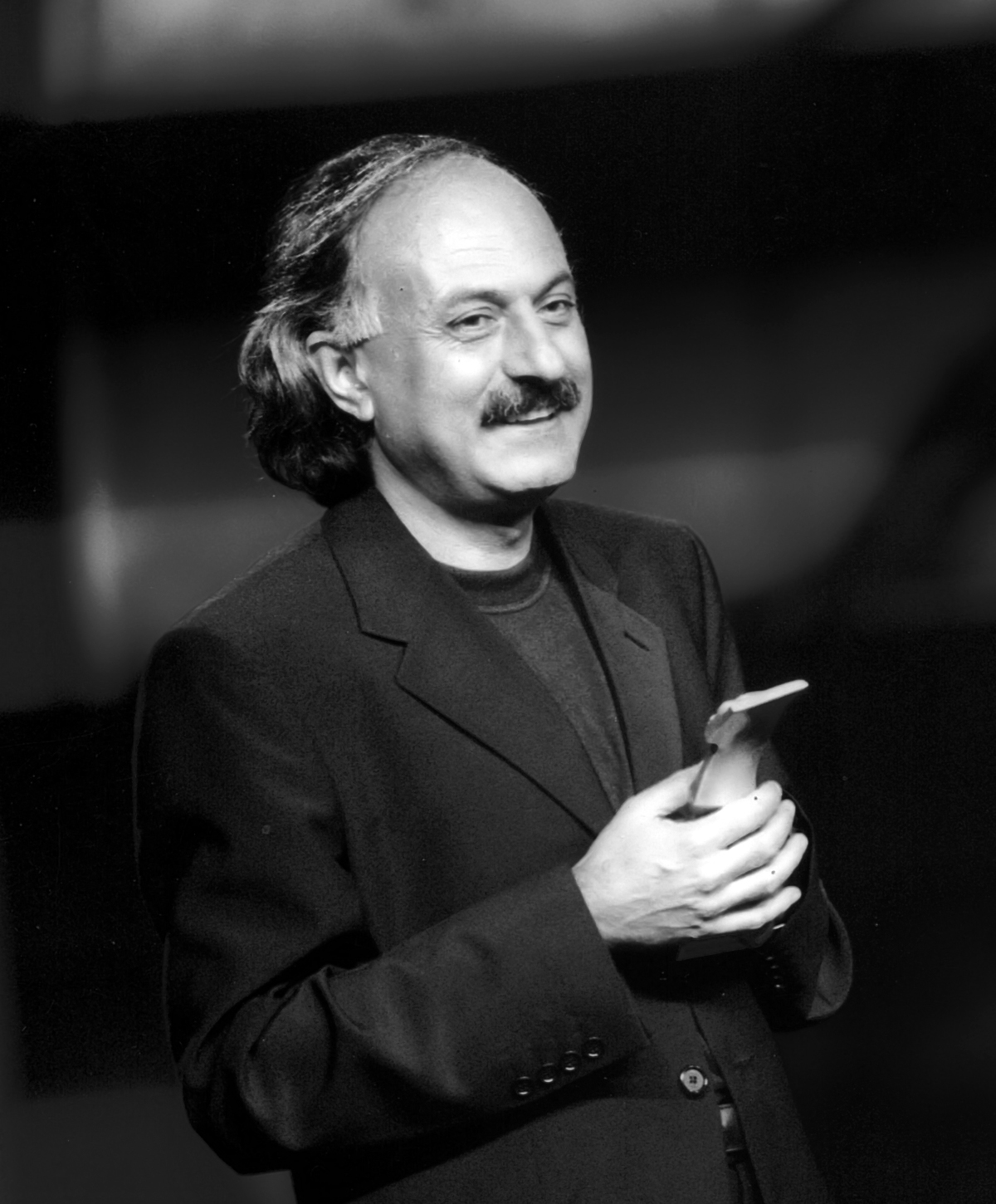
Composer Marios Tokas

== See also ==
- List of Laniteio people
- Laniteio Lyceum
- Pancyprian Gymnasium
- Secondary education in Cyprus
