= Archbishop Makarios III Lyceum =

Public High-School in Strovolos, Nicosia

Archbishop Makarios III Lyceum Dasoupoli
- Λύκειο Αρχιεπισκόπου Μακαρίου Γ’ Δασούπολη
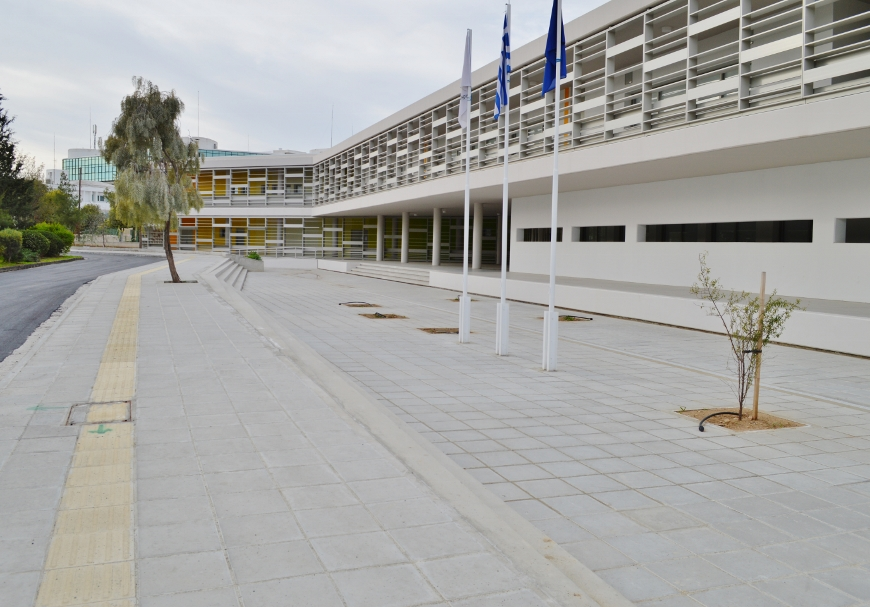
- Main entrance to the lyceum

Location
- Atlantos; Nicosia, Cyprus
- Coordinates: 35.148893°N 33.372510°E

Information
- Other name: Dasoupolis Lyceum; Λύκειο Δασούπολης
- Type: Public High-School
- Founded: 1977; 49 years ago
- School district: Nicosia
- Principal: Dr Maria Georgiou
- Faculty: 93
- Enrollment: 560 (2024-25)
- Website: Dasoupolis Lyceum

Archbishop Makarios III Lyceum Dasoupoli, (Note: Greek: Λύκειο Αρχιεπισκόπου Μακαρίου Γ΄ Δασούπολη, romanized: Lýkeio Archiepiskópou Makaríou G´ Dasoúpoli) also simply known as Dasoupolis Lyceum, (Note: Greek: Λύκειο Δασούπολης, romanized: Lúkeio Dasoúpolēs) is a public high school located in Apostolos Varnavas & Agios Makarios, Strovolos, Nicosia, Cyprus. Founded in 1977, the school is named after Makarios III, the first President of Cyprus and archbishop of the Church of Cyprus from 1950 to 1977, who is sometimes called the 'father of the nation'.

== History ==
Founded in 1977 in Strovolos, Nicosia, the school was initially named after Apostle Barnabas, later being renamed to Archbishop Makarios III Gymnasium in the 1977, after the death of Makarios III. The first students began enrolling in 1978. It gained its current name in 1983 when the school was reclassified as a lyceum. It was established to support refugees from the 1974 Turkish invasion of Cyprus. The school served as a gymnasium from its founding until 1983, then operated as both a gymnasium and lyceum until 1986, when it became solely a lyceum.

One of the largest lyceums in Nicosia, it accommodates about 600 students and 100 staff annually. A new school building began being built in 2012 at the cost of €7,800,000, with the building being ready for use in the academic year 2014-2015. The old campus was demolished, with the only remnant being the old auditorium, which had been inaugurated by then-president, Glafcos Clerides, in 2000. The school also serves as a National Entrance exam centre and polling station. In 2016, its students won the "Pan-Cypriot High School Circle Award" for a research project.

== Student activities ==
=== Publications ===
The school has several student-run publications. The Student Colors (Greek: Μαθητικά Χρώματα, romanized: Mathitiká Chrómata) magazine is the oldest publication at the school. Anazitisis (Greek: Αναζήτησεις, romanized: Anazētḗseis) is published annually at the end of the academic year, and the Dasoupolitis (Greek: Δασουπολίτης, romanized: Dasoupolítis) newspaper is published annually at the end of the first term.

=== Sports ===
Dasoupoli has volleyball and handball teams that have won titles in Pancyprian and nationwide tournaments. Students also participate in athletics competitions, gymnastics, cycling and swimming.

=== Theatre ===
The school has taken part in the Pancyprian School Theatre Competition. (Note: Greek: Παγκύπριοι Σχολικοί Αγώνες Θεάτρου, romanized: Pankýprioi Scholikoí Agónes Theátrou) During the 11th competition, the school won first place and was selected to represent Cyprus at the Panhellenic School Games of Arts, (Note: Greek: Πανελλήνιοι Μαθητικοί Καλλιτεχνικοί Αγώνες, romanized: Panellínioi Mathitikoí Kallitechnikoí Agónes) where they won 2nd place. The play they performed was "Graduates" (Greek: Φοιτηταί, romanized: Foititaí) by Gregorios Xenopoulos.

In the 37th Pancyprian School Theatre Competition of 2026, the school won first place in the Lyceum category of the Nicosia District. The play performed was The Bourgeois Gentleman by Molière.

=== International programmes ===
The school has taken part in a number of international programs, including cooperation with schools in Germany and Austria through the Socrates programme. It also takes part in the Mediterranean branch of Model United Nations (MEDIMUN) and the European Youth Parliament. The school is "twinned" with Arsakeion Lyceum (Greek: Αρσάκειο Λύκειο) of Patras, Greece.

== Gallery ==
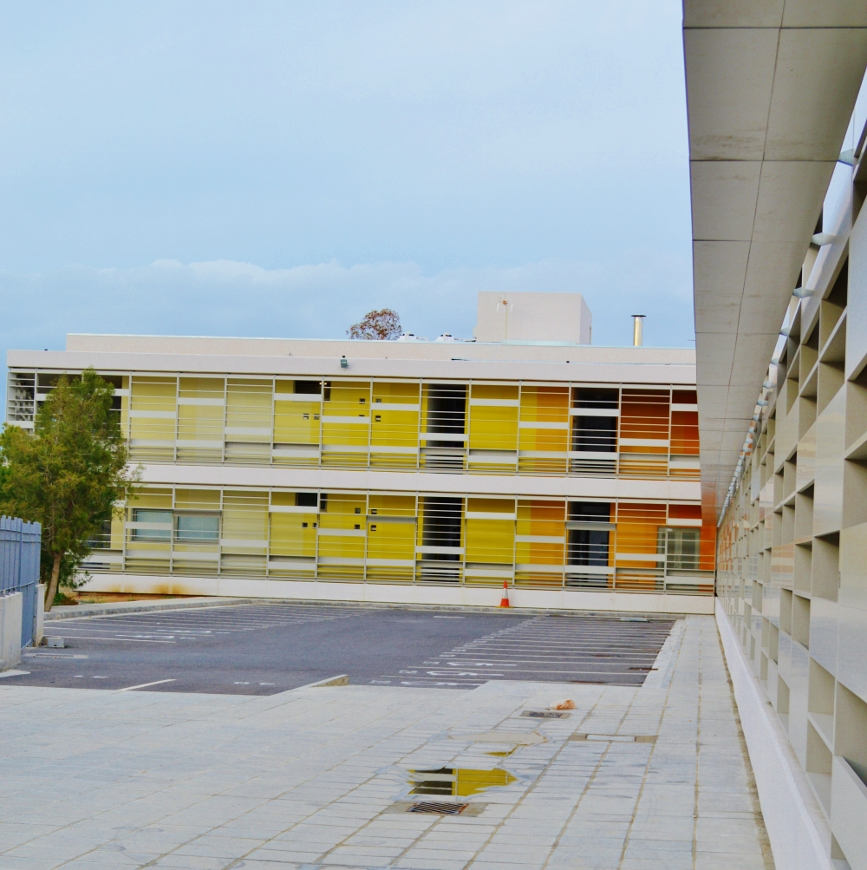

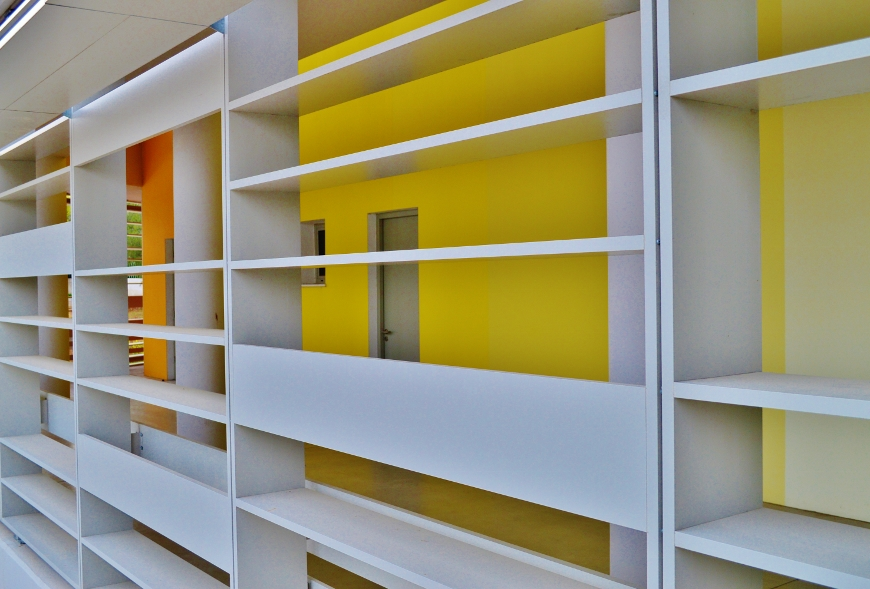

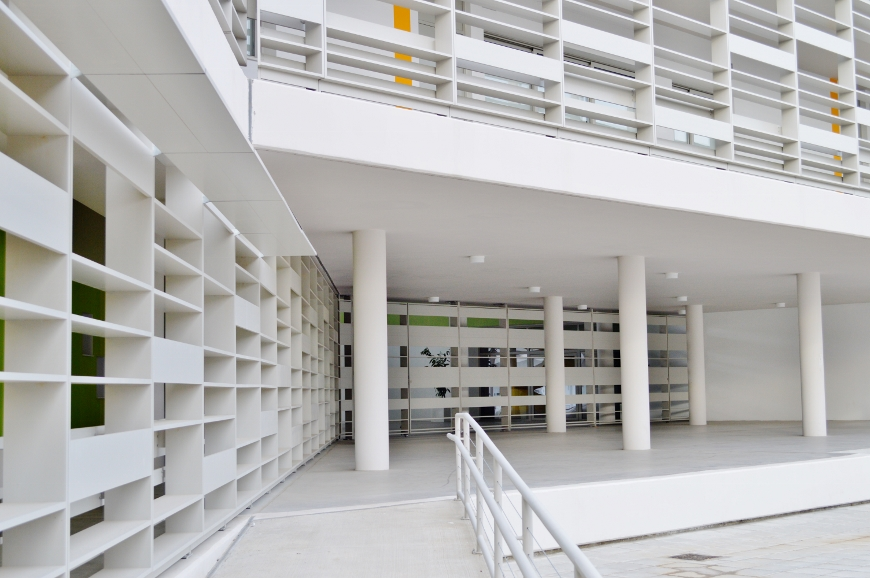

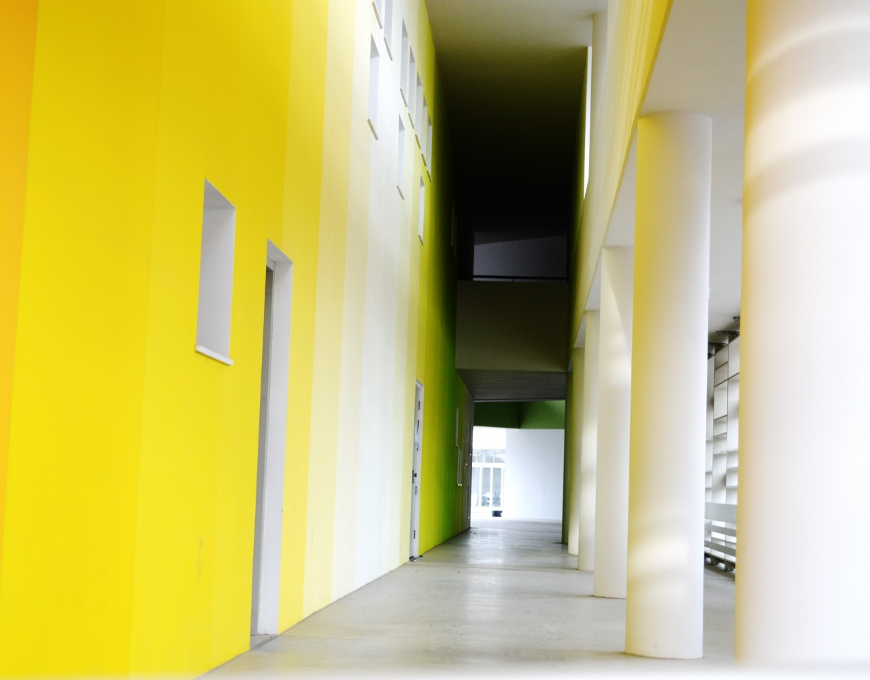

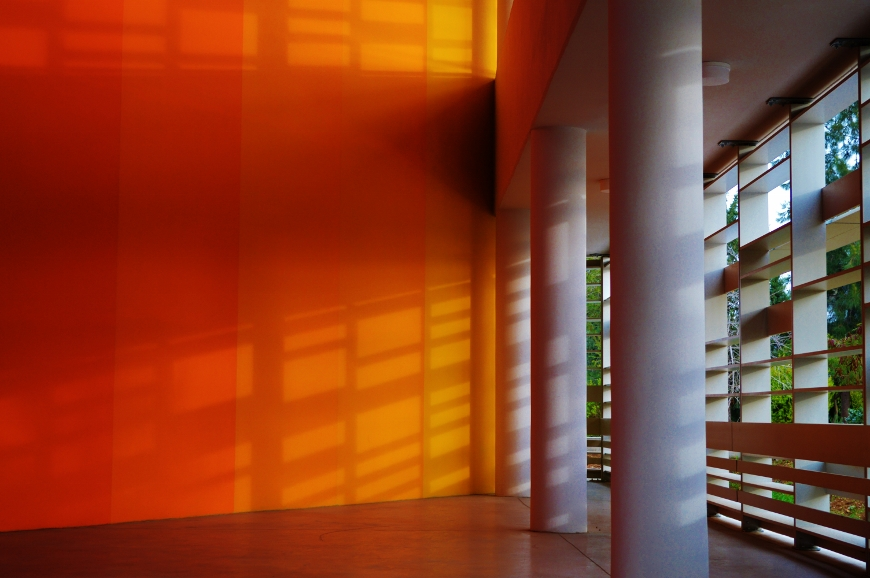

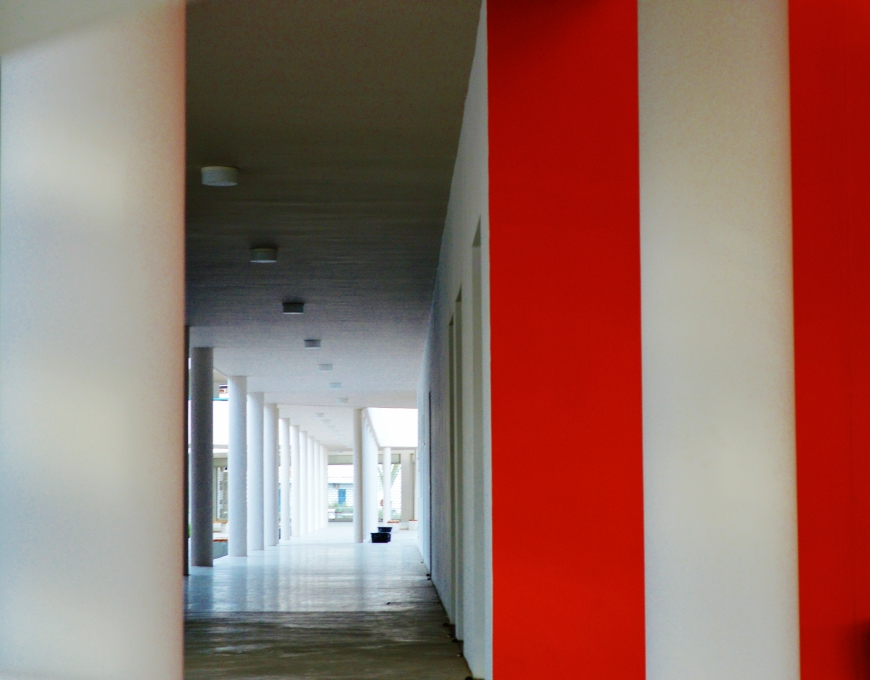

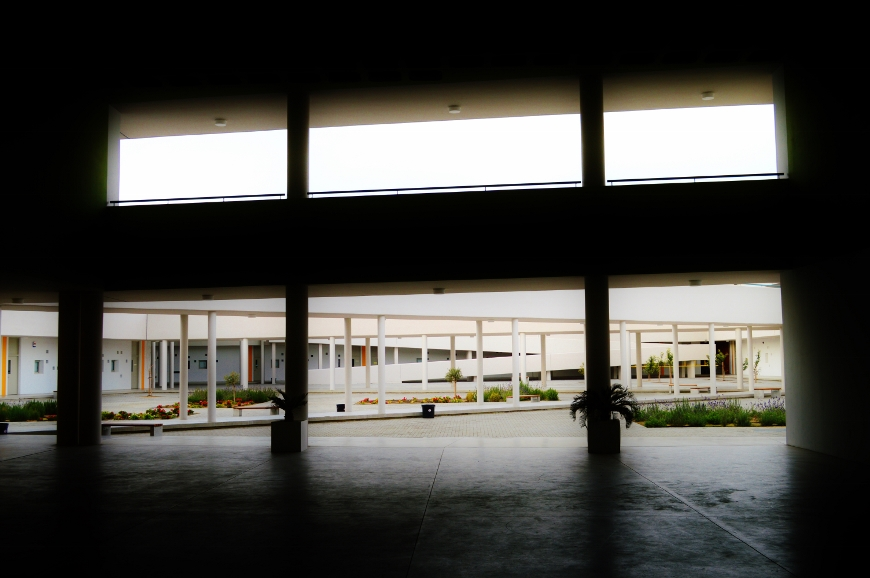

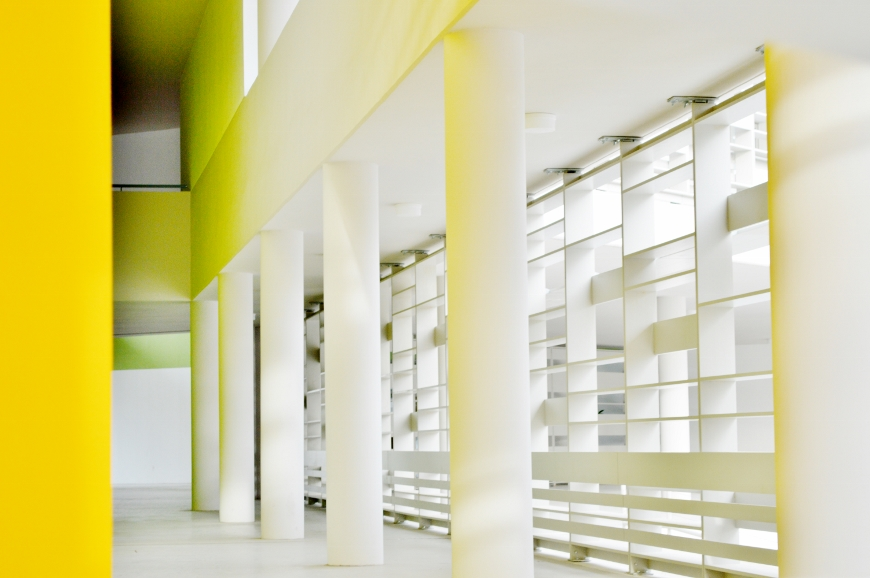

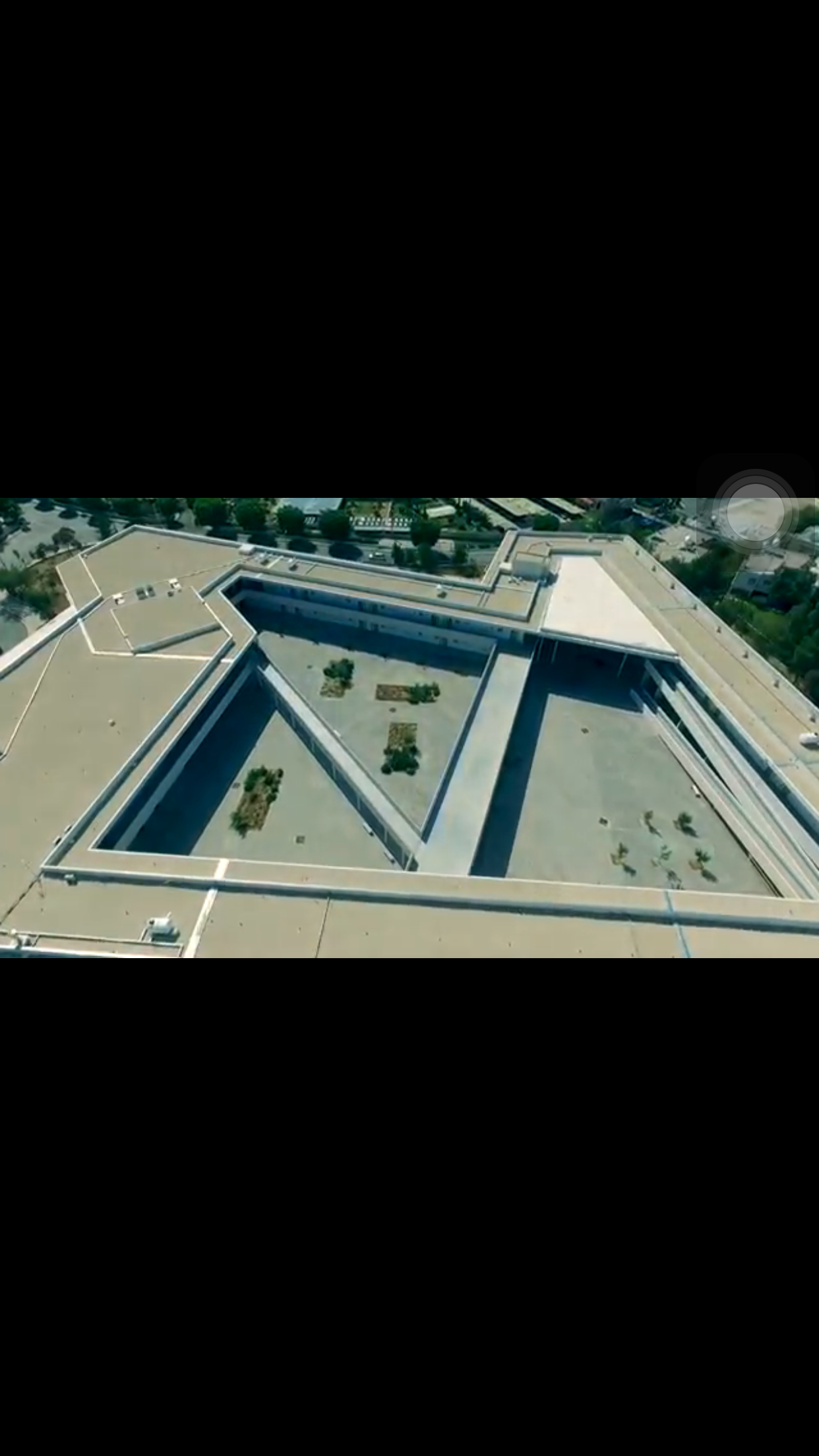
