= Royal Scottish National Orchestra =

Scotland's national symphony orchestra based in Glasgow

Royal Scottish National Orchestra (RSNO)
- Orchestra
- Official Royal Scottish National Orchestra logo
- Former name: Scottish Orchestra; Scottish National Orchestra; Royal Scottish Orchestra
- Founded: 1891
- Location: Glasgow, Scotland
- Principal conductor: Thomas Søndergård
- Website: www.rsno.org.uk

The Royal Scottish National Orchestra (RSNO) (Scottish Gaelic: Orcastra Nàiseanta Rìoghail na h-Alba) is a Scottish orchestra, based in Glasgow. It is one of the five national performing arts companies of Scotland. Throughout its history, the Orchestra has played an important part in Scotland's musical life, including performing at the opening ceremony of the Scottish Parliament building in 2004.

Its music centre and rehearsal studios are directly connected to the Glasgow Royal Concert Hall. The RSNO performs throughout Scotland, at such venues as Glasgow Royal Concert Hall, Usher Hall, Caird Hall, Aberdeen Music Hall, Perth Concert Hall and Eden Court Theatre. Thomas Søndergård is the orchestra's current music director, since 2018, and scheduled to conclude in 2026. Giedrė Šlekytė is the orchestra's music director-designate, scheduled to take effect in the autumn of 2027.

== History ==
The precursor ensemble to the RSNO was established in 1843 to accompany the Glasgow Choral Union (today known as the RSNO Chorus). In 1891, the orchestra was recognised formally as the 'Scottish Orchestra', with George Henschel as the ensemble's first principal conductor under that name. In 1950, the orchestra took the name of the 'Scottish National Orchestra'. The orchestra received royal patronage in 1977, one of only three British orchestras to do so, after the Royal Philharmonic and the Royal Liverpool Philharmonic. The orchestra continued to use the name 'Scottish National Orchestra' until 1991, when it changed to its present name (although during 1992, it briefly changed to the title 'Royal Scottish Orchestra' before taking its current name).

The orchestra's longest-serving principal conductor was Sir Alexander Gibson, the first Scot to be its principal conductor and musical director, from 1959 to 1984. Gibson pioneered overseas tours by the Orchestra, the SNO Junior Chorus and by Scottish Opera. He also became honorary president of the Royal Conservatoire of Scotland. During Gibson's tenure, beginning in 1979, the RSNO's base was at Henry Wood Hall in Glasgow and this space was also used as its recording venue. Previously, also during Gibson's tenure, the RNSO was based at St Andrew's Hall, also in Glasgow; this building was destroyed in a fire on 26 October 1962. Gibson was particularly noted for his interpretations of Scandinavian composers, notably Jean Sibelius and Carl Nielsen. His successor, Neeme Järvi, continued this tradition, and also led the orchestra through its first complete Gustav Mahler cycle. Principal conductor from 1984 to 1988, Järvi currently has the title of conductor laureate with the RSNO. Bryden Thomson, the orchestra's second Scottish principal conductor, maintained the Nordic link with a cycle of Nielsen symphonies.

Alexander Lazarev was principal conductor of the RSNO from 1997 to 2005, and now has the title of conductor emeritus with the RSNO. Marin Alsop was the RSNO's principal guest conductor from 2000 to 2003, the first woman to hold the title. Garry Walker succeeded Alsop as principal guest conductor, serving from 2003 to 2007. Stéphane Denève was music director of the RSNO from 2005 to 2012. During his tenure, the RSNO recorded music of Debussy and of Albert Roussel, the latter for Naxos Records.

In January 2011, the RSNO announced the appointment of Peter Oundjian as its next music director, as of the 2012–2013 season, with an initial contract of 4 years. In October 2011, Thomas Søndergård was named the orchestra's principal guest conductor, as of the 2012–2013 season, with an initial contract of 3 years for 3 programmes per year. In 2015, the orchestra took up new residence at the RSNO Centre and Glasgow Royal Concert Hall. Oundjian concluded his tenure as RSNO music director after the close of the 2017–2018 season.

In May 2017, the RSNO announced the appointment of Søndergård as its next music director, effective with the 2018–2019 season. In February 2021, the RSNO announced the extension of Søndergård's contract as music director through autumn 2024. In April 2023, the RSNO announced a one-year extension of Søndergård's contract as music director through the 2024-2025 season. Søndergård is scheduled to conclude his tenure as RSNO music director at the close of the 2026-2027 season and subsequently to take the title of music director emeritus.

In June 2017, the RSNO appointed Elim Chan as its principal guest conductor, effective 2018, following her first guest-conducting appearance with the RSNO in January 2017 and a return engagement a fortnight later as an emergency substitute for Neeme Järvi. In 2022, Patrick Hahn first guest-conducted the RSNO as an emergency substitute conductor. Chan concluded her tenure as principal guest conductor of the RSNO in March 2023. In March 2024, the RSNO announced the appointment of Hahn as its next principal guest conductor, effective with the 2024–2025 season.

In December 2018, the RSNO announced the appointment of Alistair Mackie as its next chief executive, effective April 2019.

In December 2025, Giedrė Šlekytė first guest-conducted the RSNO. She returned for recording sessions with the orchestra in 2026. In May 2026, the RSNO announced the appointment of Šlekytė as its next music director, effective with the 2027-2028 season. She took the title of RSNO music director-designate with immediate effect. Šlekytė is the first female conductor to be named music director of the Royal Scottish National Orchestra.

== RSNO Chorus and RSNO Junior Chorus ==
The affiliated choruses of the RSNO are the RSNO Chorus and the RSNO Junior Chorus. The RSNO Chorus evolved from a choir formed in 1843 to sing the first full performance of Handel's Messiah in Scotland, in April 1844. In addition to its commitment to the RSNO, the Chorus performs independently and has toured worldwide. The current chorus director is Stephen Doughty.

In 1978, Jean Kidd formed the RSNO Junior Chorus. In 1994 its director became Christopher Bell and then in 2018 it changed to Patrick Barrett. The RSNO Junior Chorus has a membership of around 400 singers, aged from eight to eighteen. The members learn to sing using the Kodály method.

== Recordings ==
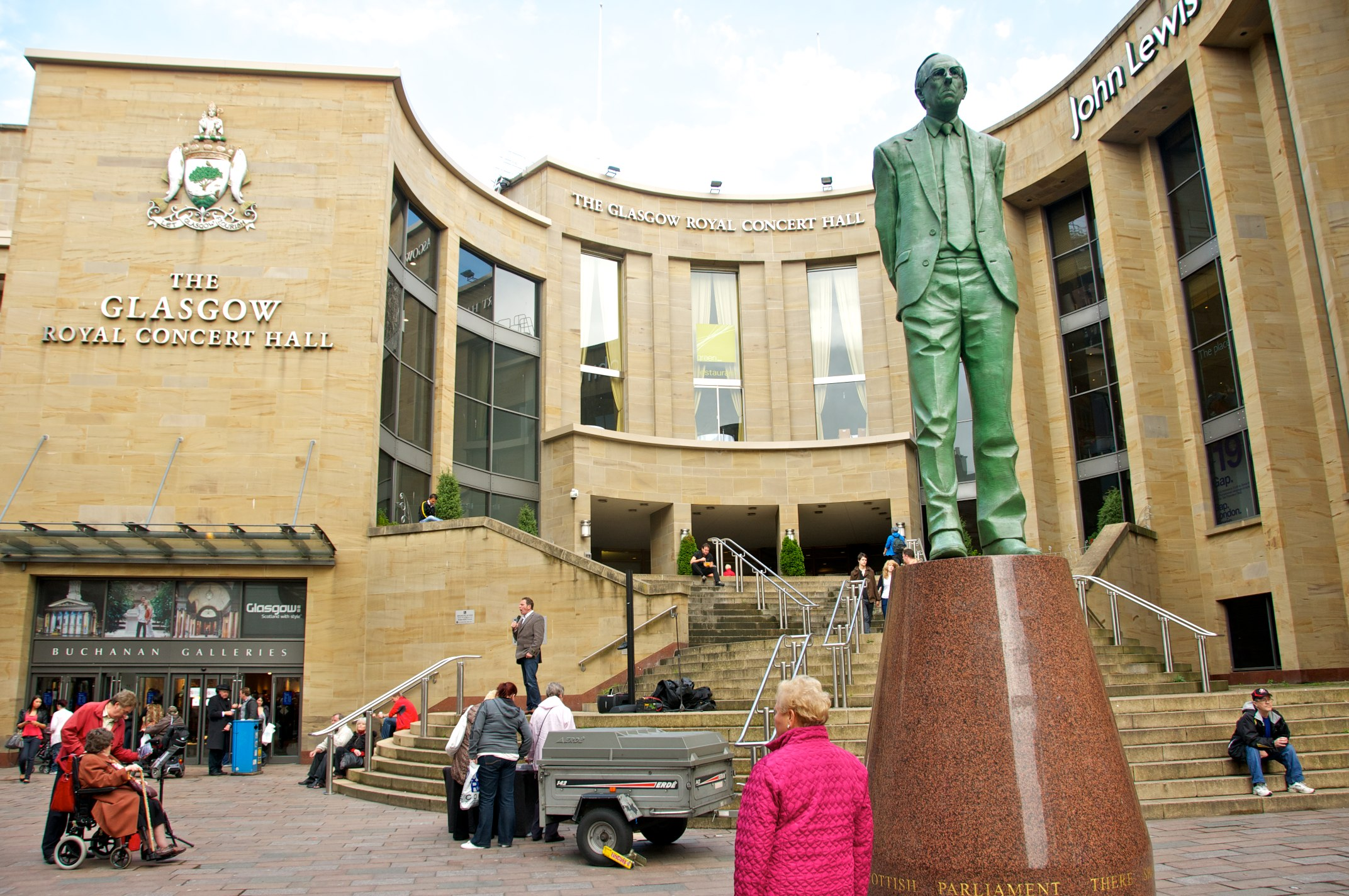
Glasgow Royal Concert Hall

The orchestra has had a long-standing recording contract with Chandos Records, particularly in the 1980s and 1990s. The RSNO has also recorded for Naxos Records, most notably in a cycle of Anton Bruckner symphonies with Georg Tintner, cycles of Arnold Bax symphonies with David Lloyd-Jones, and several recordings of American works (including the complete orchestral works of Samuel Barber) conducted by Marin Alsop. With Denève, their first Roussel recording received the Diapason d'Or de l'année for Symphonic Music. The second disc in the series was released in 2008.

== Principal conductors ==
- George Henschel (1893–1895)
- Willem Kes (1895–1898)
- Wilhelm Bruch (1898–1900)
- Frederic Cowen (1900–1910)
- Emil Młynarski (1910–1916)
- Landon Ronald (1919–1923)
- Václav Talich (1926–1927)
- Vladimir Golschmann (1928–1930)
- John Barbirolli (1933–1936)
- George Szell (1937–1939)
- Warwick Braithwaite (1940–1946)
- Walter Susskind (1946–1952)
- Karl Rankl (1952–1957)
- Hans Swarowsky (1957–1959)
- Alexander Gibson (1959–1984)
- Neeme Järvi (1984–1988)
- Bryden Thomson (1988–1990)
- Walter Weller (1992–1997)
- Alexander Lazarev (1997–2005)
- Stéphane Denève (2005–2012)
- Peter Oundjian (2012–2018)
- Thomas Søndergård (2018–present)
- Giedrė Šlekytė (designate, effective autumn 2027)

== Popular culture ==
Author Jilly Cooper shadowed the orchestra and joined them on two international tours as part of her research for her novel Appassionata.

== Sources ==
- Playing for Scotland: History of the Royal Scottish Orchestra; author Conrad Wilson, published by Collins, 1993.
