= Strovolos =

Municipality in Nicosia District, Cyprus

Strovolos: Στρόβολος (Greek); Strovolos (Turkish)
- Municipality
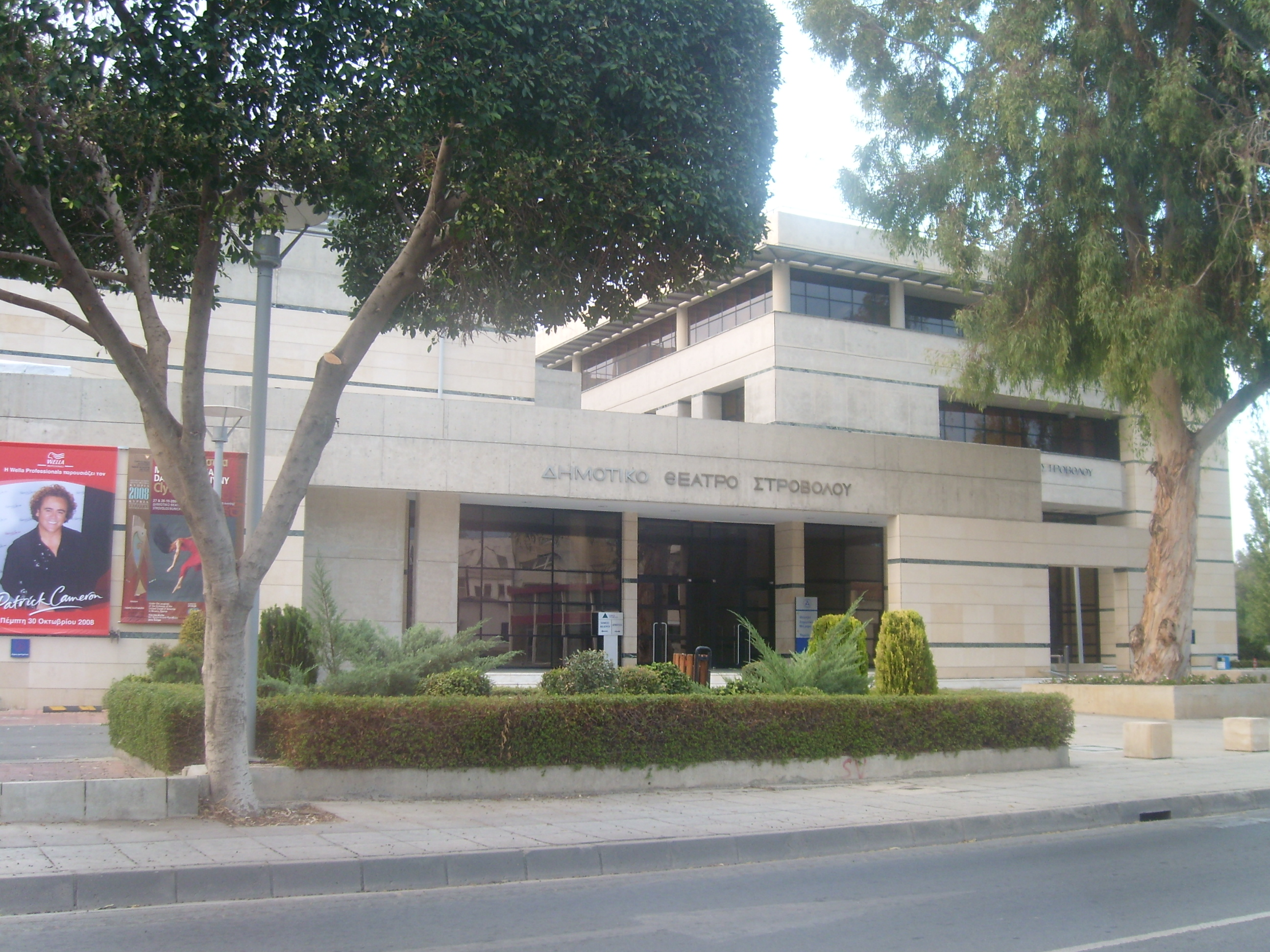
- The Municipal Theatre with the Town Hall in the background

- Flag
- Interactive map of Strovolos
- Location within Cyprus Location within the Eastern Mediterranean Location within the European Union Location within Asia
- Coordinates: 35.144001549896814°N 33.343571034625°E
- Country: Cyprus
- District: Nicosia District
- Urban area: Nicosia

Government
  - Mayor: Stavros Stavrinides

Area
  - Municipality: 25.29 km^{2} (9.76 sq mi)

Population (2021)
  - Municipality: 71,123
  - Rank: 2nd municipality in Cyprus, 1st municipality in Nicosia
  - Density: 2,812/km^{2} (7,284/sq mi)
- Time zone: UTC+2 (EET)
  - Summer (DST): UTC+3 (EEST)
- Website: strovolos.org.cy

Strovolos (Greek: Στρόβολος; Turkish: Strovolos; is a municipality in the Nicosia district, of Cyprus. It is a part of the Nicosia urban area. With a population of 71,123, it is the second most populated municipality in Cyprus, after Limassol, and the most populated municipality in the Nicosia District. It was established in 1986.

Strovolos covers approximately 25 square kilometres (9.7 sq mi), and is divided into six quarters: Apostolos Varnavas kai Ayios Makarios, Ayios Demetrios, Ayios Vasilios, Chryseleousa, Ethnomaryras Kyprianos, and Stavros.

== History ==
The name Strovolos is said to originate from the Greek word "strovilos" (Στρόβιλος) as in "anemo-strovilos" which means whirlwind, twister or tornado. There are references to Strovolos as early as the Middle Ages from the well-known medieval chronicler Leontios Makhairas, and from Florius Boustronius a little later. According to these sources, Strovolos was a royal field during the years of Frankish Rule. A major and definitive figure in the history of Strovolos was the National Martyr, Archbishop Kyprianos, who before the 1821 Revolution in Greece, contributed greatly to the preservation of the Greek spirit and Christianity. The Ottomans hanged Archbishop Kyprianos and other high priests and dignitaries of Cyprus on 9 July 1821.

Strovolos evolved into its present form after the events of 1974, this led to the settlement of many Greek Cypriot refugees, from the north of the island, within the municipality.

The Chryseleousa parish was named after the Greek orthodox church of the same name that was built around the 12th Century.

=== Former mayors ===
Former Mayors of Strovolos
Year(s) served	Name of Mayor
1986-1996	Iosif Hadjiosif
1997-2012	Savvas Eliofotou
2012-2016	Dr Lazaros S. Savvides
2017-2024	Andreas Papacharalambous

== Municipal Theatre ==
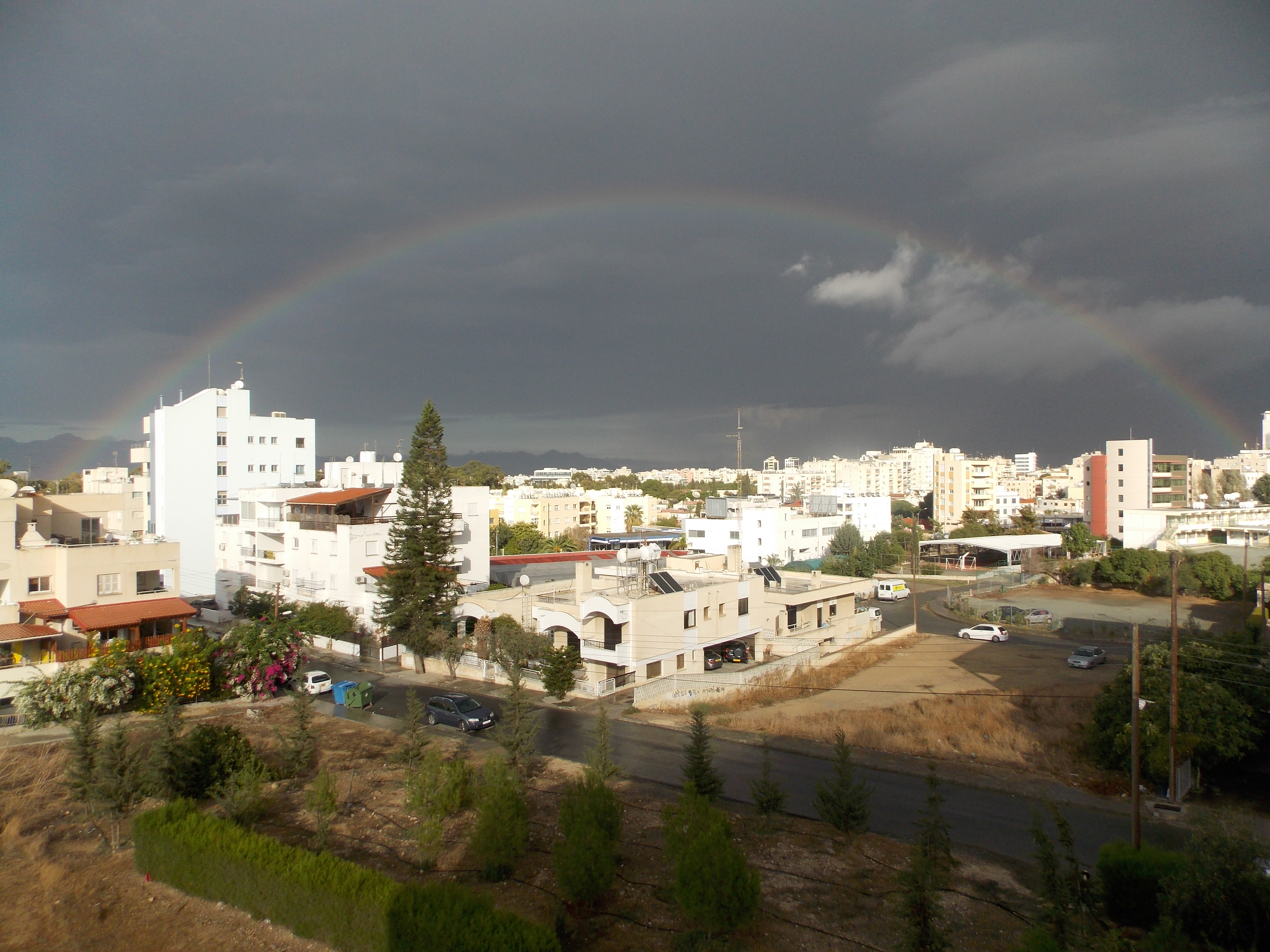
Rainbow over Strovolos

The Municipal Theatre and the Music Hall of the Municipality of Strovolos has been designed so as to host a broad amount of artistic activities such as concerts, operas, ballets, and theatre performances. Its size is for about 870 people including seats for people with special needs. This place has been designed with high standards. Particular attention has been paid to the study and implementation of the acoustic demands. Up to today the acoustic results have been proved to be very good according to the positive comments and the enthusiasm of the musical conductors, the soloists, and of the musicians who participated in several activities in the Hall.

In 2014 the busts of Vasilis Michaelides and Demetris Lipertis, which had been placed outside the theatre in 2013 were inaugurated at a ceremony which also celebrated El Greco. So a current photo in this article could update the existing one (this phrase should also change accordingly when the new photo is in place).

The whole set of buildings has a big reception place which is connected with the reception place of the Municipal Building, modern dressing rooms with hygienic places, a modern practice hall, a refreshment room for the artists, offices and storing places. It has the equipment that is necessary for the organization and attendance of performances.

For the development of athletics, an area for which the Municipality of Strovolos has a long tradition, the Municipality established the Municipal Athletic Centre in which, among other facilities, includes four futsal pitches, a mini football pitch, a running track and four tennis courts.

== Environment ==
In the area of Strovolos Municipality, 65 organized parks have been created as spaces for the entertainment of the citizens. More than 250 green places have been created, 340,000 m^{2} in total, while at the same time approximately 40,000 trees were planted in public areas, municipal parking lots and other areas. There are 32 organized green areas with amphitheatres, lakes, fountains and 65 playgrounds.

The biggest and best parks are those of Acropolis and Ayios Demetrios which are one of a kind. Both parks include fenced areas where dogs can move and exercise without a leash.

== Social policy and welfare ==
The Municipality of Strovolos has also played a pioneer role in other areas such as social services, with the establishment of a club for the elderly in which specialized people offer their care to the elder people. Youth clubs for the recreation and education of primary children have also been established. In addition, the Municipality of Strovolos has established a Counseling Center that offers free services on issues of mental health, addictive substances, marriage, family, etc. The Centre also organizes different activities for a financial support for those who suffer. On Christmas and New Year’s Day and at Easter, the Mayor and members of the Municipal Council visit charitable institutions of Strovolos and offer presents and sweets. In the area of health among other matters, a complete programme of preventive medicine has been put into action, for the students of primary and High Schools.

== Education ==
The municipality of Strovolos has several elementary schools, a gymnasium and Archbishop Makarios III Lyceum. There are two private schools in the area, the GC School of Careers and The English School.

== Sports ==
Strovolos is home to Keravnos B.C., former Cypriot basketball champion. The team plays its home games at the Costas Papaellinas Arena. It is also home to the biggest stadium in Cyprus, mainly used for football and track and field, the GSP Stadium, with a capacity of 22,859.

== International relations ==
=== Twin towns – sister cities ===
Strovolos is twinned with:

- Veria, Greece (since 1993)
- Pefki, Greece
- Bucharest, Romania
- Teramo, Italy (since 2010)
