= Santa Semeli and the Monks =

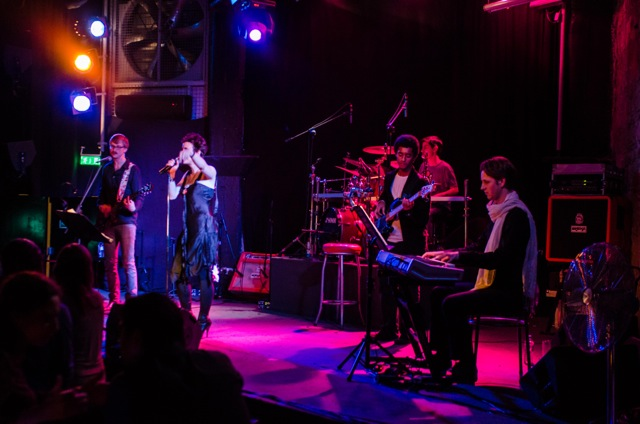
- Santa Semeli and the Monks performing 2014

Background information
- Origin: London
- Years active: 2014–present
- Labels: Cosima Music
- Website: www.santasemeliandthemonks.com

Santa Semeli and the Monks is a music group formed in London in 2014 by Semeli Economou and Haraldur Ágústsson. Semeli and Haraldur first met in 2012 when Semeli cast Haraldur in her short film The Burning Bush.

The name Santa Semeli and the Monks originated from Semeli's philosophy that religion should serve art. Monks symbolize dedication to a greater cause thus making music and art the priority. The group sees entertainment as the most beautiful and enjoyable way to convey messages.

In June 2014 Santa Semeli and the Monks released their first single ‘Arrivederci Bob’ under their label Cosima Music. The song reached number 3 in the Cyprus i-Tunes charts.

== Musical style ==
Santa Semeli and the Monks musical style has been described as visual and filmic whilst filled with sense of humour and brutal honesty that engages its audience.

All lyrics are based on Semeli Economou's poetry which sometimes has an improvisational nature.

Santa Semeli and the Monks work with all musical genres, putting the emphasis on good quality songwriting both musically and lyrically.

== Debut Album ==
In November 2014 SSATM released their self-titled debut album which is a collection of thirteen songs varying in style and genre. It comprises punk, rock n’roll, pop, folk, a sentimental Russian ballad, a Cuban tango, lullaby, blues, and easy listening. The album's main theme is the highs and lows of personal relationships.

The album was recorded and mixed in London by James Aparicio at Limehouse Studios and mastered by Tim Young at Metropolis Studios.

== Pants Off Tour ==
In October 2014 SSATM embarked on a small promotional tour. They played the Menil Fest in Paris, CBGB festival in New York, The Hamptons International Film Festival, in Cyprus and Reykjavik part of Iceland Airwaves. In Cyprus they performed live on Cypriot National Television on the cultural program Entexnos.

Santa Semeli and the Monks have collaborated with local musicians during their tour.

== Band members ==
- Semeli Economou – lead vocals
- Haraldur Ágústsson – guitar, backing vocals
- Gaspar Hunt - piano, keyboard
- Matt McCloud - drums
- Dion Palumbo - bass
