= Laniteio Lyceum =

Largest lyceum in Cyprus

- Λανίτειο Λύκειο
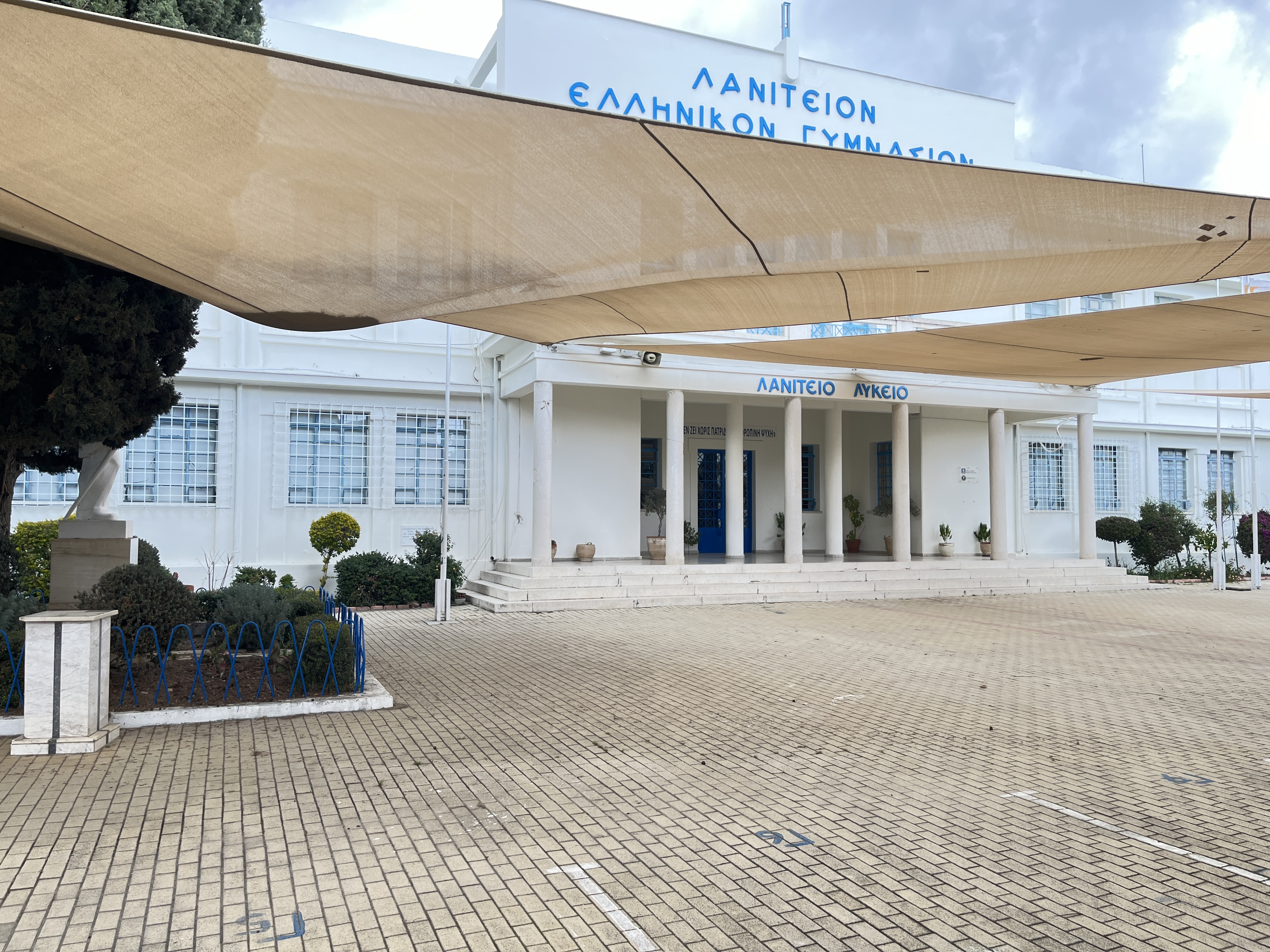
- Courtyard in-front of main entrance

Location
- Limassol, Cyprus
- 34°41′21″N 33°2′21″E

Information
- Former names: Greek School (1819-1951); Laniteion Greek School (1952-1985); Laniteio Lyceum A' (1985-2012)
- Type: Public lyceum
- Founded: 1819; 207 years ago
- School district: Limassol
- Principal: Myrto Pouagkare (current)
- Previous Principal: Giorgos Iosiphidis (2016-02/2022)
- Teaching staff: 139 (2024-2025)
- Secondary years taught: 10th through 12th grades
- Enrollment: 1121 (Laniteio Lyceum A': 487 + Laniteio Lyceum B': 634) (2012-2013)
- Language: Greek
- Website: Laniteio Lyceum

The Laniteio Lyceum (/lə.ˈnɪ.tɪ.oʊ/; Greek: Λανίτειο Λύκειο, romanized: Laníteio Lúkeio), founded in 1819 as the Greek School, is the largest lyceum in Cyprus and the oldest operational one in Limassol. It stands as the second oldest lyceum in Cyprus, after the Pancyprian Gymnasium, in Nicosia.

== History ==
In 1819, a group of residents of Limassol established the first one-year Greek School in the city, with the first principal being Demetrios Themistokleous (Greek: Δημήτρης Θεμιστοκλέους). The school's operation was paused in 1821, due to the Greek War of Independence, and later continued in 1834, as a three-year school.

From 1870 until 1913, Andreas Themistokleous (Greek: Ανδρέας Θεμιστοκλέους), son of the first principal, Demetrios Themistokleous, held the position of principal, being the first to include physical education at schools in Limassol.

In 1896, the building which housed the school was deemed inhabitable after an earthquake. With the help from the Greek Government, a new building was built. In 1906 the school was recognized as a five-year school, with energies from Andreas Themistokleous, and in 1915, a sixth year was added, giving it recognition of a six-year school, and the same status of any school in Greece.

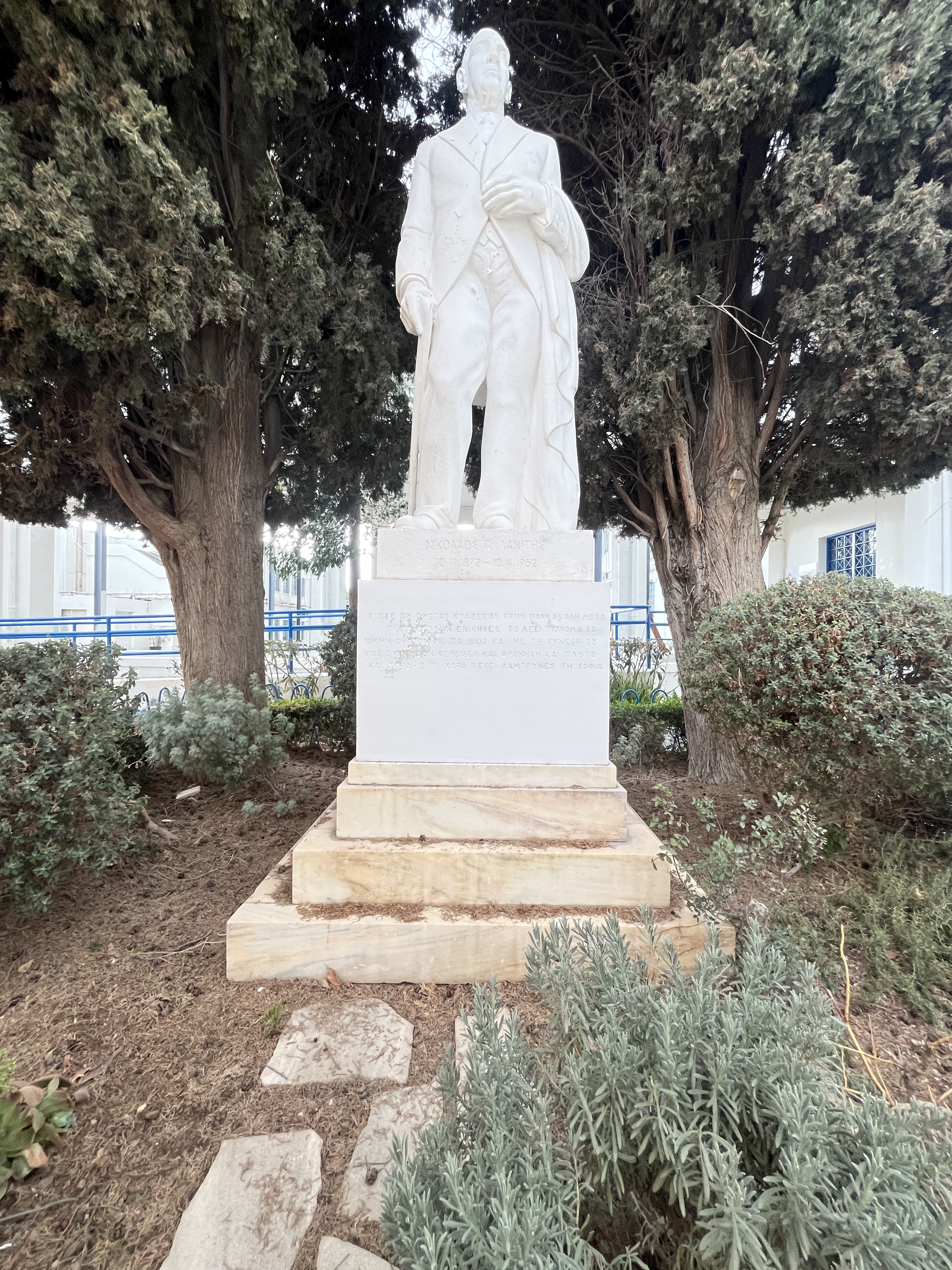
Statue in honor of Nicolas P. Lanitis in the school

In the early 1940s, the school appeared to have a housing-crisis, due to the rise of the number of students. In 1945, Nicolas P. Lanitis (Greek: Νικόλαος Π. Λανίτης), contributed largely in the construction of the current school building (which now houses the Laniteio Lyceum). And in 1952, the building was completed and the following school year, the school was renamed to Laniteion Greek Gymnasium (Greek: Λανίτειον Ελληνικόν Γυμνάσιον), being named after Nicolas P. Lanitis, for his contributions.

The school for the past two decades has played a big role ethnically in the city, and the island itself. In 1960, in the current Laniteio School Area, the Greek All-Girl Gymnasium of Limassol (Note: Greek: Ελληνικόν Γυμνάσιον Θήλεων Λεμεσού) began operating, separating administratively from the Laniteion Greek Gymnasium, and the following year, it was renamed to 1st All-Girls Gymnasium of Limassol (Note: Greek: Α´ Γυμνάσιο Θήλεων Λεμεσού), and finally, it was renamed to 5th Gymnasium of Limassol (Ayias Zonis) (Note: Greek: Ε´ Γυμνάσιο Λεμεσού (Αγίας Ζώνης)) in 1973, and it began accepting male students in 1974, due to the Turkish invasion of the island.

Following the events of 1974, and the ever-increasing number of students, the three-year 8th Gymnasium of Limassol (Note: Greek: Η΄ Γυμνάσιο Λεμεσού) operated in the school's area. While Laniteio, with the 5th Gymnasium of Limassol operated with morning and evening schedules for students.

During the reform of the educational system in the 1980s, the secondary education cycle was split into two, the Gymnasium (lower secondary) and Lyceum (upper) cycles, both being three years each. The Laniteio Gymnasium was established, while in 1984, the Laniteion Greek Gymnasium was renamed to Laniteio Lyceum A' (Note: Greek: Λανίτειο Λύκειο Α΄), while the 5th Gymnasium of Limassol was renamed to Laniteio Lyceum B' (Note: Greek: Λανίτειο Λύκειο Β΄) in 1986.

=== 21st century ===
In the 2006-2007 academic year, with the decision of the council of Ministers, approved by the Parliament, Athletic Schools and Music Schools (Lyceums) began operation in Limassol and Nicosia. The Athletic School of Limassol was housed in Laniteio Lyceum B', while the Music School of Limassol was housed in Laniteio Lyceum A'.

In the 2013–2014 school year, Laniteio Lyceum A' and Laniteio Lycem B' were unified into one school, forming the current Laniteio Lyceum, with the Athletic and Music schools also being a part of the new school. The same year, the Laniteio Gymnasium was rehoused in the old building of the Laniteio Lyceum B', with the previous building of the gymnasium being used as a part of the newly unified lyceum.

Laniteio Lyceum continues shaping education in Limassol, with the school participating in European Educational Programmes, including Erasmus+.

== School grounds ==
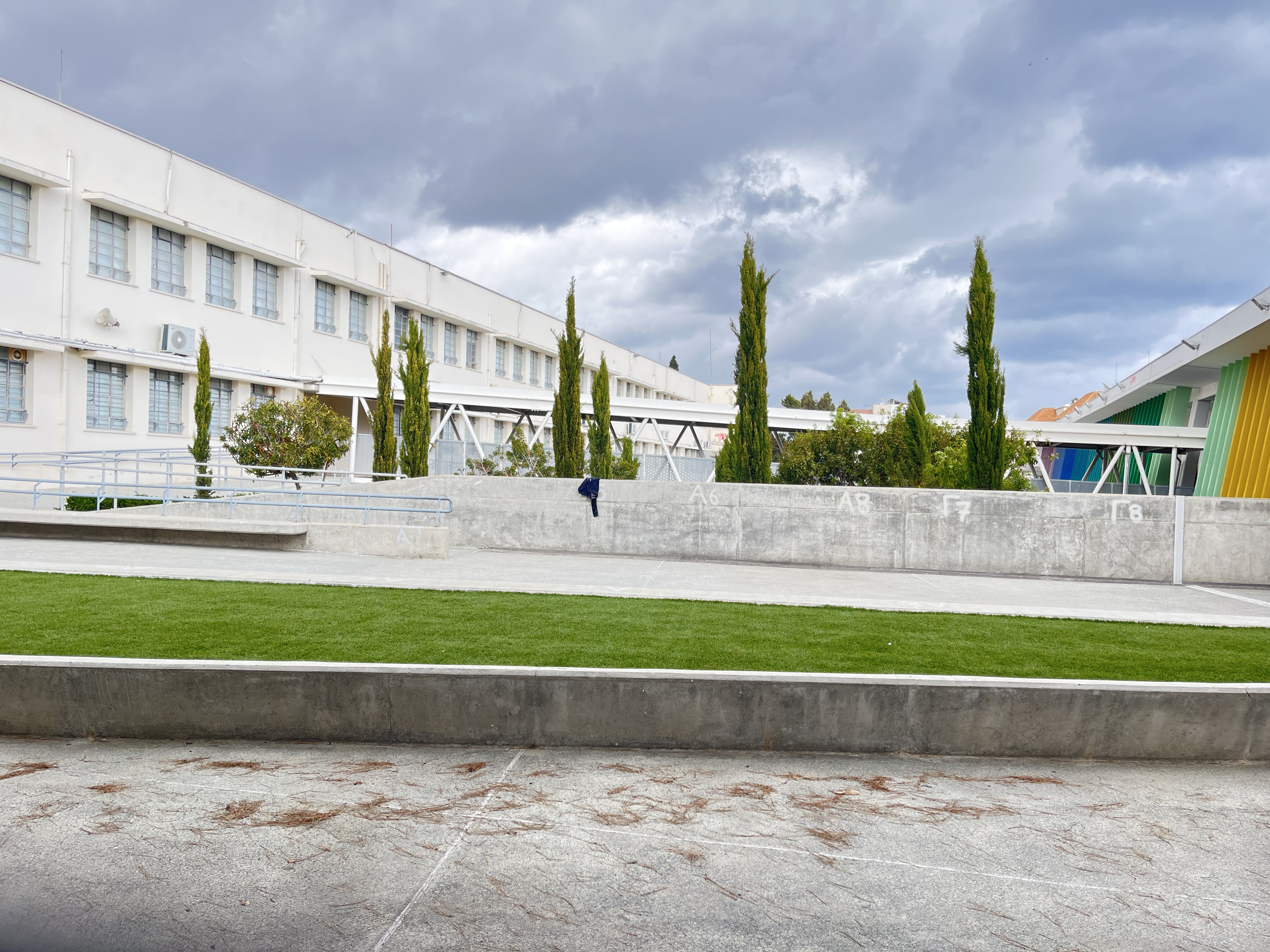
Laniteio Gymnasium

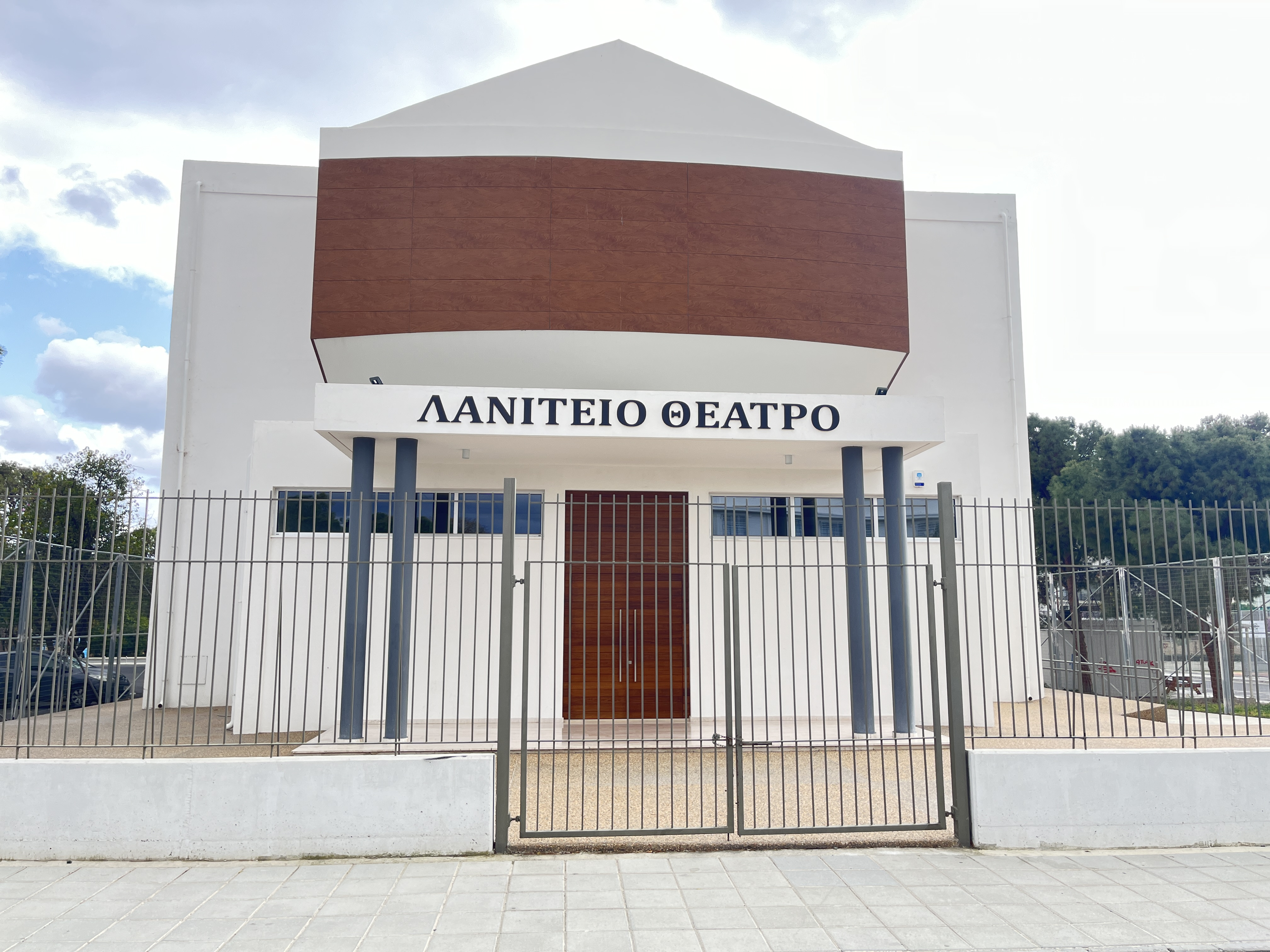
Laniteio Theatre

The Laniteio Lyceum is one of the schools located within the grander Laniteio School Area. The other main schools and facilities include:

- Limassol School Board
- Laniteio Stadium
- Laniteio Theatre
- Laniteio Lyceum (also housing the "Marios Tokas” Music Lyceum, the Limassol Athletic Lyceum, and the State Institute for Further Education of Limassol)
- Laniteio Gymnasium (also housing the Limassol Music Gymnasium and the Limassol Athletic Gymnasium)
- Laniteio Park
- 12th Primary School of Limassol - Laniteio

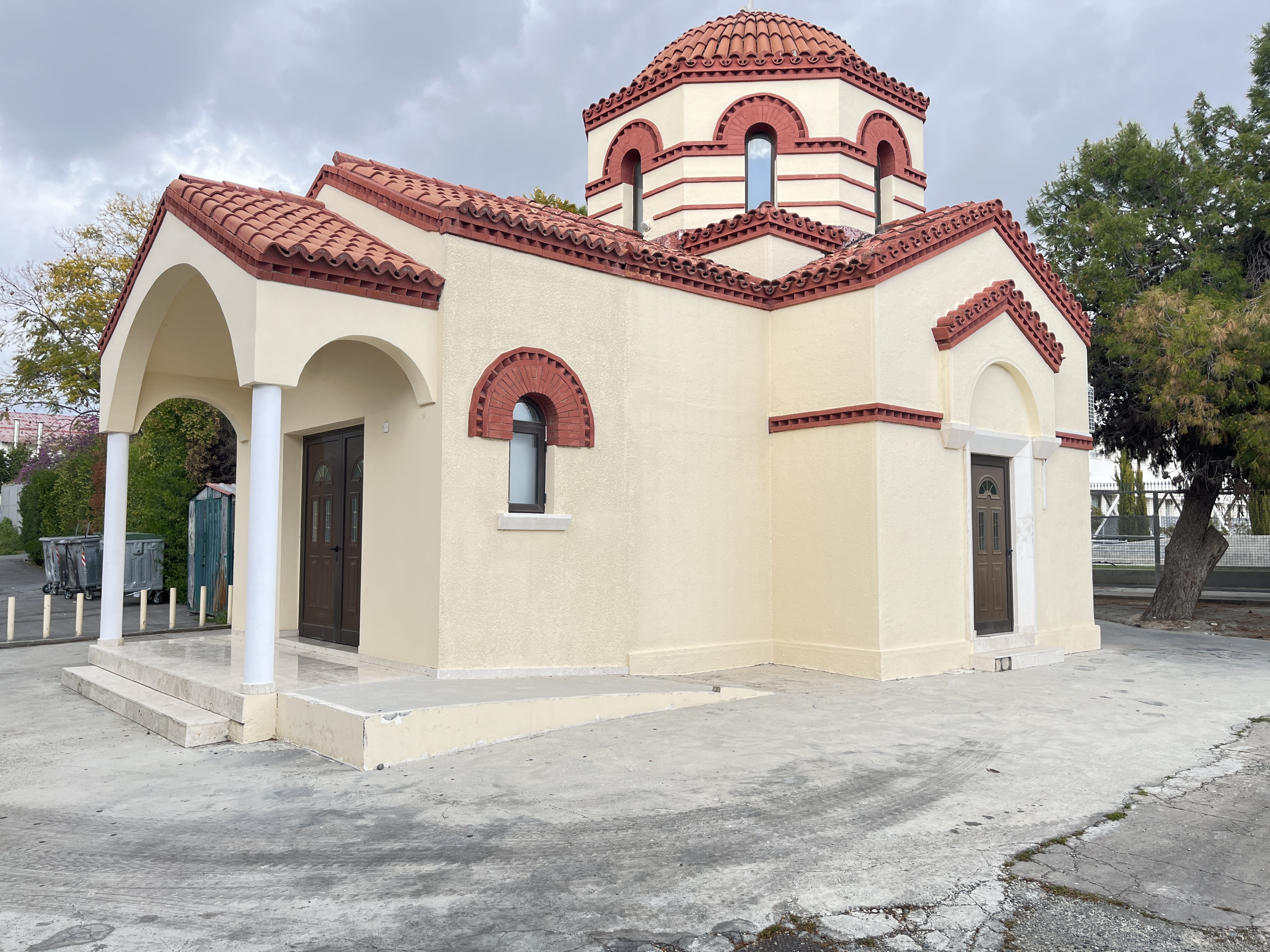
Church located on the grounds

A church, gardens, closed stadiums and smaller parks are also located within the school's area, open to the public.

== Notable people ==
Notable Laniteio alumni include:

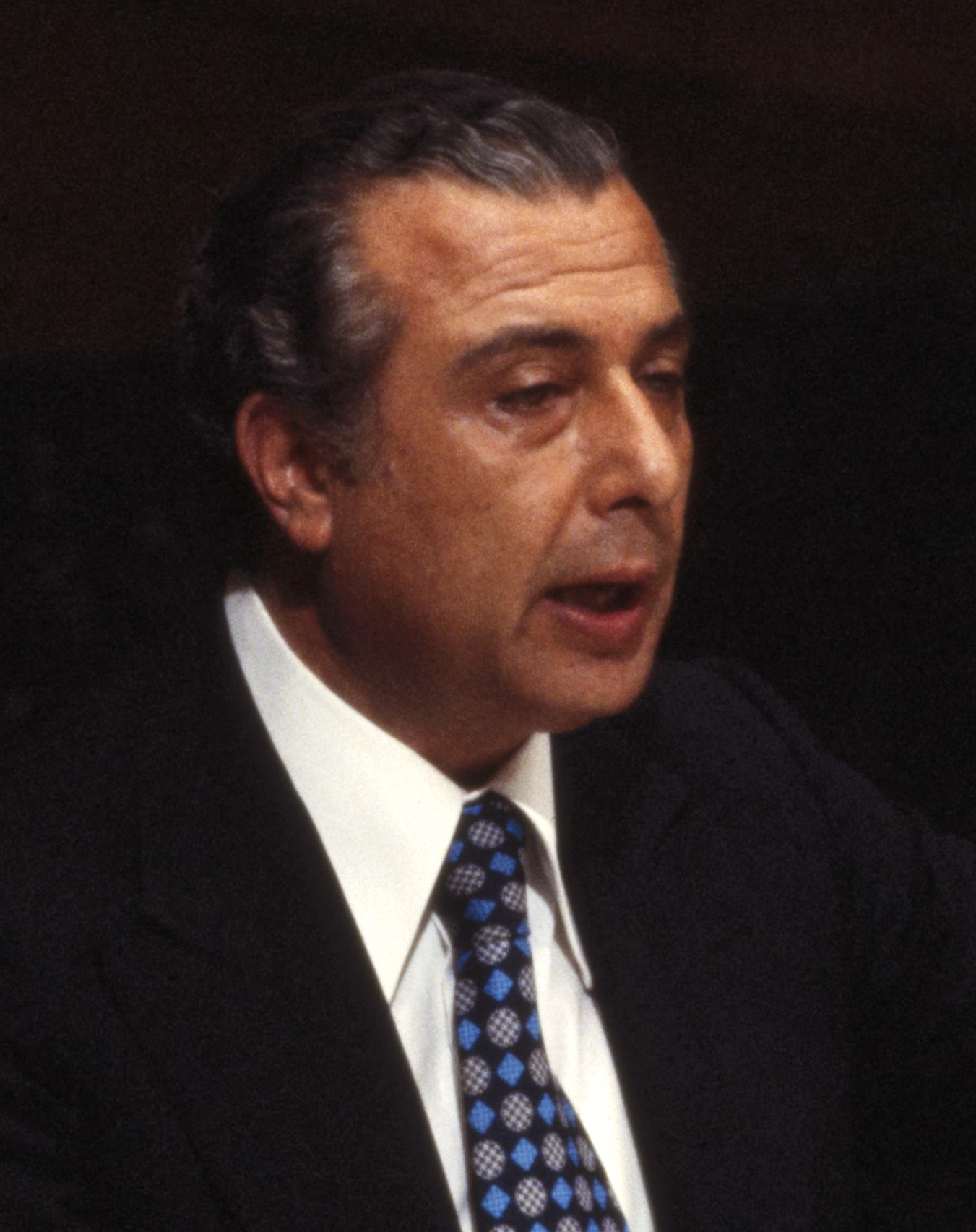
2nd President of Cyprus Spyros Kyprianou

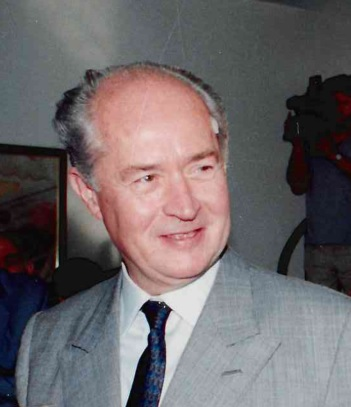
3rd President of Cyprus George Vassiliou

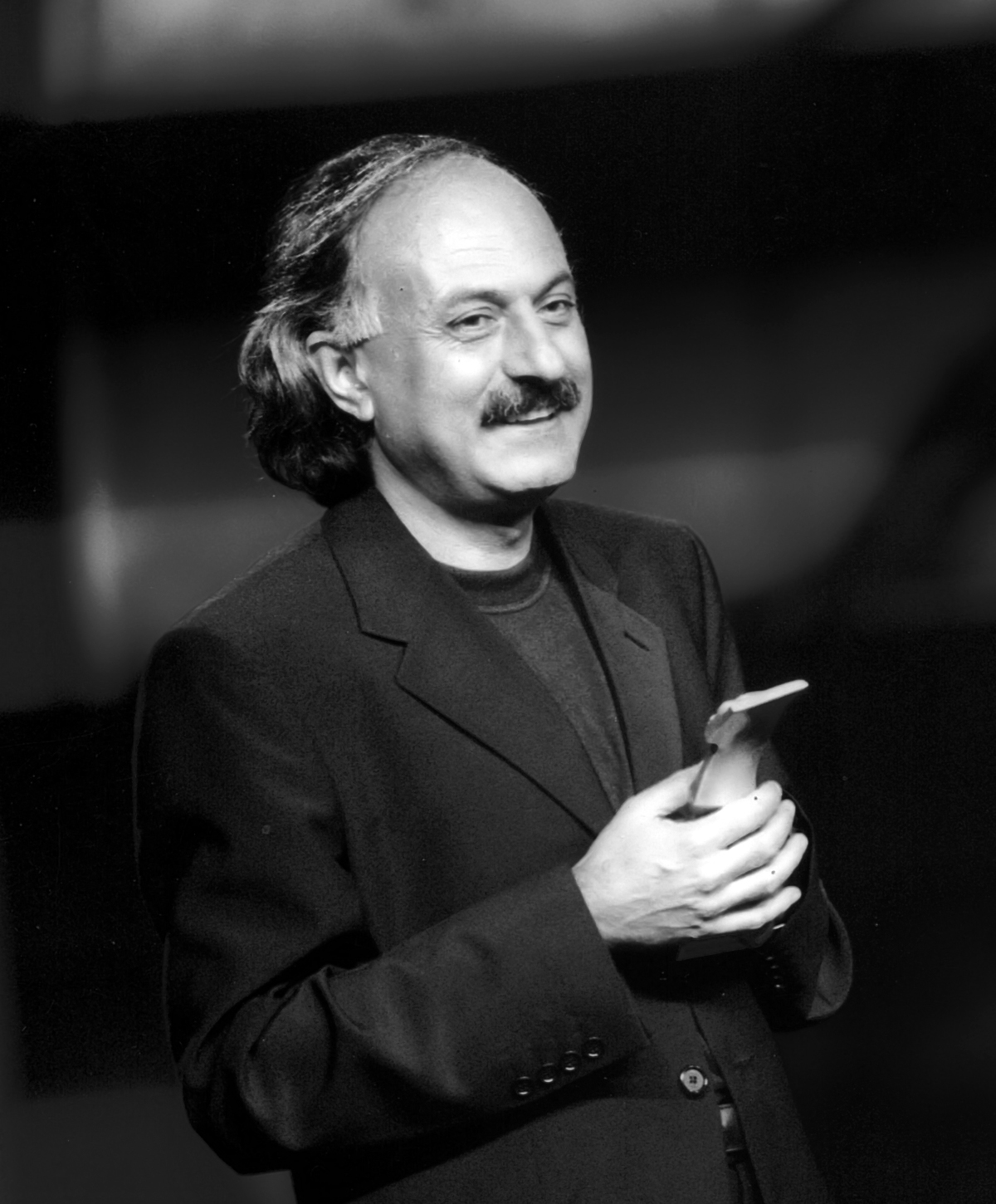
Composer Marios Tokas

== See also ==
- List of Laniteio people
- Laniteio Gymnasium
- Pancyprian Gymnasium
- Secondary education in Cyprus
