= Solon Michaelides =

Cypriot composer, teacher and musicologist

Solon Michaelides (12 November 1905 – 10 September 1979) was a Cypriot Greek composer, teacher and musicologist. He taught himself the guitar as a schoolkid. He was appointed guitar teacher in the Cypriot Conservatory, where he learned piano. He studied in the UK and France. After his studies he spend the next two decades in Limassol. He created a choir that survives today as Aris choir, with which he presented opera (Dido and Aeneas) and oratorio classics as well as choral works. He was a music teacher at Laniteio Lyceum. He moved to Salonika in the 1950s, where he continued teaching and created a symphony orchestra that was nationalised in the 1960s and is still active today. He wrote extensively, including books on the harmony of modern music, Cypriot music, modern Greek music and his Encyclopaedia of Ancient Greek Music. He composed several works for choir, orchestra and solo such as the archaic suite, Eleftheria etc. His archive was left to the municipality of Limassol where he spent his most creative years. There is a dedicated museum-archive building housing the archive next to the municipal conservatoire. Works by Michaelides have been recorded by Greek symphony orchestras. There is also a dedicated cd which is a live recording his works in concert with a combined choir of members of Aris and Foni tis Kerynias choirs, and the Cyprus symphony orchestra.

Solon's book, the Music of Ancient Greece: An Encyclopaedia, which was released in 1988, is cited and extracted in many scholarly works and books.
