= Secondary education in Cyprus =

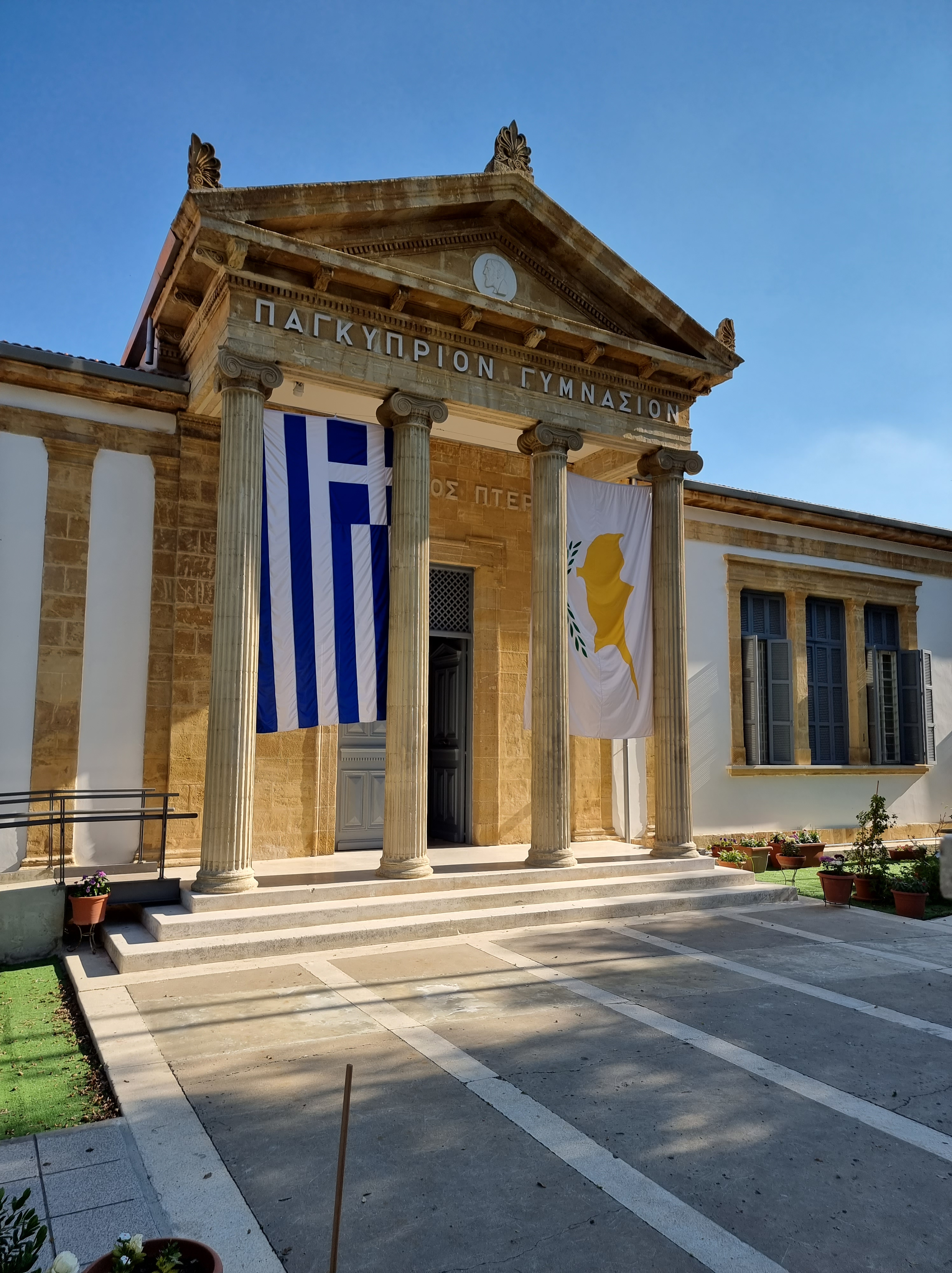
The Pancyprian Gymnasium, the oldest still operational high school in Cyprus, founded in 1812.

Secondary Education in Cyprus is part of the educational system of Cyprus which spans a six-year program designed for students aged 12 to 18. This educational phase is divided into two main cycles: the lower secondary and upper secondary cycles, aiming to develop students' intellectual, social, and personal skills, ensuring they are well-prepared for further education or entry into the workforce.

== The secondary education cycles ==
The Gymnasium Cycle (Γυμνασιακός Κύκλος) serves as the lower secondary level and includes grades 7 to 9, catering to students aged 12 to 15. This stage provides a broad general education and prepares students for the more specialized upper secondary level.

The Lyceum Cycle (Λυκειακός Κύκλος) is the upper secondary level, encompassing grades 10 to 12 for students aged 15 to 18. Students can choose either between general education at a Lyceum (Λύκειο) or technical/vocational education and training at a Technical and Vocational School of Education and Training (TVSET) (Τεχνική και Επαγγελματική Σχολή Εκπαίδευσης και Κατάρτισης (ΤΕΣΕΚ)). The curriculum at Lyceum focuses on preparing students for higher education, while at a TVSET the focus is on providing specialised education and training for specific careers.

Some schools (e.g. the Pancyprian Gymnasium) may offer both the Gymnasium and Lyceum cycles.

== Schedule ==
The school year begins in early September until late May, which is split into two semesters, with the first from the beginning of the school year until early January and the second from mid January until the end of the school year. Final exams take place after the end of the 2nd semester, around late May to early June. Classes are held from 07:30 until 13:35, Monday through Friday. Lesson periods are 45 minutes (on a 7-period day) and 40 minutes (on a 8-period day). There are three breaktimes per day, totalling to around 45–50 minutes everyday. In total, 38 lesson periods occur every week for gymnasium, and 37 for lyceum.

== Cyprus school uniform ==
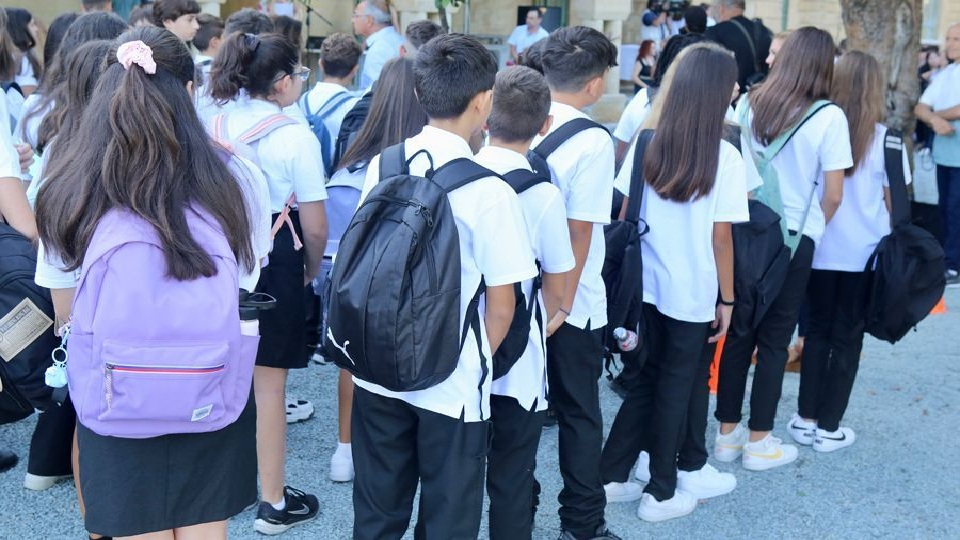
Casual everyday uniform in Cyprus public schools

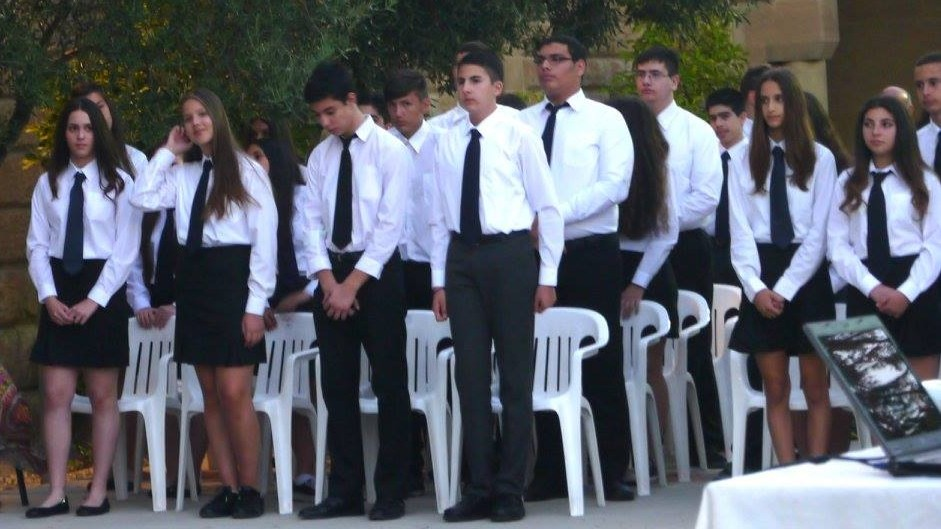
Formal Cyprus public School uniform

In Cyprus, due to its British colonial past, both public and private schools require students to wear a school uniform. In public primary and secondary schools, the standard uniform consists of a white shirt paired with dark-blue trousers, or a dark-blue skirt for girls. This uniform is worn on a daily basis, while a dark-blue tie is additionally required for special occasions such as celebrations, official events, or school parades.

== Lessons ==
=== Gymnasium ===
In Gymnasium, a total of 38 lesson periods are taught weekly. Physics and Chemistry are introduced in Grade 8, while Geography is taken away at Grade 9, for the rest of Secondary education.

Written examinations must be taken by all students at the end of each academic year. For Grade 7 the examined subjects are: Modern Greek and Mathematics. For Grades 8 and 9 the examined subjects are: Modern Greek (Νέα Ελληνικά), Mathematics (Μαθηματικά), History (Ιστορία) and Science (Φυσικά) which is itself composed of Physics, Chemistry and Biology.

Gymnasium lessons
Lesson	Number of periods by Grade		
Lesson	Grade 7	Grade 8	Grade 9
Modern Greek	5 E	5 E	6 E
Ancient Greek/Ancient Literature	4	4	4
Mathematics	5 E	4 E	4 E
Physics	0	2 E	2 E
Chemistry	0	1 E	1 E
Biology	2	1 E	2 E
Geography	1	1	0
History/History of Cyprus	2	2 E	3 E
English	3	3	2
French	2	2	2
Computers	2	2	2
Art	1	2	2
Music	2	2	1
Physical Education	3,5	3	3
Religious Studies	2	2	2
Design and Technology	1,5	1	1
Home Economy	2	1	1
TOTAL	38	38	38
E = examined subject

=== Lyceum ===
==== Grade 10 ====
In grade 10 (1st lyceum grade), students must choose 1 out of 4 available courses. Each course has 2 advanced subjects. At the end of grade 10, students are examined on modern Greek, 2 advanced and 1 common core subjects that come along their course. The course chosen in grade 10 determines the "direction" (course) the students are eligible to take in grades 11 and 12.

Grade 10
Lesson	Common structure periods	Examined subjects (E) and extra periods by course			
Lesson	Common structure periods	Course 1	Course 2	Course 3	Course 4
Modern Greek/Citizenship	6	E	E	E	E
Ancient Greek/Ancient Literature	2	E 2			
Mathematics	4	E	E 2	E 2	E
Physics	2		E 2		
Chemistry	2		E		
Biology	1		E		
History/History of Cyprus	2	E 2		E	
English	2				E 2
French	2				
Computers	2				
Art	1				
Music	1				
Physical Education/First-Aid	1,5				
Religious Studies	1,5				
Design and Technology	2				
Economics	1			E 2	E 2
TOTAL	33	4	4	4	4
GENERAL TOTAL	37				
Ref.					

Directions which can be chosen from each course:
Grade 10	Grades 11 and 12
Course	Directions which can be chosen
1	1. Classics and Humanities; 2. Foreign Language and European Studies; 6. Arts
2	3. Pure Sciences - IT - Technology; 6. Arts
3	4. Economic Sciences; 6. Arts
4	5. Trade and Services; 6. Arts
Ref.	

==== Grades 11 and 12 ====
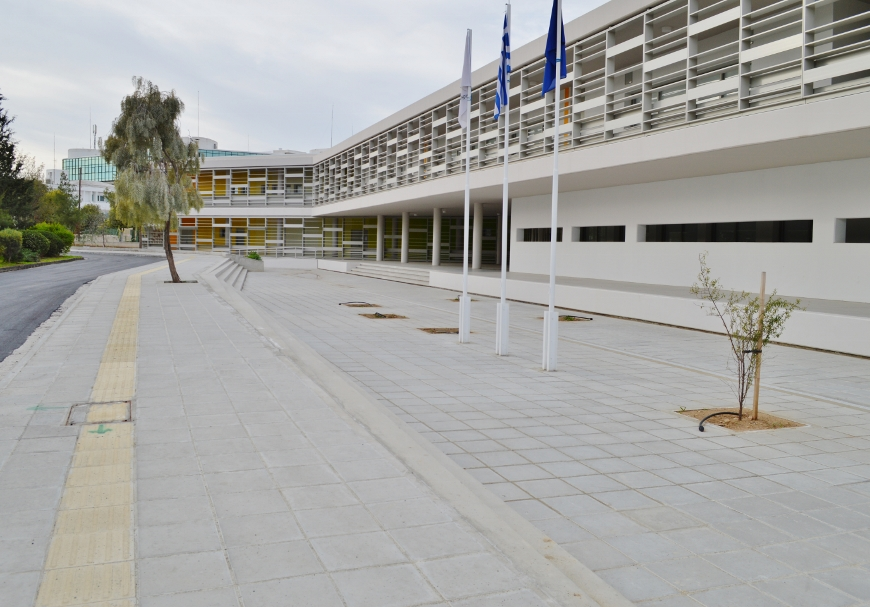
Archbishop Makarios III Lyceum in Nicosia

In grade 11, students must choose 1 out of 6 available "directions". To enter a specific direction, you must have taken the relevant exam(s) in the subject(s) which the direction requires. The exams you must have taken for each direction are already examined in the corresponding grade 10 courses. You have the ability to enter any grade 11 direction from any grade 10 course, though students may have to take extra exams if the direction you wish to follow is outside of the scope of the course you already followed. This system has been criticised for being flawed and harsh for students, as many will have to pay for private lessons to cover the subject they must be examined in to enter the direction they wish, since they hadn't done the relevant advanced lessons in their course.

In grade 12, students continue the direction they chose in grade 11, though the ability to change directions remains, so long they have taken the relevant exams in the subjects required.

== School holidays ==
See also Public holidays in Cyprus.

School holidays in secondary education are: 1 October, 28 October, the two-week period from 24 December to January 6 (winter break), 30 January, 25 March, 1 April, 1 May and 11 June.

Holidays with different dates every year are: Green Monday, the two-week period from Holy Monday to 2nd Sunday of Easter (spring break) and Monday of the Holy Spirit.

== Certification of secondary education ==
- Lyceum: An indicative certificate (for those who successfully pass grades 10 and/or 11) or a School Leaving Certificate (Apolytirion), for those who graduate, is awarded at the end of the school year to all successful students. The School Leaving Certificate is a qualification for employment in office work.
- Technical/Vocational Education: After successfully completing the program, students of TVE are awarded a School Leaving Certificate (Apolytirion), which is recognized as equivalent to a SLC of any lyceum.

== Action - Creativity - Social Contribution programme ==
The Programme "Action – Creativity – Social Contribution" (ACS) (Greek: Δράση – Δημιουργικότητα – Κοινωνική Προσφορά (ΔΔΚ)) is organized by the school and is approved by the Ministry of Education, Sport and Youth. The program is optional for all students, though a certificate of participation is given to all students at the end of every year. The activities that have been organized by schools so far, are now regulated, enriched and upgraded through this program.

== Uniforms ==
Uniforms are compulsory. The uniform is regulated by each school, thought most follow the following regulation:

- White, dark blue, grey or black shirts
- Jeans or trousers in the previous colours
- Sweatpants in the previous colours (PE only, or during colder months only)
- Skirts for females

== Costs ==
Secondary education in Cyprus is free for all students.

== Private lessons ==
Private lessons (Frontistiria), outside of school, are very common in Cyprus. Some students prepare for external exams, usually GCE A´ and O´ Levels through private tuition, to ensure access to foreign universities, especially in the UK. Many students, especially in Lyceum, take private lessons to aid for difficult subjects taught in school.

== Access to higher education ==
Access to Public Tertiary Institutions in Cyprus and Greece can be achieved through the National Entrance exams, while the School Leaving Certificate (Apolytirion) can ensure access to private tertiary institutions.

== See also ==
- Education in Cyprus
- List of schools in Cyprus
