= Marios Tokas =

Greek-Cypriot composer (born 1954)

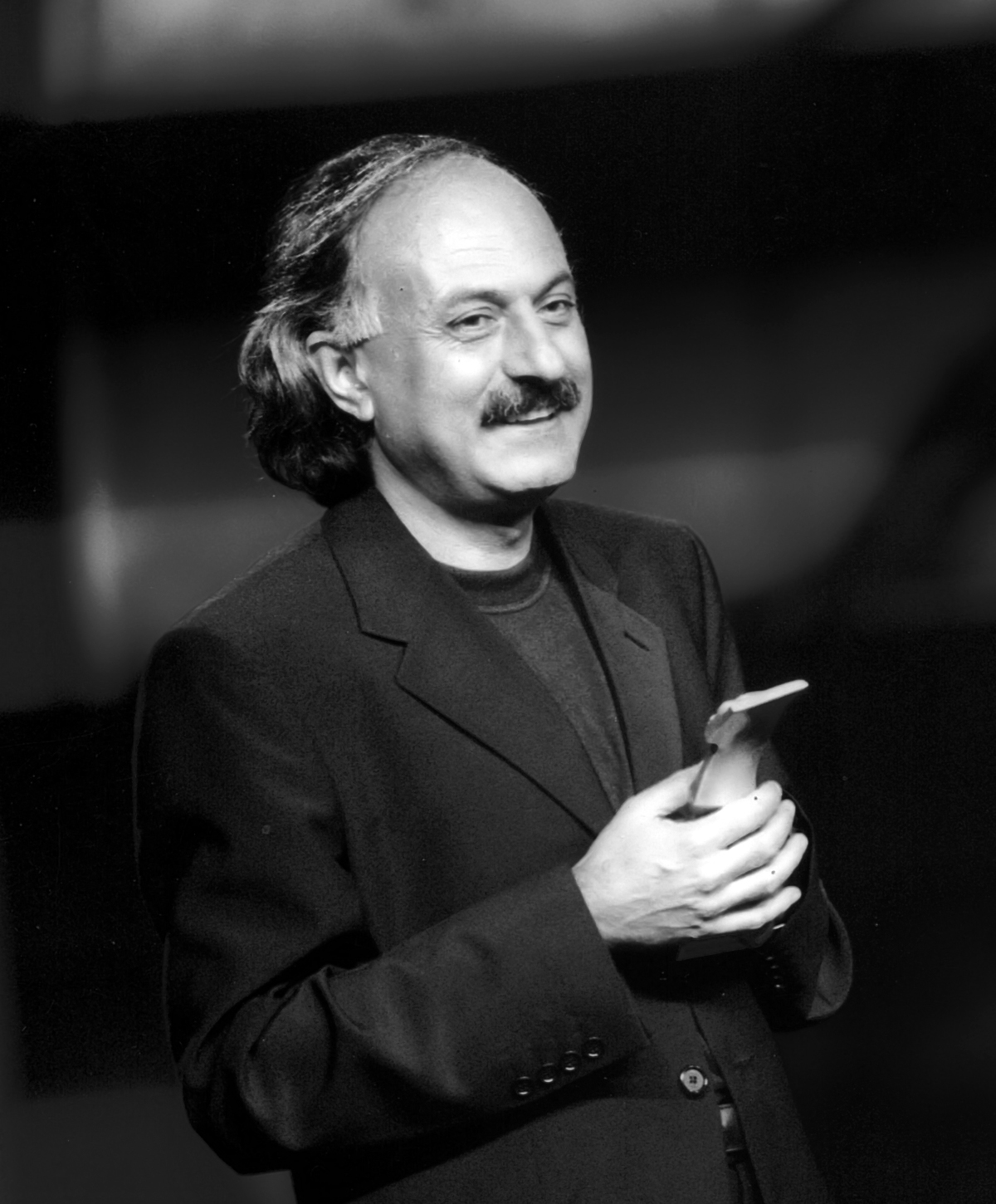
- Marios Tokas

Background information
- Born: 8 June 1954
- Origin: Limassol, Cyprus
- Died: 27 April 2008 (aged 53) Athens, Greece
- Occupation: Composer
- Instruments: Arxitselo, Piano, Guitar
- Years active: 1978–2008

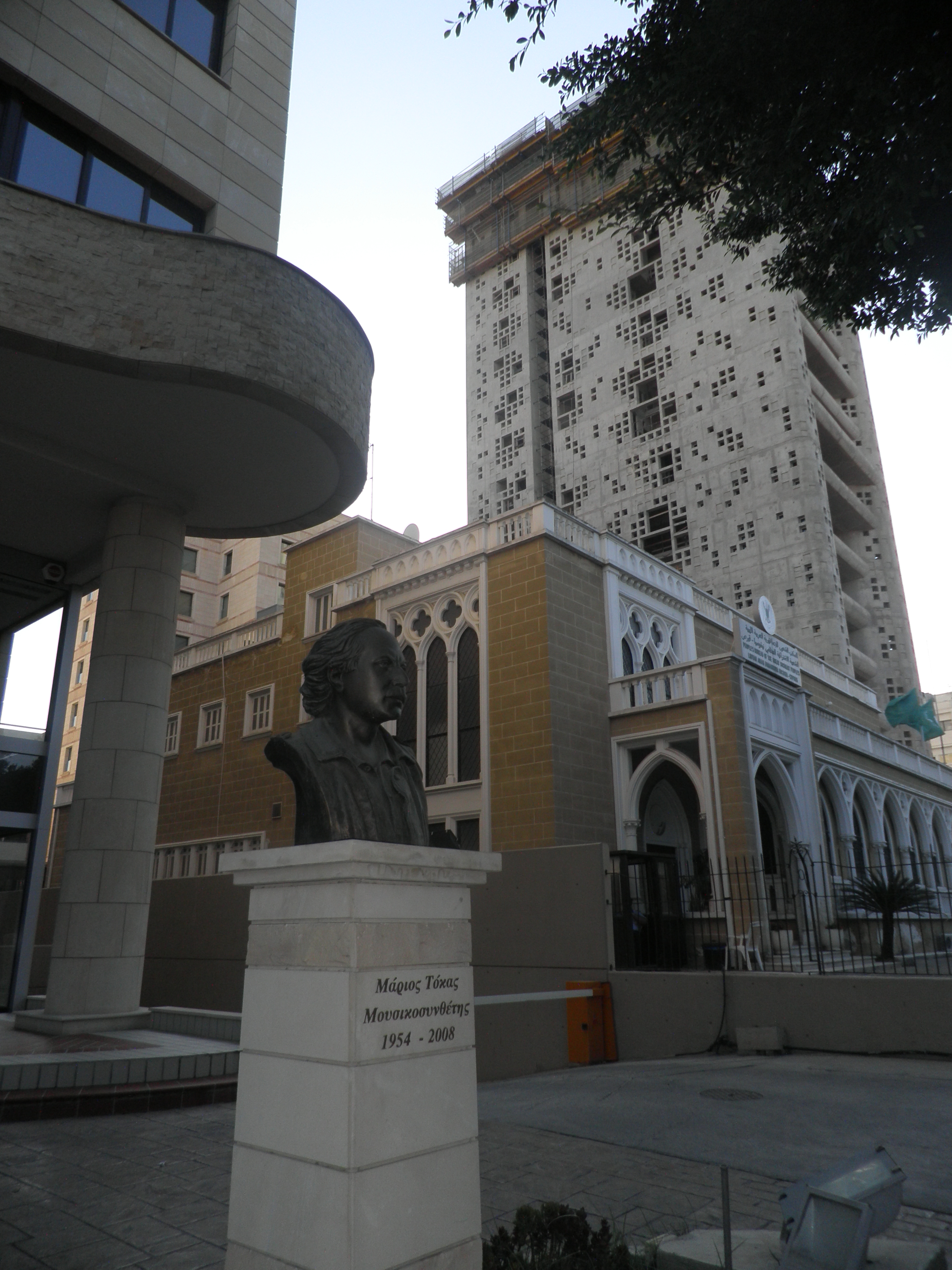
Bust of Marios Tokas, in Nicosia, Cyprus

Marios Tokas (Greek: Μάριος Τόκας) (8 June 1954 – 27 April 2008) was a Greek-Cypriot composer of traditional music born in Limassol, Cyprus. During the 1974 invasion, he fought as a soldier against the Turkish invaders. In 1975, he went to Athens in order to study in the philosophical school. At the same time, he studied in the Ethniko Odio because he wanted to start a career as a musician. In 2004, Tokas and his six-member orchestra gave a concert in Vienna. The concert was co-organised by the Greek Society of Austria and the Athens Sports Association "Pantalkis" with the support of the General Secretariat of Hellenism Abroad of the Greek Foreign Ministry, under the auspices of the Cypriot ambassador to Austria.

== Music school of Limassol "Marios Tokas" ==
The Music School of Limassol "Marios Tokas" (Greek: Μουσικό Σχολείο Λεμεσού «Μάριος Τόκας»), housed at Laniteio Lyceum, was named after him. It officially began operation in September 2006.

== Death ==
On 27 April 2008, Tokas died of cancer in Athens. Cypriot president Dimitris Christofias had visited him in the hospital towards the end of his life. He was buried in First Cemetery of Athens.

He is regarded by some as the most prominent composer in Cyprus and Greece. M. Tokas may be remembered for his passion for Cyprus and the connection of his music with Cyprus.
