= Manolis Rasoulis =

Background information
- Born: 28 September 1945; Heraklion, Greece
- Died: 5 March 2011 (aged 65) Thessaloniki, Greece
- Genres: Éntekhno
- Occupation(s): Lyricist, songwriter, singer, journalist
- Website: www.rasoulis.gr/english/index.html

Manolis Rasoulis (Greek: Μανώλης Ρασούλης; 28 September 1945 – 5 March 2011), best known as the lyricist of famous songs, was a Greek music composer, singer, writer, and journalist. He is often regarded as one of the Greek lyricists of exceptional talent.

Rasoulis was born in 1945 in Heraklion, Crete. He frequently collaborated with famous musicians such as Manos Loizos, Stavros Kougioumtzis, Nikos Xydakis, and Christos Nikolopoulos, and singers such as Vasilis Papakonstantinou, Haris Alexiou, Sokratis Malamas, and Nikos Papazoglou.

He was found dead in his apartment in the Toumba area of Thessaloniki on 13 March 2011 at the age of 65. His death is estimated to have occurred more than a week earlier, on 5 March, from a suspected heart attack.
