= Haris Alexiou =

Greek singer and actress (born 1950)

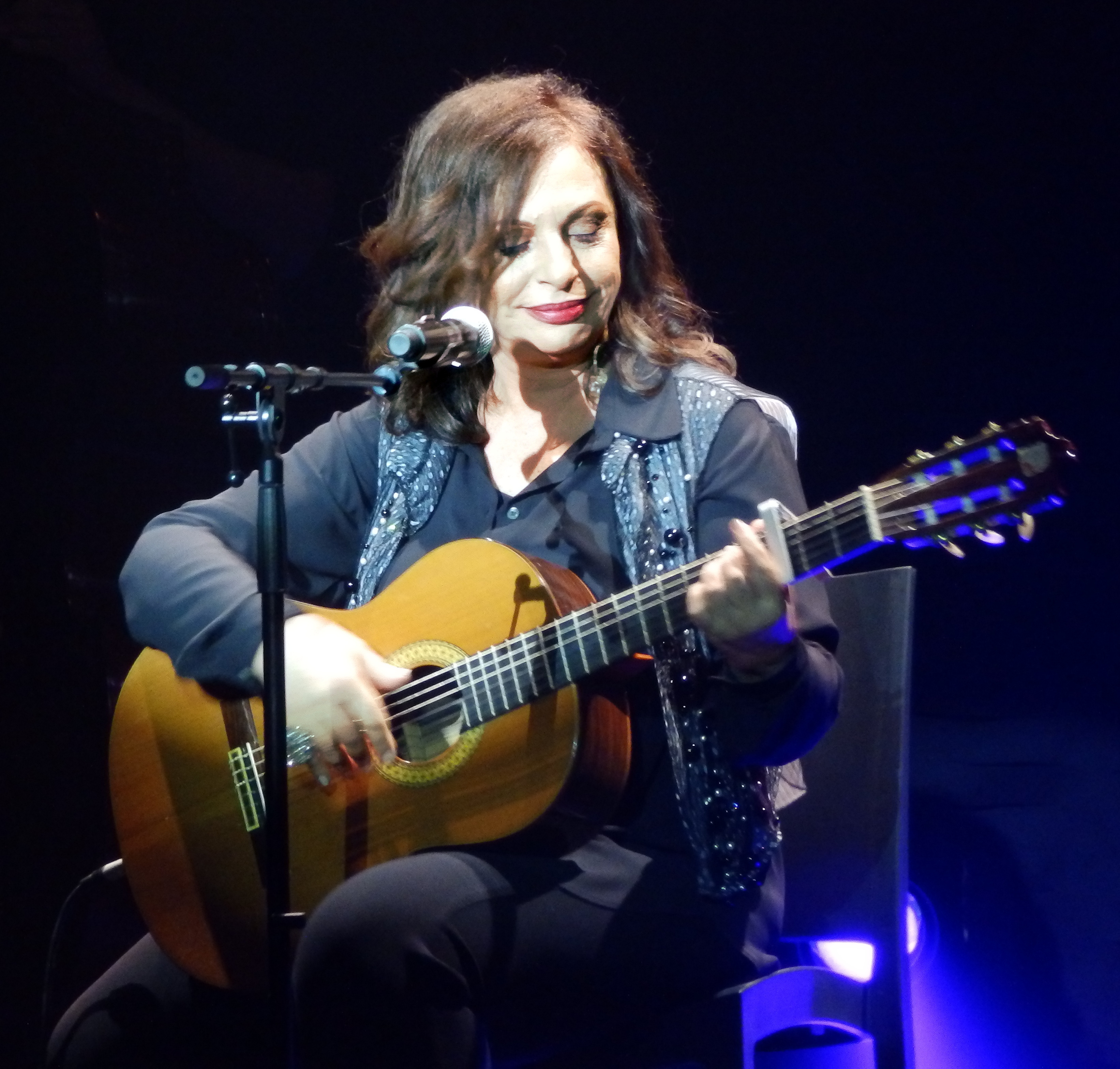
- Haris Alexiou performing in 2014

Background information
- Born: Hariklia Roupaka; 27 December 1950 (age 75); Thebes, Greece
- Genres: Folk, rebetiko, laiko, entehno
- Occupations: Singer, songwriter, composer, actress
- Years active: 1970–
- Labels: Minos (1970–1992); PolyGram Greece (1992–2000); Estia (Sony Music Greece) (2000-2002); Estia (Minos EMI) (2002–2020)

Haris Alexiou (Greek: Χάρις Αλεξίου, pronounced [ˈxaris aleˈksiu]; born 27 December 1950) is a Greek singer whose career has spanned over 5 decades. She is one of the most popular singers in Greece. She has worked with important Greek songwriters and composers, has performed at top musical theatres all over the world, and has received several awards. She has recorded over thirty albums and has been featured on albums of other musicians. On 14th March 2010, Alpha TV ranked Alexiou as the first top-certified female artist in Greece in the phonographic era (since 1960). She is the highest selling Greek female artist and third overall, behind George Dalaras and Yiannis Parios. Eight of her personal albums released between 1977 and 2003 have totaled 11 million sales, the only Greek female artist to do so.

She also has an audience in Turkey and her various songs were sung in Turkish especially "Ola Se Thimizoun" (Everything reminds me of you) as "Olmasa Mektubun" (Without your letter) by Yeni Türkü, Erol Evgin, Müslüm Gürses, Sevda Karababa and Pilli Bebek; Teli Teli Teli as "Telli Telli" (Demoiselle, demoiselle), Pes Mou Pos Ginetai (Tell me, how is it possible?) as "Maskeli Balo" (Masquerade) by Yeni Türkü, Athena and Ata Demirer; Mia Pista Apo Fosforo (A floor of phosphorus) as "Her şeyi yak" by (Burn everything) Sezen Aksu and Duman and as "Nefes Almak İstiyorum" (I want to breathe) by Yonca Evcimik; Krata Gia To Telos (Keep it to the end) as "Sebahat Abla" (Elder sister Sebahat) by Müslüm Gürses; Fevgo (I'm leaving") as "Durma Yağmur" (Rain don't stop) by Gripin.

She has lived in Athens since 1958, when she and her family moved there from Thebes. Her grandmother's family migrated to Thebes in 1924 from Smyrna. Her name was given to a street in Gaziemir, in İzmir province, Turkey.

== Biography ==
Alexiou has stated that she is of Arvanite origin on her father's side and of Anatolian Greek origin on her mother's side. Haris Alexiou appeared in the Greek music scene in the early 1970s. Her charismatic voice, combined with a unique way of performing and a strong stage presence, very soon led her success. She has worked with many Greek songwriters, has performed at the musical theaters on all five continents, and has received awards.

She has recorded over thirty albums and has collaborated with a range of other artists.

=== 1970s ===
The first important step in her career was her participation with George Dalaras in the album Mikra Asia (Asia Minor) written by Apostolos Kaldaras and Pythagoras (Pythagoras Papastamatiou) in 1972. A historic album, the biggest hit of the '70s and included in "Minos-EMI's 100 Greatest Hits of the Century."

In 1973, Alexiou participated in the albums Kalimera ilie (Good Morning, Sun) by Manos Loïzos and Lefteris Papadopoulos, Byzantinos Esperinos (Byzantine Vesper) by Apostolos Kaldaras and Lefteris Papadopoulos and Odos Aristotelous (Aristotelous Street) by Yannis Spanos and Lefteris Papadopoulos. Alexiou and Loïzos later became lifelong friends.

In 1975, her first personal album, 12 'Laika' Songs, was released. One of the songs, "Dimitroula", originally sung in the 1930s by Roza Eskenazi, has become an all-time standard. In the same year, she appeared in "boites" in Plaka, pioneering a new way of presenting songs, completely different from the conventional big nightclubs. It was the first year after the fall of the military junta, a time for political songs and the revival of "rebetika" songs, and Alexiou sang traditional songs, ballads, modern songs, folk songs and rebetika.

For many years, she collaborated with George Dalaras, Dimitra Galani, Vasilis Papakonstantinou and Yiannis Parios. Her concerts in stadiums and theatres, with songs written by Manos Loïzos, Lefteris Papadopoulos, Nikolopoulos, Giannis Spanos, Theodorakis, Stavros Kouyioumtzis and others, were extremely successful. Her popularity reached its peak and since then, she has been "Haroula of Greece".

In 1979, the album Ta tragoudia tis Haroulas (Haroula's Songs) was released. Manos Loïzos had written the music and the lyrics were written by Manolis Rasoulis and Pythagoras (Pythagoras Papastamatiou). From this album, "o Fantaros" ("The Soldier") immediately became a big hit, while "Ola se thymizoun" ("All Things Remind Me of You") is considered one of the most beautiful Greek ballads of all time.

=== 1980s ===
The 1980s started with two enormous hits: "Fevgo" ("I'm Leaving") and "Ximeroni" ("The Day Breaks"). Songs of Yesterday, her album with Dimitra Galani included ballads which fascinated the public. At the same time, she recorded traditional and folk songs, rebetika and laika, and gave concerts both in Greece and abroad.

In 1983 she recorded the album Tsilika, a collector's item, with rebetika songs written between 1900 and 1935.

1986 is the year of her first collaboration with composer Thanos Mikroutsikos. The album was I Agapi ine zali (Dizzy with Love), with lyrics by Alkis Alkeos, Nikos Kavvadias, Andreas Mikroutsikos and Babis Tsikliropoulos. The title song became an enormous hit. "Eleni" and "Erotikon", from the same album, were also extremely successful. The same year Haroula conquered the French public, appearing in "Théâtre de la Ville", getting favorable reviews from the French press. After that, she gave concerts in Cyprus, Tunisia, Germany and many towns all over Greece.

In 1987, Greek composer Manos Hadjidakis invited her to appear in his club "Sirius" with the "Unpredictable Songs". He directed her and later he went to the recording studio with her. In the summer of this year, she sang in Hadjidakis's concerts in many Greek towns.

In 1988, she worked with "Fatme", a group of young and talented artists. She also worked with Paolo Conte, a well-known Italian singer and songwriter. They appeared together at the Palace Theatre of Athens. She recorded two of his songs with Greek lyrics by Lina Nikolakopoulou.

In 1989, "The Show Begins". It is the musical show which she presented for two years, together with Dimitra Galani and Yiannis Parios, in Athens and Thessaloniki. An album with the same title resulted from this work.

=== 1990s ===
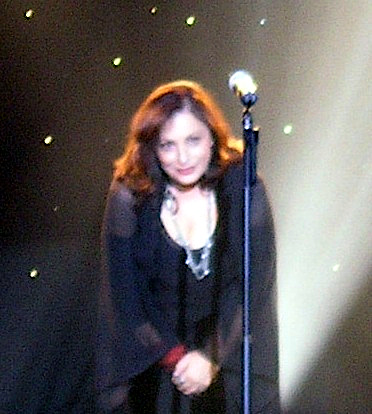
Haris Alexiou

1990 began with her second collaboration with Thanos Mikroutsikos. The album was entitled This Cologne Lingers on for Years, with lyrics by Lina Nikolakopoulou. In October of the same year, she participated in the most important concert of the decade in Peace and Friendship Stadium of Athens. In this festive concert, called "Our Own Night", all the big names of Greek show business were present: Yiannis Parios, Thanos Mikroutsikos, Dimitra Galani, Chris Nikolopoulos, Alkistis Protopsalti, George Sarris, George Zambetas, Lakis Lazopoulos and the legendary Melina Mercouri.

In 1991, she appeared in the Attikon Theatre of Athens with a special show called "In Three Acts". In the first act, she sang songs by Hadjidakis, Loizos, Mikroutsikos and Bertolt Brecht and Kurt Weill. In the second act, she hosted certain groups of modern Greek music and presented songs written by herself. The third act was a medley with her hits, old and new. She then presented this show in the State Theatre of Northern Greece, which for the first time accepted a Greek singer on its stage. With her concerts, sets new standards for musical shows, using state-of-the-art sound and light equipment and impressive decors. In autumn 1991, together with Costas Hadjis, she presented a show directed by Mauro Bolognini at the Rex Theatre in Athens and Radio City in Thessaloniki. Alexiou Sings Hadjis is the album that followed.

In 1992, she started her cooperation with PolyGram, successfully introducing a new style in her songs. The album Di' efchon (L'orale), with music by Nikos Antypas and lyrics by Lina Nikolakopoulou, came as something quite fresh in Greek discography, imparting a new impetus to Haroula's already long career. In 1993, the album was released in Japan, Belgium, France and Israel by PolyGram International. The French TV channel "MCM International" filmed and showed her concert at Lycabetus Theatre. The same year she traveled around the world with concerts in Cyprus, the US, Canada, Israel, several European countries, finishing in Paris at the Mogador Theatre.

In 1994, her album Hey! was released, with music by Nikos Antypas and lyrics by Lefteris Papadopoulos and Aris Davarakis. The summer of the same year, she appeared in the Odeon of Herodes Atticus with a show directed by Mauro Bolognini. In October, she had her first and extremely successful appearance in Japan.

In 1995, the album 88 Nefelis Street was released; she wrote all the songs. For this album, in April 1995 at the Palais des congrès in Paris, she received the Prix Adami, an award given every year by the Académie Charles Cros to distinguished artists. The same year, she opened Studio Nefeli, where she presented her new songs, creating a new "Cafe Theatre" atmosphere. Dimitris Papaioannou was the director of the show.

In 1996, she wrote the lyric for "Nefeli's Tango" on Loreena McKennitt's music. This song, along with other live recordings from her concerts around the world, was included in the album Around the World '92-'96. "Nefeli's Tango" was one of the ten top songs of World Music in Europe for several months.

In summer 1997, at the invitation of Olympic Games Committee "Athens 2004", she gave a concert at Pnyka Hill, very close to the Acropolis. Such was the success of this concert, she had to repeat it twice at the same location.

1998 was the year of The Game of Love, her second album with songs written solely by herself. The recording took place at the Studio Guillaume Tell in Paris with Greek and foreign musicians. The same year, she toured North and South America with Nikos Papazoglou. In December she appeared in Athens at the Diogenis Studio, which was reconstructed in order to meet the demands of the show she presented with Chris Nikolopoulos. The show was directed by Dimitris Papaioannou again.

In October 1999, she sang along with Turkish singer Sezen Aksu, both in Athens and Istanbul, for the victims of the earthquakes which struck the two countries that year, under the auspices of the Ministry of Culture. This cooperation was repeated in summer 2000 in Istanbul and İzmir.

=== 2000–present ===
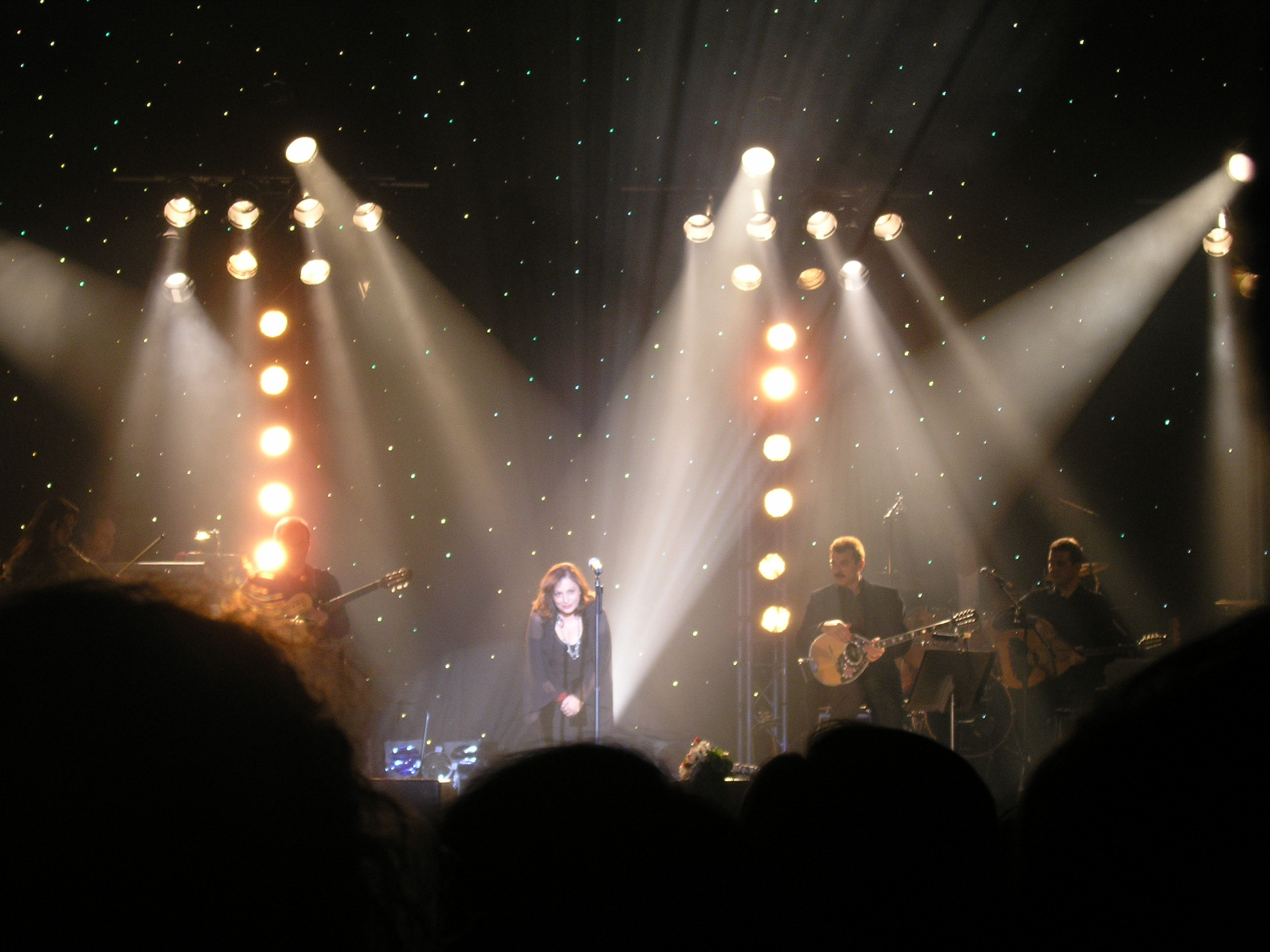
Alexiou in Berlin, October 2006.

In September 2000, the album Whispers was released. It included her favourite songs performed by her and a piano only. In October, she presented these songs in the Athens Concert Hall and in the ancient Epidaurus Odeon, accompanied by a small musical ensemble. The same year, she founded her own record company, Estia, in order to produce all her future discography. In December, the album was released entitled Strange Light. In this album she meets again songwriters with whom she has successfully worked in the past. Strange Light became Lumiere Etrange and was released all over Europe by Universal-France. At the same time, Haroula toured Europe giving concerts at the most prestigious theatres, conquering both audiences and critics. Her tour ended with a triumphal appearance at the Theatre Olympia in Paris.

2002 was another creative year for Haroula. She appeared at the Keramikos Music Hall, this time singing more "laika" songs. In this show, Lavrentis Macheritsas and other younger artists participated. The result was the album Keramikos Live.

In 2003, the album To the end of your heaven went quadruple platinum and World Music Awards, one of the most significant institutions of the international music industry, presented Haris Alexiou with the award for Best-Selling Greek Artist for the season 2003-2004 (2004 World Music Awards).

In 2004, the Olympic Games were held in Athens. Haris Alexiou, sang at the closing ceremony, along with D. Galani, Marinella, Y. Parios, G. Dalaras. In October 2004, the retrospective compilation album Anthology was released. This double CD was composed of 38 songs from her previous albums and of two new ones. Alexiou herself selected the included songs, not only choosing the most popular ones, but also bearing in mind the significance of each song to her.

In April 2005, remastered and repackaged editions of her 16 albums were released under the banner of Minos EMI. The albums were reprinted, digitally remastered, and the new editions were meticulously designed (including the lyrics, many informative texts and original photos from the time of the first release).

In 2006, Haris Alexiou was back with Sour cherry and bitter orange, an album depicting the traditional aspects of contemporary music. Thodoris Papadopoulos, Smaro Papadopoulou and Makis Seviloglou wrote the music and the lyrics, suggesting a return to one's roots. An album that, despite its unusual content, managed to go platinum, just a few months after it was released, receiving people's recognition and love. During the summer she made a series of special appearances. Along with Dimitra Galani, she gave two concerts dedicated to Sofia Vembo at Odeon of Herodes Atticus, an event organized by Athens Festival. She gave four sold-out concerts along with Sokratis Malamas and Alkinoos Ioannidis, celebrating "Melodia" radio station's 25 years of broadcasting, at Lycabettus theatre in Athens and at the "Palais des sports" in Thessaloniki. These concerts were recorded and a double CD and DVD edition was to be released in March 2007. At the end of 2006 Haris Alexiou undertook a major tour around Europe, giving a series of concerts and promoting the international release of her album Anthology.

In early 2007, she appeared at the Athens Concert Hallfor in five concerts directed by Panos Papadopoulos. The songs were orchestrated by Kostas Papadoukas and the orchestra conducted by Alexandros Myrat. Alexiou gave three concerts under the title "Everything reminds me of you", dedicated to Manos Loizos, at the Odeon of Herodes Atticus in June 2007, participating in the celebrations for the 70th anniversary of his birth. The concerts were directed by Panos Papadopoulos Nikos Portokaloglou, the songs were arranged by Kostas Papadoukas, and the lighting was designed by Andreas Sinanos. The group "Triphonon" appeared along with her on stage. Two more concerts were given at Thessaloniki, followed by a summer tour around Greece and Cyprus along with the "Triphonon", dedicated to the great composer. On 22 October the album Haris Alexiou - A tribute to Manos Loizos was released, containing the live recording and videotaping of the concerts given at the Odeon of Herodes Atticus the previous June during the Athens Festival. Nikos Portokaloglou and the group "Triphonon" also appeared on the album. The album was released in both a double CD and a double CD-DVD packaging by Estia recordings.

She has said that Greek songs, through their poets and composers, made her love and better understand the history and the culture of her country.

Since late 2022, Alexiou has appeared as the grandmother Haris in the Greek television series Maestro in Blue on Mega Channel in Greece and Netflix worldwide.

== Discography ==
=== LPs/CDs ===
==== Collaborations ====
- 1972: Mikra Asia (by Apostolos Kaldaras, with George Dalaras)
- 1973: Byzantinos Esperinos (by Apostolos Kaldaras, with George Dalaras)
- 1974: Prodomenos Laos (by Mikis Theodorakis)
- 1974: Kalimera Ilie (by Manos Loizos)
- 1974: Gia Rembetes Kai Gia Filous (by Apostolos Kaldaras, with Dimitris Kondolazos and Kostas Smokovitis)
- 1974: Robinsones (by Apostolos Kaldaras, with Yiannis Parios)
- 1974: Odos Aristotelous (by Giannis Spanos)
- 1981: I synandisi (by Apostolos Kaldaras, with Ilias Klonaridis; Alexiou not credited)

==== Solo ====
- 1975: 12 Laika Tragoudia
- 1976: Haris Alexiou 2
- 1976: Laikes Kyriakes
- 1977: 24 Tragoudia
- 1979: Ta Tragoudia Tis Haroulas (with Manos Loizos)
- 1980: Ksimeronei
- 1981: Ta Tragoudia Tis Htesinis Meras (with Dimitra Galani)
- 1981: Ta Tragoudia Tis Yis Mou
- 1982: I Zoi Mou Kyklous Kanei
- 1983: Ta Tsilika
- 1984: Emfilios Erotas
- 1986: I Agapi Einai Zali (with Thanos Mikroutsikos)
- 1986: A Paris
- 1987: I Haris Alexiou Se Aprovlepta Tragoudia
- 1988: I Nihta Thelei Erota
- 1990: Krataei Hronia Afti I Kolonia
- 1990: I Diki Mas Nihta
- 1991: I Alexiou Tragoudaei Hatzi
- 1992: Di'Efhon
- 1994: Ei
- 1995: Odos Nefelis '88
- 1996: Gyrizontas Ton Kosmo
- 1997: Ena Fili Tou Kosmou
- 1997: Gyrizontas Ton Kosmo Kai Ena Fili Tou Kosmou
- 1998: To Paihnidi Tis Agapis
- 2000: Parakseno Fos
- 2000: Psythyri
- 2002: Cine Kerameikos
- 2003: Os Tin Akri Tou Ouranou Sou
- 2004: Anthologio
- 2006: Vissino Kai Nerantzi
- 2006: Gyrizontas Ton Kosmo Kai Ena Fili Tou Kosmou (Special Edition)
- 2007: Alexiou - Malamas - Ioannidis (Note: Certified Platinum by the IFPI).
- 2007: Afieroma Sto Mano Loizo
- 2009: I Agapi Tha Se Vri Opou Kai Na'sai
- 2012: Live Pallas 2012
- 2012: I Tripla
- 2014: Ta Oneira Ginontai Pali
- 2020: Ta Tragoudia Tis Xenitias

In the below table, the personal albums certified gold or platinum, in descending order by sales. The reeditions' sales are not included.

Album title	Y/Μ	Label			Gold/Plat	Sales
Gyrizontas Ton Kosmo, Live '92-'96	1996/04	Mercury	live recording	LP & CD	P	175.000
Os Tin Akri Tou Ouranou Sou	2003/09	EMI		CD	3P	170.000
Gyrizontas Ton Kosmo Kai Ena Fili Tou Kosmou, Live '92-'97	1997/12	Mercury	live recording	CD	2P	115.000
Di'Efhon	1992/10	Philips		LP & CD	P	110.000
I Agapi Einai Zali	1986/04	Minos		LP & CD	P	100.000
Ta Tragoudia Tis Htesinis Meras	1981/04	Minos		LP & CD	P	100.000
Ta Tragoudia Tis Haroulas	1979/06	Minos		LP & CD	P	100.000
24 Tragoudia	1977/11	Minos		2LPs & CD	P	100.000
Odos Nefelis '88	1995/02	Philips		LP & CD	P	86.000
Anthologio	2004/10	EMI	compilation	2CDs	2P	80.000
Ena Fili Tou Kosmou	1997/04	Mercury	live recording	CD	P	75.000
I Haris Alexiou Se Aprovlepta Tragoudia	1987/04	Minos		LP & CD	G	75.000
I Nihta Thelei Erota	1988/05	Minos		LP & CD	G	68.000
To Paihnidi Tis Agapis	1998/05	Mercury		CD	P	61.000
Vissino Kai Nerantzi	2006/06	EMI		CD	P	50.000
Krataei Hronia Afti I Kolonia	1990/03	Minos		LP & CD	G	50.000
Emfilios Erotas	1984/12	Minos		LP & CD	G	50.000
I Zoi Mou Kyklous Kanei	1982/04	Minos		LP & CD	G	50.000
Ksimeronei	1980/06	Minos		LP & CD	G	50.000
Laikes Kyriakes	1976/12	Minos		LP & CD	G	50.000
Haris Alexiou 2	1976/04	Minos		LP & CD	G	50.000
12 Laika Tragoudia	1975/03	Minos		LP & CD	G	50.000
Afieroma Sto Mano Loizo	2007/10	Estia	live recording	2CDs & DVD	P	40.000
Alexiou-Malamas-Ioannidis Lykabettus Live	2007/03	Estia	live recording	2CDs & DVD	P	30.000
Psythyri	2000/09	Mercury		CD	G	30.000
Ei	1994/05	Philips		LP & CD	G	30.000
Cine Kerameikos	2002/05	Estia	live recording	2CDs	G	25.000
Parakseno Fos	2000/12	Sony		CD	G	25.000
Dos mou mia mera/I diki mou kseni	1998/03	Philips		CD Single	G	11.000

=== Vinyl 45s ===
- 1970: Otan pini mia gineka

A-side: "Otan pini mia gineka", H. Alexiou (H. Vasiliades, Pythagoras)
B-side: "Periexomeno den exeis", Mpampis Tsetinis-Pitsa Papadopoulou (H. Vasiliades, Pythagoras)

- 1971: To parasinthima (Apostolos Kaldaras)

A-side: "To parasinthima", Haris Alexiou (Apostolos Kaldaras)
B-side: "Oi dyo zitianoi", Yannis Parios (Ap. Kaldaras, G. Samoladas)

- 1971: Tous antres tha katarasto

A-side: "Tous antres tha katarasto", Haris Alexiou (G. Hadjinasios, N. Gabriilides)
B-side: "Thaho tis grillies anoiktes", Haris Alexiou (G. Hadjinasios, N. Gabriilides)

- 1971: Irthe i agapi

A-side: "Irthe i agapi (Efige i agapi)", Haris Alexiou-Tolis Voskopoulos (T. Voskopoulos, E. Lymperopoulos)
B-side: "Pali monaxo to paidi", Haris Alexiou (T. Voskopoulos, E. Lymperopoulos)

- 1972: Hasapiko 40

A-side: "Hasapiko 40", Haris Alexiou (M.Hadjidakis, N. Gatsos)
B-side: "Agapi mesa stin kardia", Haris Alexiou (M.Hadjidakis, N. Gatsos)

- 1972: Den yparxei eftyxia

A-side: "Hasapiko 40", Haris Alexiou (M.Hadjidakis, N. Gatsos) [same as above]
B-side: "Den yparxei eftyxia" Litsa Diamanti (G. Katsaros, Pythagoras)

- 1972: Mais

A-side: "Mais", Haris Alexiou (G. Metsikas, M. Fakinos)
B-side: "Tosa kai tosa ximeromata" Haris Alexiou (G. Metsikas, M. Fakinos)

- 1972: O marmaromenos vasilias, from the LP Mikra Asia

A-side: "O marmaromenos vasilias", Haris Alexiou (Ap. Kaldaras, Pythagoras)
B-side: "Mes stou Vosporou ta stena", [George Dalaras] (Ap. Kaldaras, Pythagoras)

- 1973: Maria me ta kitrina from the LP O, ti kosmos mpampa!

A-side: "Maria me ta kitrina", Haris Alexiou (V. Dimitriou)
B-side: "Aspra, kokkina, kitrina, mple", Haris Alexiou (D. Moutsis, G. Logothetis)

- 1973: San louloudi tsakismeno

A-side: "San louloudi tsakismeno", Haris Alexiou (S. Kougioumtzis, K. Athanasiou)
B-side: "Efyge to treno gia tin dysi", Haris Alexiou (S. Kougioumtzis, K. Athanasiou)

- 1973: Paei paei manoula mou

A-side: "Paei paei manoula mou", Haris Alexiou (T. Soukas, Pythagoras)
B-side: "To prosklitirio", Haris Alexiou (T. Soukas, Pythagoras)

- 1973: Kampana tou esperinou, from the LP Vyzantinos Esperinos

A-side: "Kampana tou esperinou", Haris Alexiou (A. Kaldaras, L. Papadopoulos)
B-side: "Kai na ‘mouna to palikari", George Dalaras (T. Soukas, Pythagoras)

- 1974: Ti talaiporia, from the LP Aspro Mavro

A-side: "Ti talaiporia", Haris Alexiou (G. Hadjinasios, S. Tsotou)
B-side: "Ola mas ta plouti", Yannis Parios (G. Hadjinasios, S. Tsotou)

- 1974: Poios to kserei, from the LP Kalimera ilie

A-side: "Poios to kserei", Haris Alexiou (Manos Loizos)
B-side: "Kalimera ilie", Kostas Smokovitis and Aleka Aliberti (Manos Loizos)

- 1975: Na kseres file...

A-side: "Na kseres file", Haris Alexiou (Nasos Nakas)
B-side: "Stis rizes t’ ouranou", Yannis Parios (Nasos Nakas)

- 1975: Dimitroula mou, from the LP 12 Laika tragoudia

A-side: "Dimitroula mou", Haris Alexiou (old folk song)
B-side: "Pos to lene", Haris Alexiou (H. Vasiliades, Pythagoras)

- 1976: Elenitsa, from the LP 12 Laika tragoudia

A-side: "Elenitsa", Haris Alexiou (old folk song)
B-side: "Tsachpin", Haris Alexiou (old folk song)

- 1976: Erinaki, from the LP Haris Alexiou 2

A-side: "Erinaki", Haris Alexiou (old folk song)
B-side: "O doctor", Haris Alexiou (old folk song)

- 1976: I garsona, from the LP Haris Alexiou 2

A-side: "I garsona", Haris Alexiou (old folk song)
B-side: "Ela pare me", Haris Alexiou (G. Sarris, L. Papadopoulos)

- 1977: Esenane tha dialega, from the LP Laikes Kyriakes

A-side: "Esenane tha dialega", Haris Alexiou (S. Kougioumtzis, L. Papadopoulos)
B-side: "Treis i ora nychta", Haris Alexiou (S. Kougioumtzis, M. Eleftheriou)

- 1977: Matia mou matia mou, from the LP Laikes Kyriakes

A-side: "Matia mou matia mou", Haris Alexiou (S. Kougioumtzis, L. Papadopoulos)
B-side: "Ta mavra koroideveis", Haris Alexiou (S. Kougioumtzis, M. Eleftheriou)

- 1981: O fantaros (juke box 45 rpm single)

A-side: "O fantaros", Haris Alexiou (M. Loizos, M. Rasoulis), from the LP Ta tragoudia tis Haroulas
B-side: "Ksimeronei", Haris Alexiou (A. Vardis, H. Alexiou), from the LP Ksimeronei

- 1982: Omorfe mou kosme

A-side: "Omorfe mou kosme", Haris Alexiou (Nasos Nakas-Nanopoulos)
B-side: "Parapono", Giorgos Sarris (Nasos Nakas-Nanopoulos)

- 1985: Kokkino Garifallo, from the Yannis Parios’ LP Ego ki esy

A-side: "Kokkino garyfallo", Yannis Parios and Haris Alexiou (Nikos Ignatiadis)
B-side: "Lovely mandolin [Kokkino garifallo]", Yannis Parios and Haris Alexiou (Nikos Ignatiadis, S. Fassois)

- 1985: Gia ta paidia

A-side: "Gia ta paidia", Haris Alexiou, Bessy Argiraki, Anna Vissi, Tolis Voskopoulos etc. (A. Papadimitriou, Ph. Nikolaou)
B-side: " Gia ta paidia [Instrumental]", Haris Alexiou, Bessy Argiraki, Anna Vissi, Tolis Voskopoulos etc. (A. Papadimitriou, Ph. Nikolaou)

- 1986: Mplexan oi grammes mas, from the Fatmé's LP Vgainoume ap’ to tunnel

A-side: "Mplexan oi grammes mas", Fatmé feat. Haris Alexiou (Nikos Portokaloglou)
B-side: "Pote tha se varetho", Fatmé (Nikos Portokaloglou)

- 1990: Mia pista apo fosforo

A-side: "Dimitroula mou [1990 cover]", Haris Alexiou (old folk song)
B-side: "Mia pista apo fosforo", Haris Alexiou (Th. Mikroutsikos, L. Nikolakopoulou), from the LP Krataei xronia afti i kolonia

- 1992: Magissa, from the LP Di’ Efhon (promo single)

A-side: "Magissa", Haris Alexiou (N. Antypas, L. Nikolakopoulou)
B-side: "Di’ Efhon", Haris Alexiou (N. Antypas, L. Nikolakopoulou)

- 1992: Na ziso i na pethano, from the LP Di’ Efhon (promo single)

A-side: "Na ziso i na pethano [Extended New Version]", Haris Alexiou (N. Antypas, L. Nikolakopoulou)
B-side: " I sinavlia", Haris Alexiou (N. Antypas, L. Nikolakopoulou)

- 1994: Ei, from the LP Ei! (promo single)

A-side: "Ei", Haris Alexiou (N. Antypas, L. Papadopoulos)
B-side: "S’ Ehasa", Haris Alexiou (N. Antypas, L. Papadopoulos)

- 1995: Oi filoi mou, from the LP Odos Nefelis ’88

A-side: "Oi filoi mou", Haris Alexiou (Haris Alexiou)
B-side: "Minoraki", Haris Alexiou (Haris Alexiou)
