= Sokratis Malamas =

Greek singer and songwriter

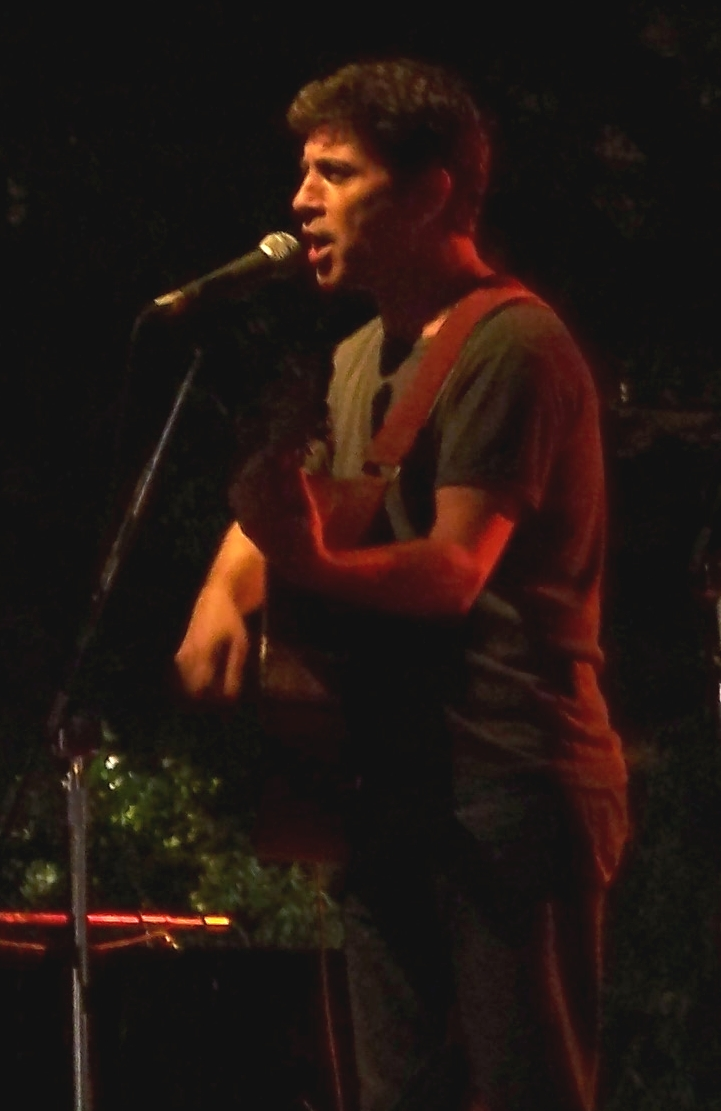
- Sokratis Malamas, 2007

Background information
- Born: 29 September 1957 (age 68); Sykia, Chalkidiki, Kingdom of Greece
- Genres: Rembetiko, Greek Folk music, Greek rock
- Occupation: Singer-songwriter
- Instruments: Vocals, guitar
- Years active: 1989–present

Sokratis Malamas (Greek: Σωκράτης Μάλαμας) (born 29 September 1957) is a Greek singer and songwriter.

== Biography ==
Sokratis Malamas was born on 29 September 1957 in Sykia, Chalkidiki, Greece. His family moved to Stuttgart, Germany for a few years, he later moved to Thessaloniki. There, he sang bouzouki songs and he learned from his father about his music. At age thirteen, he bought his first guitar and practiced for his presentations at school works and when he was seventeen, he followed his guitar studies at the Macedonian Conservatory of Thessaloniki (Μακεδονικό Ωδείο Θεσσαλονίκης = Makedoniko Odeio Thessalonikis). He returned to Germany after he finished school and later went to the Stuttgart Odeon. In one difficult period of his life, he came back to Greece and attended studies at the National Conservatory of Athens (Εθνικό Ωδείο Αθηνών = Ethniko Odeio Athinon). He was taught by Vangelis Assimakopoulos and Notis Mavroudis. At 23, he began his professional career, worked as a guitar teacher and a singer in some public shops. Before he continued into his personal way, he was a guitarist at the orchestra of Nikos Papazoglou.

He continued to play music in public shops, he tried and put his songs on programs. Not until the time that Nikos Papazoglou made him enter the studio and began his first album Aspromavres Istories in 1989. Sokratis Malamas wrote songs for theatrical releases and made his performance in the odeon. His direction of his works was better known and loved his charts.

He performed with famous musicians including Manolis Rasoulis, composers including Nikos Xydakis, singer Melina Kana, singer Lizeta Kalimeri,singer-songwriter Thanasis Papakonstantinou and cooperated with other lyricists and musicians including Giannis Tsatsopoulos, Giorgos Athanassopoulos, Alkis Alkaiou, Fotini Lambridis, Thodoros Gonis, Michalis Gkanas and Odysseas Ioannou. He also participated in works of other musicians including Dionyssis Tsaknis, Maria Thoidou, B.D. Foxmoor and Sadahzinia (of Active Member), Eleftheria Arvanitaki, Thanos Mikroutsikos, Michalis Siganidis, Takis Vouis, Maria Papanikolaou Alkinoos Ioannidis, Haris Alexiou and others.

Malamas also wrote songs and featured them in movies including To Kynigi To Lagou (Το Κυνήγι του Λαγού) and interpreted a song called To Chrono na Lavoso (Το χρόνο να λαβώσω) in a short-length film Ypsoma 33 (Ύψωμα 33) ,

== Discography ==
- Aspromavres Istories – Ασπρόμαυρες Ιστορίες [Stories in Black and White] (1989)
- Paramithia – Παραμύθια [Fables] (1991)
- Tis Meras kai tis Nixtas – Της Μέρας και της Νύχτας [Of Day and Night] (1992)
- Kyklos – Κύκλος [Circle] (1993)
- Lavyrinthos – Λαβύρινθος [Labyrinth] (1996)
- 13.000 Meres – 13.000 Μέρες [13.000 Days] (1998)
- O Fylakas kai o Vasilias – Ο Φύλακας και ο Βασιλιάς [The Guardian and the King] (2000)
- Ena – Ένα [One] (2002)
- Adeio Domatio – Άδειο [Empty Room] (2005)
- Dromi – Δρόμοι [Pathways] (2007)
- Ekso – Έξω [Outside] (2010)
- Perasma – Πέρασμα [Passage] (2010)
- Hartis – Χάρτης [Map] (2014)
- Me stoma pou gela – Με στόμα που γελά (2018)

== Productions ==
- 1994 – To Fantasma Apo to Parelthon (Το φάντασμα από το παρελθόν) (Akti)
- 1995 – Stin Andromeda Kai Sti Gi (Στην Ανδρομέδα και στη Γη = On Andromeda And On Earth) (Lyra)
- 1997 – I Gynaika Kai To Milo (Η γυναίκα και το μήλο) (Mylos)
- 1997 – Pyli Tis Ammou (Πύλη της άμμου = Sand Gate) (Mylos)
- 1997 – San Petalouda (Σαν πεταλούδα = Like A Butterfly) Virgin
- 1999 – Me tin Plati ston Ticho (Με την πλάτη στον τοίχο = With The Back on the Wall)
- 1999 – Mikres Angelies (Μικρές αγγελίες = Little Tidings)
- 2006 – Plano Eksodou (Πλάνο Εξόδου = Exit Plan)
