= Vasilis Papakonstantinou (album) =

Studio album by Vasilis Papakonstantinou
- Released: 1978
- Studio: Action Studio, Athens
- Label: MINOS

Vasilis Papakonstantinou chronology
| Vasilis Papakonstantinou (1978) | Armenia (1979) |

Vasilis Papakonstantinou is the debut album from Vasilis Papakonstantinou. It was recorded after his return from touring abroad as a singer for Mikis Theodorakis's tour. Most of the songs for the album are originals written by singer-songwriter Antonis Vardis (who also contributed most of the guitar work in the album) with lyrics by Panos Falaras. The album also includes the first attempt as a songwriter by the popular singer Haris Alexiou. The remaining songs are covers: two by Catalan singer-songwriter Lluis Llach with Greek lyrics by Falaras, a song by singer-songwriter Dionysis Savvopoulos (originally from his 1966 debut album To Fortigo) A Thanos Mikroutsikos song (originally from his 1975 Politika tragoudia debut album), and a Mikis Theodorakis song (from his Arcadia II song cycle written in 1969 during his house arrest and first recorded for his 1974 New songs album).

The arrangements for the songs were by Kostas Ganoselis, who also plays keyboards on this album. Ganoselis worked with Papakonstantinou on three more albums in the first half of the 1980s.

== Personnel ==
- Antonis Vardis – classical, acoustic, 12-string, and electric guitars
- Kostas Ganoselis – piano, synthesizer, glockenspiel
- Michalis Tripolitsiotis – bass guitar
- Tassos Diakogiorgis – drums
- Giorgos Tsoupakis – percussion
- Dimitris Vraskos – violin
- Nikos Avgeris – violin
- Dimitris Doufexiadis – cello
- Gerasimos Ioannidis – trumpet
- Giannis Elefantis – trombone

== Track listing ==
| No. | Title | Lyrics | Music | Length |
|---|---|---|---|---|
| 1. | "Me to Bob Dylan [With Bob Dylan]" | Panos Falaras | Antonis Vardis | 3:29 |
| 2. | "Tora tora [cover with Greek lyrics of Llach's "L'estaca"]" | Falaras | Lluis Llach | 3:53 |
| 3. | "Sakatemena tragoudia [Crippled songs]" | Falaras | Vardis | 2:12 |
| 4. | "Eparchia 1978 [Province 1978]" | Falaras | Vardis | 3:55 |
| 5. | "Varethika ta chorata [I am tired of jokes]" | Haris Alexiou | Haris Alexiou | 2:38 |
| 6. | "Sto pazari toy listi [At the bandit's bazaar]" | Manos Eleftheriou | Mikis Theodorakis | 3:14 |
| 7. | "Ola tachei o baxes [cover with Greek lyrics of Llach's "Damunt d'una terra"]" | Falaras | Llach | 3:00 |
| 8. | "Sto Dionysi S. [To Dionysis S.]" | Falaras | Vardis | 3:31 |
| 9. | "Tharthoun stigmes [There will be moments]" | Falaras | Vardis | 2:39 |
| 10. | "Ta poulia tis dystychias [The birds of sorrow]" | Dionysis Savvopoulos | Dionysis Savvopoulos | 3:33 |
| 11. | "Pali vrechi [It is raining again]" | Falaras | Vardis | 3:13 |
| 12. | "Fevgoun karavia [Ships are leaving]" | Falaras | Vardis | 2:41 |
| 13. | "Autous tous echo varethi [I have grown sick of them]" | Wolf Bierman (translated by Dimosthenis Kourtovik) | Thanos Mikroutsikos | 3:33 |
