= Giannis Kalatzis =

Greek singer (1938–2017)

Giannis Kalatzis (Greek: Γιάννης Καλατζής, 29 April 1938 – 13 July 2017) was a Greek singer who was especially popular in Greece in the late 1960s and the first half of the 1970s.

== Biography ==
Giannis Kalatzis was born in Thessaloniki in 1938. His career as a singer began in the early 1960s when he was a member of the Trio Moreno in Thessaloniki. Kalatzis later moved to Athens, where he initially co-operated with the famous composer Giorgos Mitsakis. His popularity began to increase and he had a productive collaboration with some of the most famous Greek composers of the period – Manos Loizos, Stavros Kougioumtzis, Giorgos Katsaros, Mimis Plessas, Giannis Spanos, and Tolis Voskopoulos. Kalatzis participated in albums alongside singers such as Giorgos Dalaras, Haris Alexiou, Giannis Parios, Mariza Koch, Litsa Diamanti and Kostas Smokovitis. He also appeared in ten films.

In the second half of the 1970s, Kalatzis co-operated with composer Nikos Karvelas and in 1981 he released an album with the songs of Tolis Voskopoulos. His last album before giving up active singing was in 1984, however, in 1985, he took part in a big concert dedicated to composer Manos Loizos held in Athens Olympic Stadium. In 2000, he released a double CD, the first disc with his greatest hits in new versions and the second disc with famous Greek sons in his rendition. Kalatzis is considered one of the best singers of the time and his songs have been performed by younger singers as well.

In 2013, Giannis Kalatzis was honoured in the Greek version of the television programme Your Face Sounds Familiar broadcast by ANT1 with actor Konstantinos Kazakos impersonating him and performing one of his most famous songs – 'Delfini delfinaki'.

He died in 2017 in Athens.

== Discography ==
=== Personal albums ===
- 1968: Giannis Kalatzis
- 1969: O Epipoleos
- 1970: Kyra Giorgena
- 1971: Paramythaki Mou
- 1973: Ena Taxidi
- 1975: Ke I Zoi Sinechizete
- 1976: Mi Perimenis
- 1978: Kapios Panta Leei Antio
- 1979: Ta Kalitera Mou Tragoudia
- 1979: Pali Konta Sou
- 1981: Gia Olous
- 1984: Thymithite Me Ton Gianni Kalatzi
- 1989: I Megaliteres Epitihies Tou (Compilation)
- 1994: I Megales Epitihies (Compilation)
- 1996: Tragoudia Apo tis 45' Strofes

=== Collaborations ===
- 1968: Stathmos
- 1969: An Zousan I Archei
- 1969: Synantisi
- 1970: Thalassografies
- 1971: Zei?
- 1971: O Stamoulis O Lochias
- 1971: Otan Anthizoun I Paschalies
- 1972: I Ora Tis Gardenias
- 1972: Na 'Chame, Ti Na 'Chame
- 1974: 13 Periptosis
- 1974: Manolis Barberakis No. 2
- 1974: Odos Aristotelous
- 1974: Oh, Ti Kosmos? Mpampa
- 1974: 13 Periptosis
- 1974: Welcome To Greece No. 5
- 1977: Agapo Mia Pantremeni
- 1985: Manos Loizos – Afieroma, Live

== TV appearances ==
- Το Παρτυ της Ζωης Σου (2005) ALTER
- Δρόμοι (2005) ΕΤ1
- Κοίτα τι Έκανες (2004) ΝΕΤ
- Οδικές βοήθειες MEGA
- Μαζί την Κυριακή (1996) ANT1
- Ciao (1992) ANT1
- Στιγμές από το ελληνικό τραγούδι (1990) ET2
- Εν αρχή ην ο λόγος – Αφιέρωμα στον Πυθαγόρα (1988) ΕΤ2
- Εν αρχή ην ο λόγος – Κώστας Βίρβος (1988) ΕΤ2
- Γιώργος Κατσαρός – Παραλλαγές στο Ιδιο Θέμα (1986) ΕΡΤ
- Λαϊκό πάλκο (1985) ΕΡΤ
- Αφιέρωμα στον Μάνο Λοϊζο (1985) ΕΡΤ
- Αφιερώματα – Θόδωρος Δερβενιώτης (1983) ΕΡΤ
- Σταύρος Κουγιουμτζής – 20 χρόνια Τραγούδι (1982) ΕΡΤ
- Έξι ρεβεγιόν, εξήντα χρόνια (1978) ΕΡΤ
- Στούντιο 3 (1978) ΕΡΤ
- Ντο-Ρε-Μι (1974) ΕΙΡΤ
- Δώδεκα μήνες τραγούδι (1973) ΕΙΡΤ
- Σήμερα ΥΕΝΕΔ
- Αλάτι και πιπέρι (1971) ΥΕΝΕΔ
