= Atreides =

Atreides may refer to:

- Descendants of Greek mythical figure Atreus, especially:
  - Agamemnon
  - Menelaus
- House Atreides, a fictional noble family in Frank Herbert's Dune universe
  - Alia Atreides
  - Ghanima Atreides
  - Leto II Atreides
  - Paul Atreides
- Atreides (album), a 1980 album by Yannis Zouganelis
