= Manos Loïzos =

Greek music composer (1937–1982)

- Born: 22 October 1937; Alexandria, Kingdom of Egypt
- Died: 17 September 1982 (aged 44) Moscow, Russian SFSR, USSR
- Occupation: Composer

Manos Loïzos (Greek: Μάνος Λοΐζος; 1937–1982) was one of the most important Greek Cypriot music composers of the 20th century.

== Biography ==
He was born on 22 October 1937 to Greek Cypriot immigrants in Alexandria, Egypt. His parents came from the small village of Agioi Vavatsinias, in the district of Larnaca, Cyprus. Loizos moved to Athens at the age of 17 intending to study pharmacology but soon gave up his studies in order to concentrate on his musical career. He was a self-taught musician, with no formal musical arts training. His first recordings were made in 1963 but he started gaining a larger audience after 1967. By 1975 Loizos had become one of the most popular artists in Greek music.

He died on 17 September 1982 in a hospital in Moscow, Soviet Union after suffering several strokes. He was well known for his leftist political ideology and was an outspoken critic of the Greek military junta. He was also an active member of the Communist Party of Greece. The year 2007 was declared "Manos Loizos Year" in Greece.

== Discography ==
He composed many well-known Greek songs and has co-operated with various important composers, singers and lyricists like Mikis Theodorakis, Haris Alexiou, George Dalaras, Vasilis Papakonstantinou, Christos Leontis, Fondas Ladis, Yannis Negrepontis, Manolis Rasoulis, Giannis Kalatzis, Nâzım Hikmet and many others. His best known co-operation was with his very personal friend, lyricist Lefteris Papadopoulos who wrote the lyrics of many of Loizos' most successful hits.

Some of Loizos' most famous songs are :

- "Ola se thymizoun (Everything Reminds Me of You)" Lyrics: Manolis Rassoulis
- "Jamaica" Lyrics: Lefteris Papadopoulos
- "S' Akoloutho (I follow you)" Lyrics: himself
- "To Akordeon (The Accordion)" Lyrics: Yannis Negrepontis
- "O Dromos (The Street)" Lyrics: Kostoula Mitropoulos
- "Che" (dedicated to Che Guevara) Lyrics: himself
- "Ah Helidoni mu (Ah, my swallow)" Lyrics: Lefteris Papadopoulos
- "De Tha Ksanagapiso (I Shall not Love Again)" Lyrics: Lefteris Papadopoulos
- "Paporaki tou Burnova (Paporaki of Burnova)" Lyrics: Lefteris Papadopoulos
- "O Koutalianos" Lyrics: Lefteris Papadopoulos
- "Evdokia" (Instrumental Zeibekiko)
- "Kalimera Ilie (Goodmorning Sun)" Lyrics: Manos Loizos. During the 1981-1989 period the song was used as trademark by the political movement PASOK

In 1985, a big concert dedicated to his memory took place in the Athens Olympic Stadium, attended by more than 50,000 people with singers George Dalaras, Haris Alexiou, Giannis Kalatzis, Dimitra Galani and Vasilis Papakonstantinou performing. Manos Loizos' songs and music remain popular until today among all ages of the Greek society.

=== Studio albums ===
Year	Title	Chart positions		Certification
Year	Title	GRE	CYP	Certification
1968	O Stathmos (Greek: Ο Σταθμός; English: The Station): Début studio album; First album ever in Greek market bearing the ‘MINOS’ logo; Lyrics by Lefteris Papadopoulos; Singers of the album were Giannis Kalatzis, George Dalaras, Litsa Diamanti and Dimitris Efstathiou; Released: December 1968; Language: Greek; Label: Minos EMI; Formats: LP, cassette, CD	—	—	IFPI Greece: –
1970	Thalassografies (Greek: Θαλασσογραφίες; English: Sea Drawings): 2nd studio album; Lyrics by Lefteris Papadopoulos; Singers of the album were Manos Loizos, George Dalaras, Giannis Kalatzis, Yiannis Parios and Mariza Koch; Released: October 1970; Language: Greek; Label: Minos EMI; Formats: LP, cassette, CD	—	—	IFPI Greece: –
1971	Evdokia (Greek: Ευδοκία): 1st soundtrack album; Movie Evdokia was directed by Alexis Damianos; Released: December 1971; Language: Greek; Label: Minos EMI; Formats: LP, cassette, CD	—	—	IFPI Greece: –
1972	Na Chame Ti Na Chame (Greek: Να ‘Χαμε Τι Να ‘Χαμε; English: If We Had): 3rd studio album; Lyrics by Lefteris Papadopoulos; Lyrics of the album were censored due to dictatorship.; Singers of the album were George Dalaras, Giannis Kalatzis, Manos Loizos and Haris Alexiou (backing vocals); Released: December 1972; Language: Greek; Label: Minos EMI; Formats: LP, cassette, CD	—	—	IFPI Greece: –
1974	Kalimera Ilie (Greek: Καλημέρα Ήλιε; English: Goodmorning Sun): 4th studio album; Lyrics by Dimitris Christodoulou; Lyrics of the album were censored due to dictatorship.; Singers of the album were Kostas Smokovitis, Haris Alexiou and Aleka Aliberti.; Recording sessions were made in November 1973 during riots against the Greek military junta.; Self-titled song has been used as the anthem of the Panhellenic Socialist Movement since 1974. In 2011, Myrsini Loïzou, Manos’ daughter, forbade the use of the song as political anthem due to severe disapproval of the government's policy.; Released: April 1974; Language: Greek; Label: Minos EMI; Formats: LP, cassette, CD	-	-	IFPI Greece: –
1974	Tragoudia Tou Dromou (Greek: Τραγούδια Του Δρόμου; English: Songs of the Road): 5th studio album; Lyrics by Manos Loizos, Lefteris Papadopoulos, Dimitris Christodoulou, Federico Garcia Lorca and Kostoula Mitropoulou.; Singers of the album were Manos Loïzos, Vasilis Papakonstantinou and Aleka Aliberti.; Released: November 1974; Language: Greek; Label: Minos EMI; Formats: LP, cassette, CD	-	-	IFPI Greece: –
1975	Ta Negrika (Greek: Τα Νέγρικα; English: The Negro Songs): 6th studio album; Lyrics by Yiannis Negrepontis; All songs of the album sung by Maria Farantouri.; Released: November 1975; Language: Greek; Label: Minos EMI; Formats: LP, CD, cassette	-	-	IFPI Greece: –
1976	Ta Tragoudia Mas (Greek: Τα Τραγούδια Μας; English: Our Songs): 7th studio album; Lyrics by Fontas Ladis; All songs of the album sung by George Dalaras.; 9 out of 11 songs were censored by the Greek National Television and Radio; Released: October 1976; Language: Greek; Label: Minos EMI; Formats: LP, CD, cassette	1	1	IFPI Greece: Platinum
1979	Ta Tragoudia Tis Haroulas (Greek: Τα Τραγούδια Της Χαρούλας; English: Haroula’s Songs): 8th studio album; Lyrics by Manolis Rasoulis and Pythagoras.; All songs of the album sung by Haris Alexiou. Includes one of her biggest hits ‘Ola Se Thimizoun’. Manos Loïzos and Dimitra Galani assisted with backing vocals in most of the album's songs.; Due to heavy criticism by the media, the album had failed to chart for four months after its release. Further promotion by Alexiou helped album sales rise to platinum status.; Released: May 1979; Language: Greek; Label: Minos EMI; Formats: LP, CD, cassette	1	1	IFPI Greece: Platinum
1980	Gia Mia Mera Zoïs (Greek: Για Μια Μέρα Ζωής; English: For One Day’s Life): 9th studio album; Last album recorded while alive.; Lyrics by Manos Loizos, Lefteris Papadopoulos, Manolis Rasoulis, Tasos Livaditis, Fontas Ladis and Dora Sitzani.; Singers of the album were Manos Loizos, Vasilis Papakonstantinou and Dimitra Galani.; Released: December 1980; Language: Greek; Label: Minos EMI; Formats: LP, CD, cassette	-	—	IFPI Greece: Gold
1983	Grammata stin agapimeni (Greek: Γράμματα στην αγαπημένη; English: Letters To The Beloved One): Posthumous release.; Lyrics by Nâzım Hikmet.; Manos Loizos sung himself all the album's songs.; The album is a compilation of previously unreleased recordings made by Loïzos sporadically throughout his career.; Released: October 1983; Language: Greek; Label: Minos EMI; Formats: LP, CD, cassette	—	—	IFPI Greece: –
