= Nikolas Asimos =

Greek composer and singer

Nikolaos Asimopoulos Νικόλας Άσιμος
- Also known as: Nikos
- Born: Nikolas Asimopoulos; 20 August 1949; Thessaloniki, Greece
- Died: 17 March 1988 (aged 38) Exarcheia, Athens, Greece
- Genres: Rock
- Occupations: Singer, guitarist, songwriter, performance artist, political activist

Nikolas Asimos (Greek: Νικόλας Άσιμος; 20 August 1949 – 17 March 1988) was a Greek composer, singer and performance artist. His real surname was Asimopoulos (Ασημόπουλος). Asimos was a very special case of a counter-culture artist, mostly because of his lifestyle. His behavior and songs were often received as provocative by the general public. He was a person with strong political opinions. Ideologically, he could be categorized as an anarchist but he never accepted being put in a specific political ideology.

== Early life ==
Nikolas Asimos was born in Thessaloniki and grew up, in Kozani, where his parents were from. In 1967, he enrolled in the Philosophical School of the Aristotle University of Thessaloniki. During his college years, he was often involved with theater and the performing arts whilst writing songs and singing in various boîtes of Thessaloniki.

He often had problems with the police, particularly during the period of military rule — junta — in Greece and the consequent restriction on civil liberties, i.e., freedom of expression.

== Career ==
In 1973, he moved to Athens from Thessaloniki; there he continued to be involved in theatre studies and graduated from a private theatre school. He wrote songs that were not recorded officially, but rather privately and on tapes that he would then sell on the streets of Athens. He performed in boîtes around Plaka along with Yannis Zouganelis and Sakis Boulas, among others. His first official recording effort was in 1974 with the single Romios – Michanismos (Ρωμιός – Μηχανισμός). In 1976, he had a daughter with Lillian Charitaki with whom he was not married.

In 1977, he was temporarily imprisoned along with five other editors and writers. They were all released after an initiative by Dionysis Savvopoulos. In 1978, he was drafted into the Greek army but did not serve as he was relieved of duty for psychological reasons. He wrote a book titled Anazitontas Krokantropous (Αναζητώντας Κροκανθρώπους "Looking for Yolkthat) which was never officially published but was circulated by him in photocopies. In his later years and after his death, the book was also made available by a publishing house. In 1982, he released his long-play record titled O Ksanapes (Ο Ξαναπές), "The Say-It-Again Man".

In 1987, he was accused of raping an ex-girlfriend and was forcibly placed in a mental institution. Shortly after he was sent to Korydallos Prison for pre-trial detention, during which his ex-girlfriend withdrew her accusations and tried to drop the charges against him. The prosecutor, however, denied dropping the charges and Asimos stayed in Korydallos until he was bailed out at the end of June. After being released, he never managed to overcome his bitterness over this charge. The outstanding trial along with other personal problems affected his psychological state profoundly. After two failed attempts, he committed suicide by hanging on 17 March 1988 in his house which he used to call the "preparation area". It is rumored that he kept a diary during the last 15 days of his life in which he describes his efforts to find something worth living for in his life. He marked the pages with an "X" which meant that he had not found anything worth living for. The 15th day was also marked with an "X" which is the day he hanged himself.

== Production ==
His Paranomes Kassetes (illegal tapes), as Asimos liked to call his early work due to its lyrical content, were recorded in friends' houses and other more or less inappropriate (concerning a recording session) locations, with several musicians accompanying him. The tapes had an underground distribution by Asimos himself or his friends because he wanted to avoid his work being exploited by Record Labels. Apart from the tapes, he produced during his lifetime a 45 rpm single with two songs and a full-length LP, as well as five compositions for a Vasilis Papakonstantinou record. The rest of his work was released after he died.

== Discography ==
- 1974 – Romios – Michanismos (Ρωμιός – Μηχανισμός), single
- 1978 – Kasseta me to Vareli pou gia na Vgei to Spaei – Paranomi Kasseta No.000001 (Kασσέτα με το Βαρέλι για να Βγει το Σπάει – Παράνομη Κασσέτα No.000001)
- 1979 – Eimai Palianthropos – Paranomi Kasseta No.000002 (Είμαι Παλιάνθρωπος – Παράνομη Κασσέτα No.000002)

part A of trilogy Tripli Kasseta Mpela me Horis Tampela (Τριπλή Κασσέτα Μπελα με Χωρίς Ταμπέλα)

- 1979 – Giati Foras Klouvi – Paranomi Kasseta No.000003 (Γιατί Φοράς Κλουβί – Παράνομη Κασσέτα No.000003)

part Β of trilogy Tripli Kasseta Mpela me Horis Tampela (Τριπλή Κασσέτα Μπελα με Χωρίς Ταμπέλα)

- 1979 – Klaste Eleftheros – Paranomi Kasseta No.000004 (Κλάστε Ελεύθερος – Παράνομη Κασσέτα No.000004)

part C of trilogy Tripli Kasseta Mpela me Horis Tampela (Τριπλή Κασσέτα Μπελα με Χωρίς Ταμπέλα)

- 1982 – O Ksanapes (Ο Ξαναπές). (Vasilis Papakonstantinou and Haris Aleksiou participated).
- 1986 – O Saliagkas – Paranomi Kasseta No.000005 (Ο Σάλιαγκας – Παράνομη Κασσέτα No.000005)
- 1986 – H Zavolia – Paranomi Kasseta No.000006 (Η Ζαβολιά – Παράνομη Κασσέτα No.000006)
- 1986 – Pali stin Kseftila – Paranomi Kasseta No.000007 (Πάλι στην Ξεφτίλα – Παράνομη Κασσέτα No.000007)
- 1987 – To Fanari tou Diogeni – Paranomi Kasseta No.000008 (Το Φανάρι του Διογένη – Παράνομη Κασσέτα No.000008)

This record was re-released in 1989 after Asimos' death, where some songs were excluded due to intervention by the record company. Sotiria Leonardou participated in the record.

- 1987 – Asimos contributed 5 songs in Heretismata (Χαιρετίσματα) by Vasilis Papakonstantinou.
- 1992 – Sto Falimento tou Kosmou (Στο Φαλημέντο του Κόσμου) Includes a selection from his Paranomes Kassetes. Vasilis Papakonstantinou participated.
- 2002 – Viomichania tou Pezodromiou (Βιομηχανία του Πεζοδρομίου) Double CD compilation with songs from Asimos' Paranomes Kassetes.

== Covers ==
- 1997 – The Greek rock band Magic de Spell released a cover version of Mpataria (Μπαταρία) in their CD single O Fovos Ehi Onoma (Ο Φόβος Έχει Όνομα).
- 1997 – Vasilis Papakonstantinou used five Asimos songs in his album Pes mou Ena Psema n' Apokoimitho (Πες μου Ένα Ψέμα ν' Αποκοιμηθώ).
- 2000 – The Greek rock band Endelecheia released a cover version of Mpagasas (Μπαγάσας) in their CD single Kathreftis (Καθρέφτης).

== Books ==
- Anazitontas Krokanthropous (Αναζητώντας Κροκανθρώπους), 2000, Vivliopelagos Publications, ISBN 960-7280-14-8, 380pp.
