= Atreides (album) =

Studio album by Yannis Zouganelis
- Released: 1980
- Studio: Studio Action, Athens
- Label: MINOS
- Producer: A. Theofilou

Yannis Zouganelis chronology
Instories tou pappou Aristofani	Atreides	Opou ki an texidepso e Ellada me pligoni

Vasilis Papakonstantinou chronology
Armenia	Atreides	Fovame

Atreides is Yannis Zouganelis' third studio album. The album contains songs written for the play of the same name which was a "montage of Greek tragedies based on the myth of the House of Atreus". The play included pieces from Oresteia by Aeschylus, Electra by Sophocles, and Iphigenia at Aulis, Iphigenia in Tauris, and Orestes by Euripides translated and adapted from the Ancient Greek by Kostas Myris, who also wrote the lyrics of the songs which were sung by Vasilis Papakonstantinou. The play was performed by "Theatro Erevnas" of Dimitris Potamitis at the Mount Lycabettus theatre in Athens and later broadcast by the Greek national television ERT on 12 November 1979.

== Track listing ==
No.	Title	Lyrics	Music	Length
1.	"Eisodos [Entry]"	Kostas Myris	Yannis Zouganelis
2.	"Iphigenia"	Myris	Zouganelis
3.	"Thysia Iphigenias [Iphigenia's sacrifice]"	Myris	Zouganelis
4.	"Eleni [Helen]"	Myris	Zouganelis
5.	"Kassandra"	Myris	Zouganelis
6.	"Yparchi theos [There is god]"	Myris	Zouganelis
7.	"Electra"	Myris	Zouganelis
8.	"Erinya"	Myris	Zouganelis
9.	"Efialtis tou Oresti [Oreste's nightmare]"	Myris	Zouganelis
10.	"I gis trefi [The earth nurishes]"	Myris	Zouganelis
11.	"Cletemnestra"	Myris	Zouganelis
12.	"Orestes"	Myris	Zouganelis
13.	"Ypodochi tou Agamemnona [Agamemnon's welcoming]"	Myris	Zouganelis
14.	"Dikeosyni [Justice]"	Myris	Zouganelis
15.	"Oi theoi tou Olympou [The Olympian gods]"	Myris	Zouganelis
16.	"Exodos [Exit]"	Myris	Zouganelis
