= Nikos Xydakis (musician) =

Nikos Xydakis Νίκος Ξυδάκης
- Born: 17 March 1952 (age 73); Cairo, Kingdom of Egypt
- Origin: Greece
- Occupations: Composer, pianist, singer
- Instrument: Piano
- Years active: 1978–present

Nikos Xydakis (Greek: Νίκος Ξυδάκης; born 17 March 1952) is a Greek composer, pianist, and singer. Born in Cairo, Egypt, he immigrated with his family to Greece in 1963. Much of his music has its root in theatrical music.

Xydakis has collaborated with many of the most influential Greek musicians, actors and directors, including Eleftheria Arvanitaki and Sokratis Malamas. His work includes the music for Theater of Thessaly's historic production of Electra. His professional partner is Theodore Gonis.

== Discography ==
- 1978: The Revenge of Gypsy-ness (Εκδίκηση της γυφτιάς) – with Nikos Papazoglou, Dimitris Kontoyiannis and Sofia Diamanti, lyrics by Manolis Rasoulis)
- 1979: So-called (Τα δήθεν) – with Nikos Papazoglou, Dimitris Kontoyiannis and Sofia Diamanti (lyrics Manolis Rassoulis)
- 1983: First night in Athens (Πρώτο βράδυ στην Αθήνα) – lyrics Michalis Ghanas, Manolis Rassoulis und Nikos Xydakis)
- 1985: Mania (Μανία), soundtrack for film by Giorgos Panousopoulos
- 1987: Near Fame for a Moment (Κοντά στη δόξα μια στιγμή) – lyrics Manolis Rassoulis, Tassos Samartzis, Emmanouil Zahos and Thodoris Ghonis
- 1989: Cairo – Nafplio – Khartoum (Κάιρο-Ναύπλιο-Χαρτούμ) – lyrics Thodoris Ghonis
- 1990: To Mr. Georgio de Rossi (Προς Τον Κύριον Γεώργιο Δε Ρωσση) – lyrics Dionissios Solomos
- 1991: Tenedos (Τενεδος) – with Dora Masclavanou and Eleftheria Arvanitaki with Nikos Xydakis. lyrics, Thodoris Ghonis)
- 1994: Honey of the Cliffs (Μέλι των Γκρεμών) – with Eleftheria Arvanitaki, Melina Kana and Dora Masclavanou.
- 1996: Calendar (Ι ημερολόγιο)
- 1997: Cape Tenaron (Ακρωτήριο Ταίναρον) with Elefteria Arvanitaki and Dora Masclavanou, lyrics Thodoris Ghonis)
- 1999: The Sin of my Mother (Το αμάρτημα της μητρός μου) – lyrics Georgios Viziinos, Thodoris Ghonis
- 1999: Nikos Xydakis (Νίκος Ξυδάκης) – Sokratis Malamas with lyrics by Michalis Ghanas, Thodoris Ghonis)
- 2000: Theatrical 6 CD Box with compositions for theater
- 2003: Nikos Xydakis – Glass Music Theatre with Nikos Portokaloglou, Pantelis Thalassinos, Eleftheria Arvanitaki, Melina Kana and others
- 2004: Three Unities – with Vassilis Rakopoulos
- 2005: Second Calendar (Δεύτερο ημερολόγιο)
- 2006: Hurry up, Time is over (Γρήγορα Η Ώρα Πέρασε) – Eleftheria Arvanitaki, lyrics by Sappho, Odysseas Elytis, Dionysus Kapsalis and Kostas Kariotakis)
