= Armenia (album) =

Studio album by Vasilis Papakonstantinou
- Released: 1979
- Studio: Studio ERA, Athens
- Label: MINOS
- Producer: Haris Tsakmatsian

Vasilis Papakonstantinou chronology
Vasilis Papakonstantinou (1978)	Armenia (1979)	Atreides (1980)

Armenia is Vasilis Papakonstantinou's second album. It was somewhat a departure from his debut and a return to the more politically oriented song cycles recorded with Mikis Theodorakis and Thomas Bakalakos. Instead of interpreting the songs of a known composer, however, in this album Papakonstantinou chose to record a series of traditional songs from Armenia with a political-revolutionary content. The lyrics were freely translated and adapted to Greek by the well-known lyricist Lefteris Papadopoulos and the music was arranged and conducted by Tzik Nakasian.

== Track listing ==
No.	Title	Lyrics	Music	Length
1.	"Matomeno lavaro [Airounot Trosh]"	trad. arr. Lefteris Papadopoulos	trad.	2:38
2.	"Vrontisan ta volia [Kntag vorodats]"	trad. arr. Papadopoulos	trad.	2:28
3.	"Thrinos gia ton Fenta Kery [Kery]"	trad. arr. Papadopoulos	trad.	3:35
4.	"Pligomenos Feda [Verkerov li tchan Feda]"	trad. arr. Papadopoulos	trad.	2:55
5.	"Feda [Fedai]"	trad. arr. Papadopoulos	trad.	5:10
6.	"Armeniko choma [Armenian]"	trad. arr. Papadopoulos	trad.	1:47
7.	"Xypna lae [Zardir lao]"	trad. arr. Papadopoulos	trad.	2:01
8.	"Bank Otoman [Bank Otoman]"	trad. arr. Papadopoulos	trad.	2:30
9.	"Zito zito [Houra-Houra]"	trad. arr. Papadopoulos	trad.	2:16
10.	"Empros ethnomartyres [Haratch nahadak]"	trad. arr. Papadopoulos	trad.	2:20
