= Gia Olous =

Studio album by Giannis Kalatzis
- Released: April 1981
- Recorded: Athens, studio Polysound, 1981
- Genre: World music, Folk, Modern Laika
- Length: 34:05
- Language: Greek
- Label: Minos EMI
- Producer: Ilias Benetos

Giannis Kalatzis chronology
Pali Konta Sou (1979)	Gia Olous (1981)	Thymithite Me Ton Gianni Kalatzi (1984)

Gia olous… O Giannis Kalatzis se tragoudia tou Toli Voskopoulou ke Nikou Lavranou (Greek: Για όλους… Ο Γιάννης Καλατζής σε τραγούδια του Τόλη Βοσκόπουλου και Νίκου Λαβράνου; For all… Giannis Kalatzis in songs of Tolis Voskopoulos and Nikos Lavranos) is the name of a studio album by Greek singer Giannis Kalatzis. It was released in April, 1981 by Minos EMI in Greece. This album was issued in mono and stereo. The stereo version of this album was released on CD in the 1990s by Minos EMI.

== Track listing ==
Side one.

1. "Mera – mera, mina – mina" feat. Marinella - (Tolis Voskopoulos-Varvara Tsimpouli) – 2:48 – (Greek: Μέρα – μέρα, μήνα – μήνα)
2. "Zali – zali" - (Tolis Voskopoulos-Varvara Tsimpouli) – 2:01 – (Greek: Ζάλη – ζάλη)
3. "Zitianaki" feat. Marinella - (Tolis Voskopoulos-Varvara Tsimpouli) – 3:29 – (Greek: Ζητιανάκι)
4. "Ti na tin kanei ti zoi" - (Tolis Voskopoulos-Varvara Tsimpouli) – 3:16 – (Greek: Τι να την κάνει τη ζωή)
5. "Panayia mou" feat. Marinella - (Tolis Voskopoulos-Varvara Tsimpouli) – 3:11 – (Greek: Παναγιά μου)
6. "Dio feggaria" feat. Marinella - (Tolis Voskopoulos-Mimis Theiopoulos) – 3:13 – (Greek: Δυο φεγγάρια)

Side two.

1. "Ase to nazi" - (Nikos Lavranos-Varvara Tsimpouli) – 3:01 – (Greek: Άσε το νάζι)
2. "To 'na spiti dipla st' allo" feat. Marinella - (Tolis Voskopoulos-Varvara Tsimpouli) – 3:00 – (Greek: Το 'να σπίτι δίπλα στ' άλλο)
3. "Avrio tis to leo" feat. Marinella - (Tolis Voskopoulos-Varvara Tsimpouli) – 2:28 – (Greek: Αύριο της το λέω)
4. "Na methisoume" - (Tolis Voskopoulos-Mimis Theiopoulos) – 3:46 – (Greek: Να μεθύσουμε)
5. "Mia zoi" - (Tolis Voskopoulos-Varvara Tsimpouli) – 2:36 – (Greek: Μια ζωή)
6. "Min argis" - (Nikos Lavranos-Varvara Tsimpouli) – 2:36 – (Greek: Μην αργείς)

== Personnel ==
- Giannis Kalatzis – vocals, background vocals
- Marinella – background vocals
- Ilias Benetos – producer
- Nikos Lavranos – arranger, conductor
- Gavrilis Pantzis – recording engineer
- Alinta Mavrogeni – photographer
