= Yiorgos Kaloudis =

Greek cellist and Cretan lyra player (born 1973)

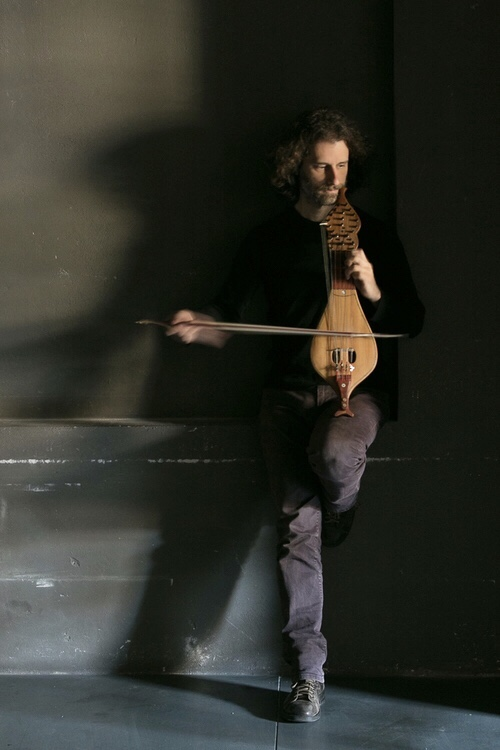

Background information
- Born: 1974 (age 51–52); Athens, Greece
- Origin: Athens, Greece
- Genres: classical; ambient; world
- Occupations: Cellist; Cretan lyra player; Composer
- Instruments: Cello, Classical Cretan Lyra
- Years active: 1993–present
- Label: Dna Label
- Website: yiorgoskaloudismusic.com, classicalcretanlyra.com

Yiorgos Kaloudis (born in 1973) is a Greek cellist and Cretan lyra player.

== Biography ==
Born in Athens, Kaloudis grew up in families of musical origin (Crete & Corfu). He lived and experienced music from his parents and families, which included many musicians from various genres and styles of music. Therefore, most symphonic instruments of the orchestra were available to him at an early age, as well as traditional musical instruments. He started playing piano and drums with his parents, but his love was focused on the stringed musical instruments. First with the Cretan Lyra, the Mandolin and the Guitar from his grandparents, continuing the family tradition as the fourth generation of Lyra players, and then the Cello, as the third generation in the violin family.

=== Athletic career ===
From 1988 to December 1997, he was a member of the Greek National Track and Field Team, competing in the 5 km, 10 km and 20 km racewalking events. In 1990, at the International Race Walking Meeting in Czechoslovakia he established the national record in a 20 km walk (Juniors category), which was beaten only after 22 years (2012). In 1991 at the European Championships (Junior) held in Thessaloniki, with the name Yeóryios Papagiannakis, he got the 12th position in the 10 km indoor walk. He is still today one of the top 20 performers in the history of Greek race walking.

=== Musical career ===
Yiorgos Kaloudis studied Cello at the Athenaeum Conservatory with Claire Demeulenere and, thanks to the Fulbright Program, in Los Angeles under the tutelage of Ted Greene. He also studied Cello for a year with Renato Ripo in Athens, and with Vitaliy Maltese in Rethymnon.

Before publishing as a solo artist he was a member of Greek jazz-fusion group Occasional Dream (Περιστασιακό Όνειρο).

His solo discography consists of five records: Truth (2005), On the Wind (2009), J.S.BACH: Cello Suites on the Cretan lyra (2016-2017), Aptera (2018) and Driopi (2020).

He performed the Cello suites of Bach with the Cretan lyra, maintaining the tonalities of the original work. This was the very first time that a Greek traditional instrument interpreted classical music. The Lyra he used to play suites a special four-string instrument (with an added low C string ) that was designed and built solely for this purpose.

The concerts of Yiorgos Kaloudis feature an extensive use of live loop recording and a combination of elements from classical, ambient, jazz and world music.

In July 2017, he re-opened the ancient theatre of Aptera in Crete, that after almost 1700 years was hosting its first event.

Beyond being a solo artist, he also collaborates on the projects of songwriter Alkinoos Ioannidis. Since 2011 they give concerts together in many venues, churches and concert halls around the world. As a soloist he collaborated with the Saint Petersburg Philharmonic Orchestra and the Royal Scottish National Orchestra. He performed in New York International Fringe Festival, Rome Biennale for Young Artists, in Manchester Jazz Festival and in Celtic Connections among the others.

He played along with Steve Tavaglione, Sylvan Richardson, Karine Polwart, Markus Stockhausen, saxophonist David Lynch, pianists Stavros Lantsias, Takis Farazis, and the groups Lemoncello, Faros, Furtuna and The Chosen.

== Discography ==
=== Solo albums ===
- 2005 - Truth (Dna Label)
- 2009 - On The Wind (Dna Label)
- 2016 - J.S. BACH Cello Suites on the Cretan Lyra (World Premier Recording, Dna Label)
- 2017 - J.S. BACH Cello Suites on the Cretan Lyra (World Premier Recording, Dna Label)
- 2018 - Aptera (Dna Label)
- 2020 - Driopi (Dna Label)

=== With Occasional Dream ===
- 2001 – Peristasiako Oneiro (Περιστασιακό Όνειρο) (Lyra, Mikros Iros)

=== with Furtuna ===
- 2007 - Furtuna (KAF Müzik)
