= Toumba (Thessaloniki) =

Neighborhood of Thessaloniki, Greece

Coordinates: 40.6150°N 22.9710°E

Toumba (Greek: Τούμπα) is a district in eastern Thessaloniki, Greece. It is densely built-up and is divided into Ano Toumba and Kato Toumba (Upper and Lower Toumba) by a flume, and it is part of 4th Division of Thessaloniki Municipality.

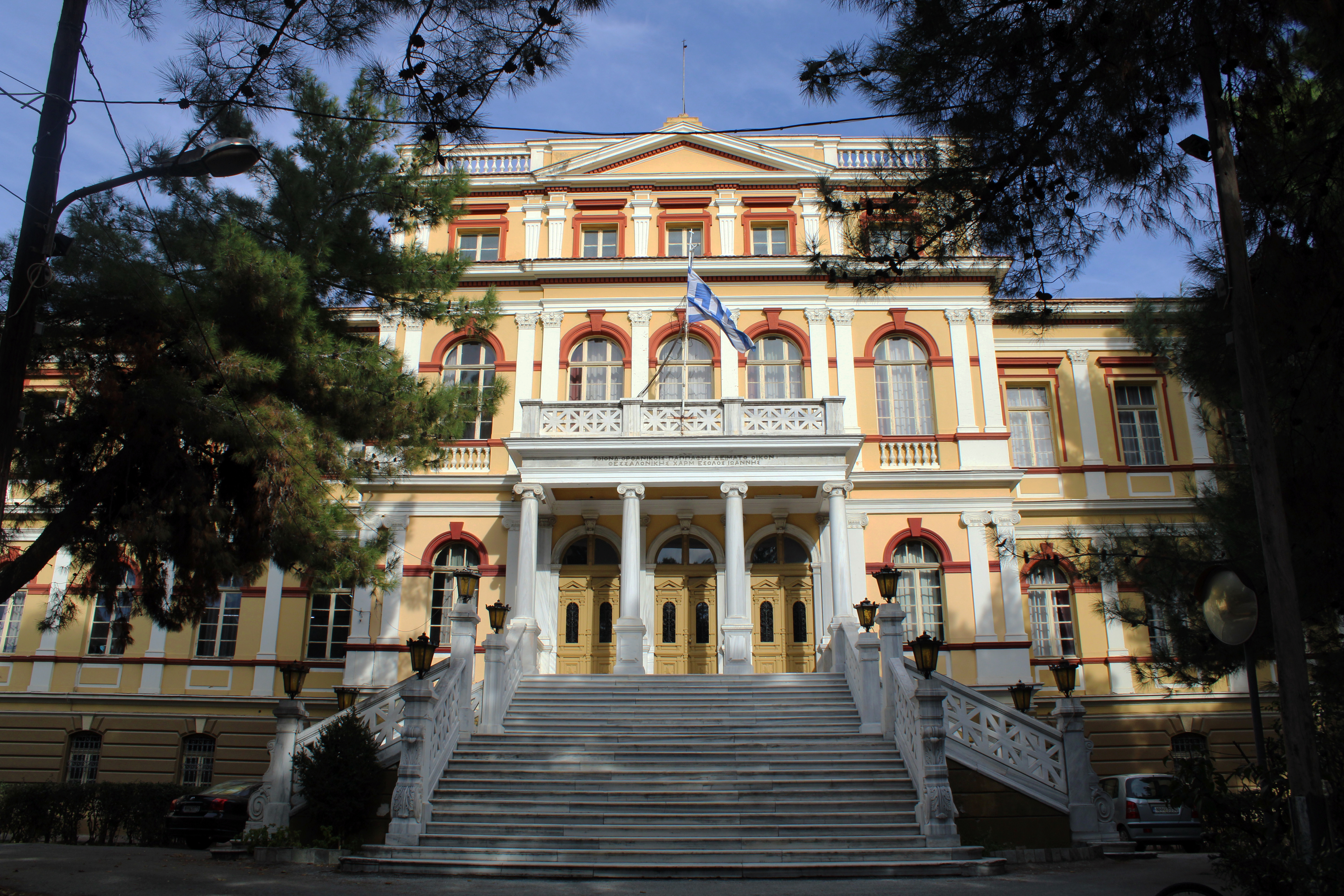
Papafeio Orphanage

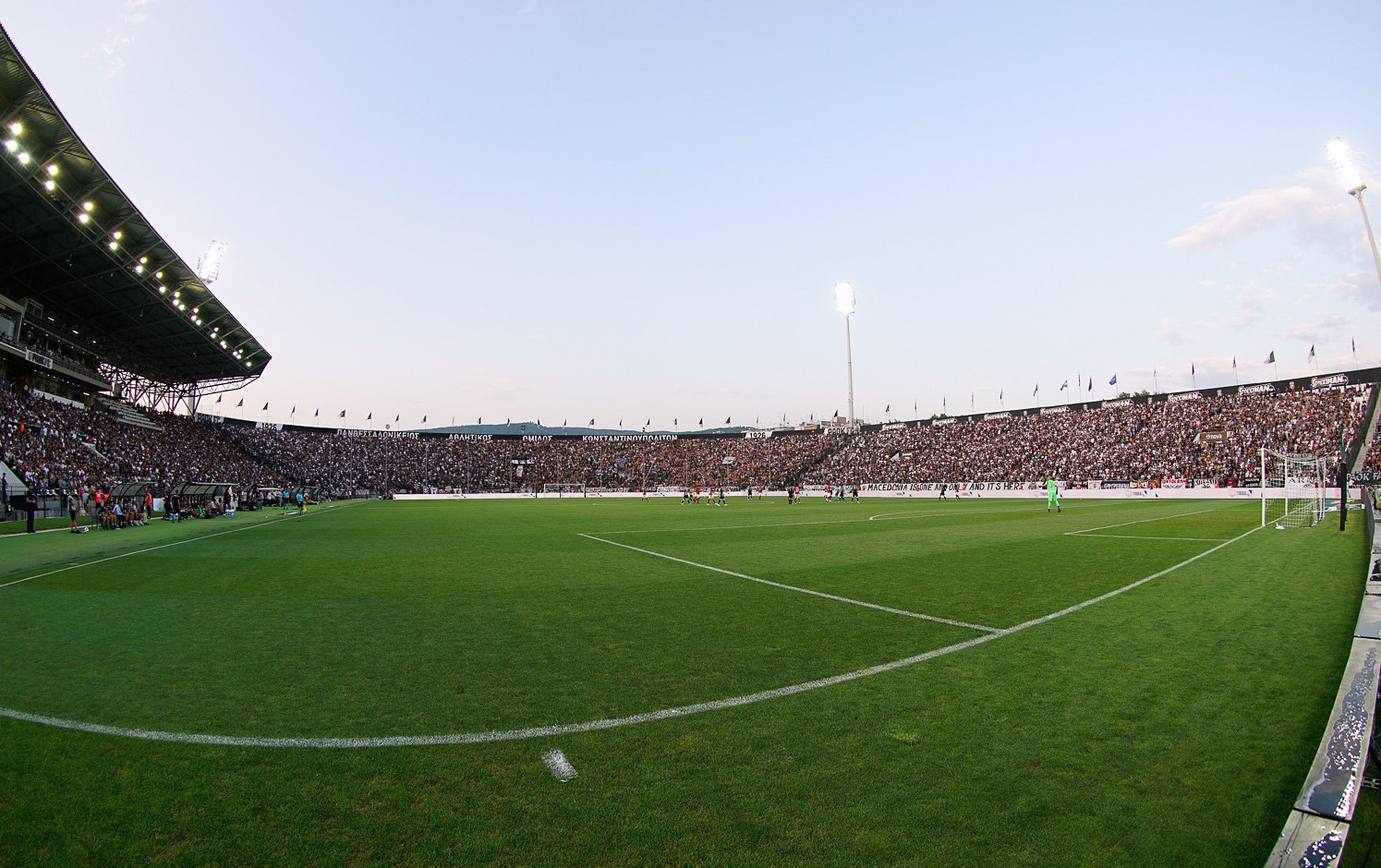
Toumba Stadium, home ground of PAOK FC

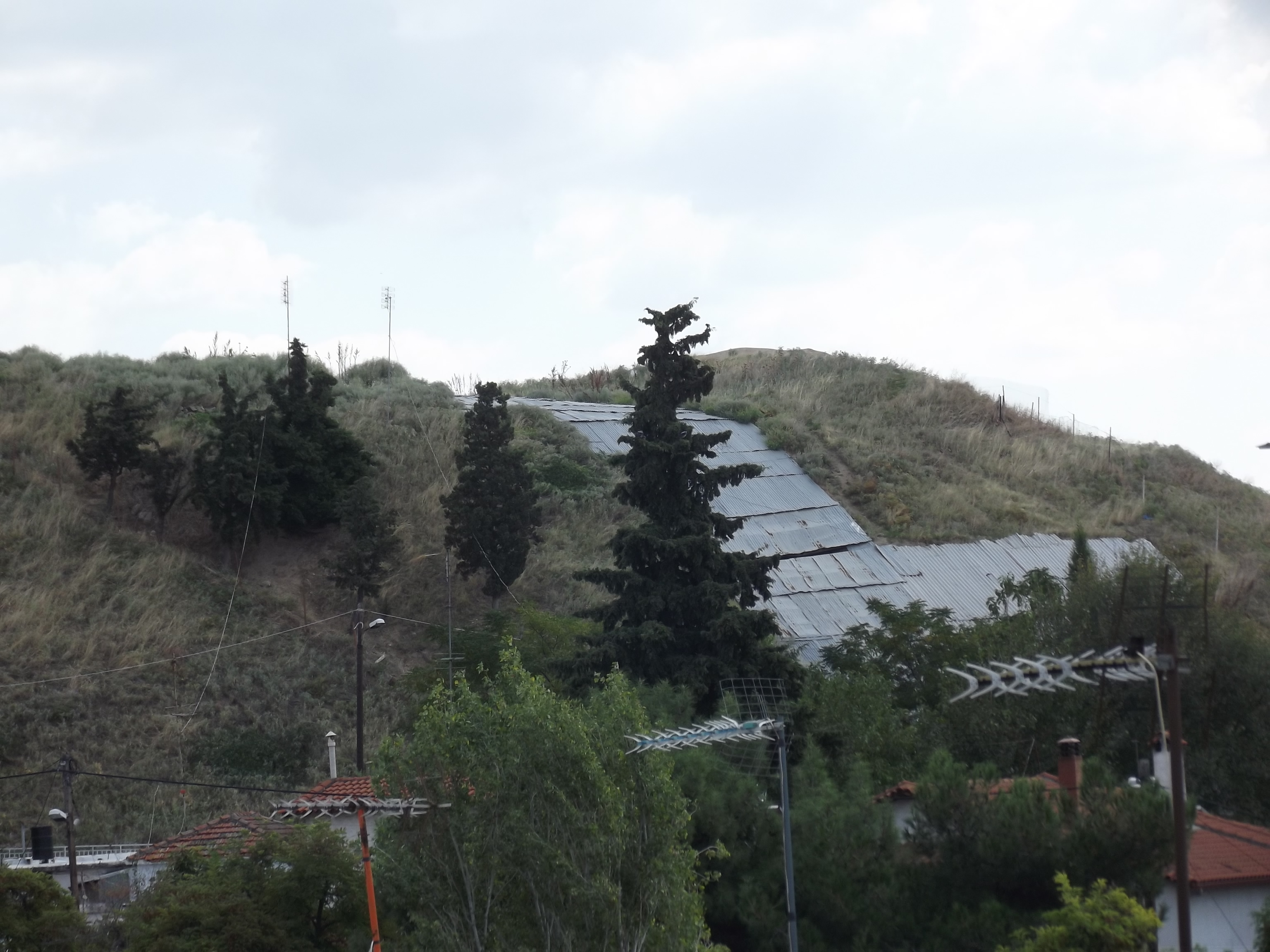
Excavation site

In archaeology the term Toumba stands for the mounds created by prehistoric settlements. They were mistaken for barrows, hence the name that is derived from the word tomb, but excavations show that they are tells. The mound that rises in the area gave the neighbourhood its name.

== The archaeological site ==
The archaeological site consists of 1) a steep-sided mound or tell ('Toumba' in Modern Greek) and 2) a low table (Trapeza) spreading around its base. Both toumba and table are the product of centuries of human habitation as debris layers built up with the passage of time. The Toumba was occupied principally during the Bronze and Early Iron Ages (3000-700 BC, while the Table was occupied from the Early Iron Age through the Archaic, Classical and Hellenistic periods (c 800-200 BC). This community might be identified as Ancient Therma or part of it. Therma, along with 25 other villages, was united by Cassander, in order to form Thessaloniki in 315 BC (Stravon VII 21 & 24).

The excavations are still in progress, conducted by the Aristotle University of Thessaloniki (on the Toumba) and the Greek Archaeological Service (on the Table). Both excavations have made and continue to make important contributions to understanding the nature of human activity in the prehistoric and early historic periods in Central Macedonia and the Thermaic Gulf.

== Modern district ==
The modern district of Toumba was created mostly by Greek refugees from Asia Minor and Constantinople after 1922, as in the area there were mostly fields and few houses until their coming. Musician Nikos Papazoglou lived in this district.

A massive constructive development in the area took place during the late 1970s and 1980s.

== Sports clubs ==
Notable sport clubs based in Toumba
Club	Founded	Sports	Achievements
P.A.O.K.	1926	Multi-sports	Panhellenic titles in football, basketball, volleyball, handball. Two European Cups in basketball. Most time winners in women's football
M.E.N.T. B.C.	1926	Basketball	Presence in A1 Basketball

== PAOK FC Stadium ==
The Toumba neighborhood hosts the home stadium of PAOK FC, which bears the same name, Toumba Stadium.

== Streets ==
- Botsari Street
- Lambraki Street
- Mikras Asias Street
- Papafi Street
- Vosporou Street
- Anatolikis Thrakis Street
- Agias Marinas Street
- Amfipoleos Street
- Perraivou Street
- Lesvou Street
- Pylaias Street
- Artakis Street
- Kleanthous Street
