= Giorgos Mitsakis =

Greek composer and lyricist

Giorgos Mitsakis (Greek: Γιώργος Μητσάκης; 1921 in Constantinople – 17 November 1993 in Athens) was a Greek composer and lyricist of numerous rebetika and folk songs, as well as a skillful bouzouki player. He was also known by the nickname the teacher (ο Δάσκαλος).

== Biography ==
Mitsakis was born in Constantinople,^{[a]} Ottoman Empire, where he spent his early years. Despite that the Greeks of Constantinople were exempted from the population exchange of 1923, the hostile attitude by Turkish people towards them forced his family to immigrate to Greece. Thus, in 1935 they moved to Kavala and later to Αfissos, a fishing village near Volos. In Greece, Mitsakis was introduced to popular music and started to take music lessons. Against the will of his father who wanted him to become a fisherman, Mitsakis in 1937 fled to Thessaloniki where he met Vassilis Tsitsanis, Apostolos Hatzichristos and attended performances by Markos Vamvakaris.

Mitsakis moved once again in 1939, ending up in the port city of Piraeus. There, he started to perform professionally and met many of the prominent rebetiko singers and musicians of the time. Mitsakis composed his first songs in early 1941, however the soon to come German occupation prevented him from producing any recordings until 1946. After the war, Mitsakis cooperated with artists such as Giannis Papaioannou, Manolis Chiotis and Apostolos Kaldaras and quickly rose to fame. During the 1950s, he worked with important singers such as Stelios Perpiniadis, Stratos Pagioumtzis, Anna Hrisafi, Sotiria Bellou, Marika Ninou, Stella Haskil and Keti Grey. His successful career continued in the 1960s, during which he worked with Grigoris Bithikotsis, Spyros Zagoraios, Manolis Angelopoulos, Stratos Dionysiou, Stelios Kazantzidis, Marinella, Poly Panou, Yiota Lydia, as well as younger singers such as Giannis Kalatzis and Giorgos Dalaras.

Mitsakis wrote over 700 songs that are officially registered under his name and numerous more that he gave away to others. Many of these songs continue to be highly popular today, holding him a special place in rebetiko and Laïkó genres.

== Notes ==
1. ^a Officially renamed to Istanbul only later, in 1930.
