= Stavros Kouyioumtzis =

Greek composer

Stavros Kouyioumtzis (also Kougioumtzis; Greek: Σταύρος Κουγιουμτζής [ˈstavro̞s kuʝumˈd͡zis]; 23 July 1932 – 12 March 2005) is one of the most significant Greek music composers of the 20th century.

== Biography ==
Kouyioumtzis was born in Thessaloniki in 1932. His family were refugees from Asia Minor. He wrote his first song in 1960. quickly becoming a prolific writer, whose work was covered by many of the leading Greek singers. In the late 1960s, he began working with the then 19-year-old George Dalaras. He wrote Dalaras' first songs and helped establish Dalaras as one of the most important and successful Greek singers of all time.

Kouyioumtzis' songs have been covered by many important Greek singers, inclouding; Anna Vissi, Haris Alexiou, Yiannis Parios, Eleftheria Arvanitaki and Giannis Kalatzis. Aside from his solo compositions, Kouyioumtzis co-operated frequently with the poet-lyricist Manos Eleftheriou.

Kouyioumtzis' songs are regarded as top-quality music in Greece. Both his solo writing as well as his co-writing with Manos Eleftheriou. His songs resonated deeply with Greeks in the sixties, exploring themes of love, poverty and the agonies faced by the poor in living with dignity. According to lyricist Lefteris Papadopoulos, Kouyioumtzis "followed the music spirit which was dominant in Greece during the last 25 years (from 1965 to 1990) through the music of Mikis Theodorakis and Manos Hadjidakis".

Kouyioumtzis is remembered as a character of calm disposition, widely respected and held in the highest esteem by many, both in the field of Greek music as well as Greeks in general. A bashful character, it is characteristic that Kouyioumtzis preferred privacy over celebrity. Media appearances were infrequent, except on special occasions. His last appearance on television was in the entertainment music show of Spyros Papadopoulos on NET TV. During his last few years, he left his Athens home and returned to his birthplace, Thessaloniki, where he continued working on music and songs until he died suddenly on 12 March 2005 in the Kalamaria suburbs. His funeral took place at the Cathedral in the Municipality of Kalamaria and he was buried at the cemetery of Kalamaria, in East Thessaloniki.

== Works ==
Some of Kouyioumtzis' most famous songs are:

- Pou 'ne ta chronia (Where are the years gone by)
- Mi mu thymonis matia mou (Don't be angry with me, my love)
- Enas kompos i chara mou (One drop is all my joy)
- Natane to 21 (If it was 1821)
- To kokkino foustani (The red dress)
- Kapou nichtoni (Somewhere the night is falling)
- Sta chronia tis ypomonis (In the times of patience)
- Sta psila ta parathyria (At the highly window s)
- Kapios chtypise tin porta (Someone knocked on the door)
- Chronia san vrochi (Years like rain)
- I eleftheri ke orei (Those free and beautiful)
- Kapion allon filises (You kissed someone else)
- Matia mou, matia mou (Oh thou dear as my eyes)
- Ta chrei tis kardias sou (Your heart's debts)
- Ola kala (Everything is all right)
