= Pilli Bebek =

Turkish rock band

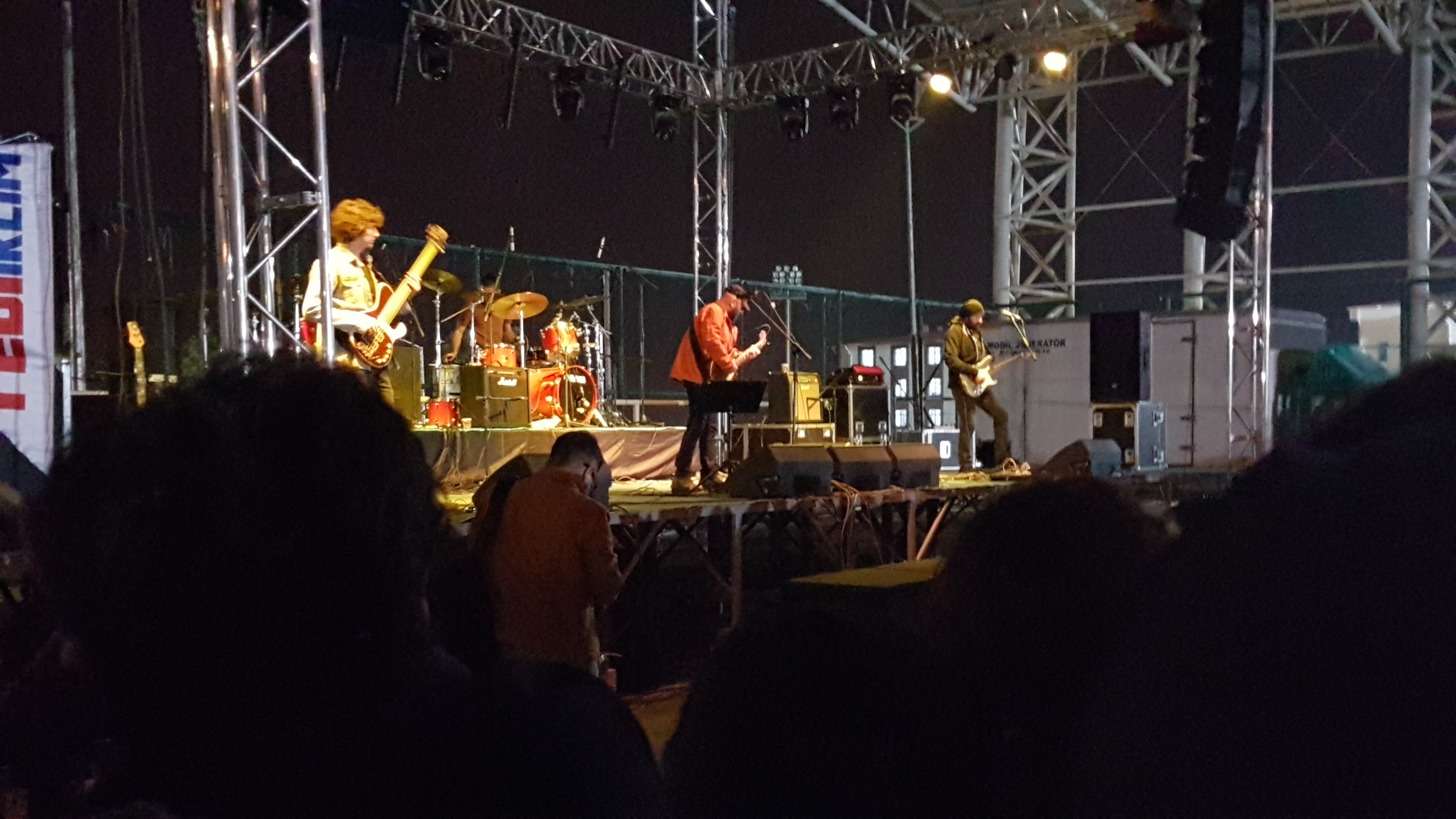

Background information
- Origin: Ankara, Turkey
- Genres: Alternative rock
- Years active: 1993-present
- Labels: Aşk Müzik Yapım
- Members: Cem Kısmet (vocals and guitar); Emre Yalçıntaş (guitar); Çağlar Aytan (drums); Can Yücel Korkut (bass guitar)
- Past members: Alican Narman (bass guitar and backing vocals); Sonat Özer (percussion); Evren Karakul (keyboard); Cudi Genç (bass guitar)
- Website: www.pillibebek.com.tr

Pilli Bebek (English: Battery Baby) is a Turkish rock band formed in Ankara in 1993. The band has been in continuous existence since 1993 and has performed more than 1600 live shows in 42 cities. While Pilli Bebek is influenced by many genres ranging from heavy metal to Turkish art music, Scandinavian popular music to Latin music, they find themselves conceptually close to the Barcarolle style. The band's name comes from the popular children's program Torchy the Battery Boy (broadcast as Pilli Bebek in Turkish) shown on TRT in the early 1970s. Although the band was founded in Ankara, Turkey, it relocated to Istanbul after the Ankara street children beheading tragedy.

The band is known for composing the music for the hit TV series Behzat Ç, with the music for the series being usually taken from the album "Olsun".

== History ==
The foundations of Pilli Bebek were laid in 1992 by Cem Kısmet and Ahmet Başbağlar. The duo started out by giving concerts at bars and pubs mainly located on Sakarya Street, one of the most visited streets in Ankara, and although the band went quiet for a while after Kısmet's military service, it became active again after Kısmet came back and Sonat Özer joined the band.

The band was renamed to Pilli Bebek in 1995.

In January 2000, the band released its first album "Uyandırmadan" under the Aşk Müzik Yapım label, apart from Kısmet and Başbağlar, the album also featured Gürcan Konanç on drums. In addition to nine songs, the album also included a interpretation of Selçuk Alagöz's Malabadi Köprüsü.

As the band started recording their second album "Olsun", their line-up changed. With Başbağlar leaving the band, Cudi Genç replaced him as the bands bass guitarist and Onur Ertem replaced Konanç on drums.

In 2010, up-and-coming Turkish television series Behzat Ç. Bir Ankara Polisiyesi, signed a deal with Pilli Bebek for the series music. As songs from the album Olsun were used extensively, Kısmet started to write new songs similar to that of those in the Olsun album. These songs, which total up to 10 were collected in the first Behzat Ç. songs album released in 2012. Half of the songs in the album were new interpretations of old songs, while the other half consisted of one cover (Nilüfer's Haram Geceler) and four new songs.

In May 2024, the group released the album "Çekiç ve Gül: Bir Behzat Ç Hikayesi (Original TV Series Soundtrack)", consisting of 11 songs, all of which are interpretations of the songs in the first Behzat Ç. songs album. The album was made for the Turkish web series Çekiç ve Gül: Bir Behzat Ç. Hikayesi.

On 8 June 2024, the group released the album "Ankara Yanıyor Behzat Ç. Film Müzikleri" consisting of 20 songs.

On 13 June 2024, Pilli Bebek released the album Kuduz Düğünü consisting of 20 songs.

== Band members ==
- Cem Kısmet – Vocals, guitar (1992-)
- Emre Yalçıntaş – Guitar, backing vocals (2008-)
- Çağlar Aytan – Drums (2015-)
- Can Yücel Korkut – (2018-)

=== Former members ===
- Ahmet Başbağlar – Bass guitar (1992–2000)
- Cudi Genç – Bass guitar (2000–2012)
- Alican Narman – Bass guitar (2012–2015)
- Gürcan Konanç – Drums (1999–2003)
- Burak Yavaş – Drums (2006–2008)
- Emre Günaydın – Drums (2012–2015)
- Ozan Erkan – Guitar
- Evren Karakul – Keyboard
- Sonat Özer – Percussion
- Arda Algan – Bass guitar (2015–2018)

== Discography ==
=== Albums ===
- Uyandırmadan (1999)
- Olsun (2007)
- Behzat Ç. songs (2012)
- Elektro Akustik Konstelasyon (2018)

=== Singles ===
- Özgürlük (2012)
- Bu Biçim (2016)
- Çoğu Zaman (2017)
- Bu Sen Misin (2019)
- Kızıl Gerdan (2020)
- Mavi Sahne (2020)
