= Litsa Diamanti =

Greek laïko singer

Litsa Diamanti Λίτσα Διαμάντη
- Born: Euaggelia Cosmidou; 4 April 1949 (age 77)
- Genres: Laiko, Rebetiko
- Occupation: Singer
- Years active: 1965–present

Litsa Diamanti (Greek: Λίτσα Διαμάντη, born Euaggelia (Evangelitsa-Litsa) Cosmidou; 4 April 1949 in Kolonos, Athens) is a Greek laïko singer who became famous in the 1960s and 1970s. She has been described as the "child-wonder of the Sixties decade and the absolute diva of metapolitefsi." Her hits have been described as "all-time classics."

== Life and career ==
Diamanti was born in 1949 in Kolonos, a suburb of Athens. She finished her schooling in Aegaleo. Her music career started early. At the age of 8 she learned to play the accordion and at 12 she was a member of a music group singing demotic songs. When she was 12 she published her first record An April evening (Ένα δειλινό του Απρίλη) with the Do Re record company. At the age of 13 she had already signed her first record contract with the Minos label which at the time was known as "Odeon Parlofon."

In her early career with Minos she performed as vocal accompaniment for the stars of the company. Famous composer Giorgos Mitsakis gave her her first hit when she was 15 Synnefies (Clouds). From then on she performed a series of hits which became milestones of Greek laiko.

Her collaboration with Greek stars Vasilis Vasiliadis, Bambis Tsetinis, Dimitris Eustathiou and Manos Papadakis produced many hits and led to successful live performances. She also collaborated with famous female singer of the era Poly Panou, an experience she would describe as highly educational.

Her work with Stelios Kazantzidis produced many hits. She also worked with lyricist Pythagoras and composer Giorgos Katsaros, while appearing at Neraida, a famous bouzouki establishment in Athens. Her collaboration with the two composers produced the hit song Den iparhei eftyhia (Δεν υπάρχει ευτυχία - There is no happiness). This hit was followed by another classic "Nyhta stasou" (Night, stay still) composed by Katsaros with lyrics by Christos Nikolopoulos.

Diamanti has also collaborated with Giorgos Dalaras, Giannis Kalatzis and Yiannis Parios in the album "Synantisis" by Greek composer Evangelos Sempos.
