= Alkinoos Ioannidis =

Greek-Cypriot musician (born 1969)

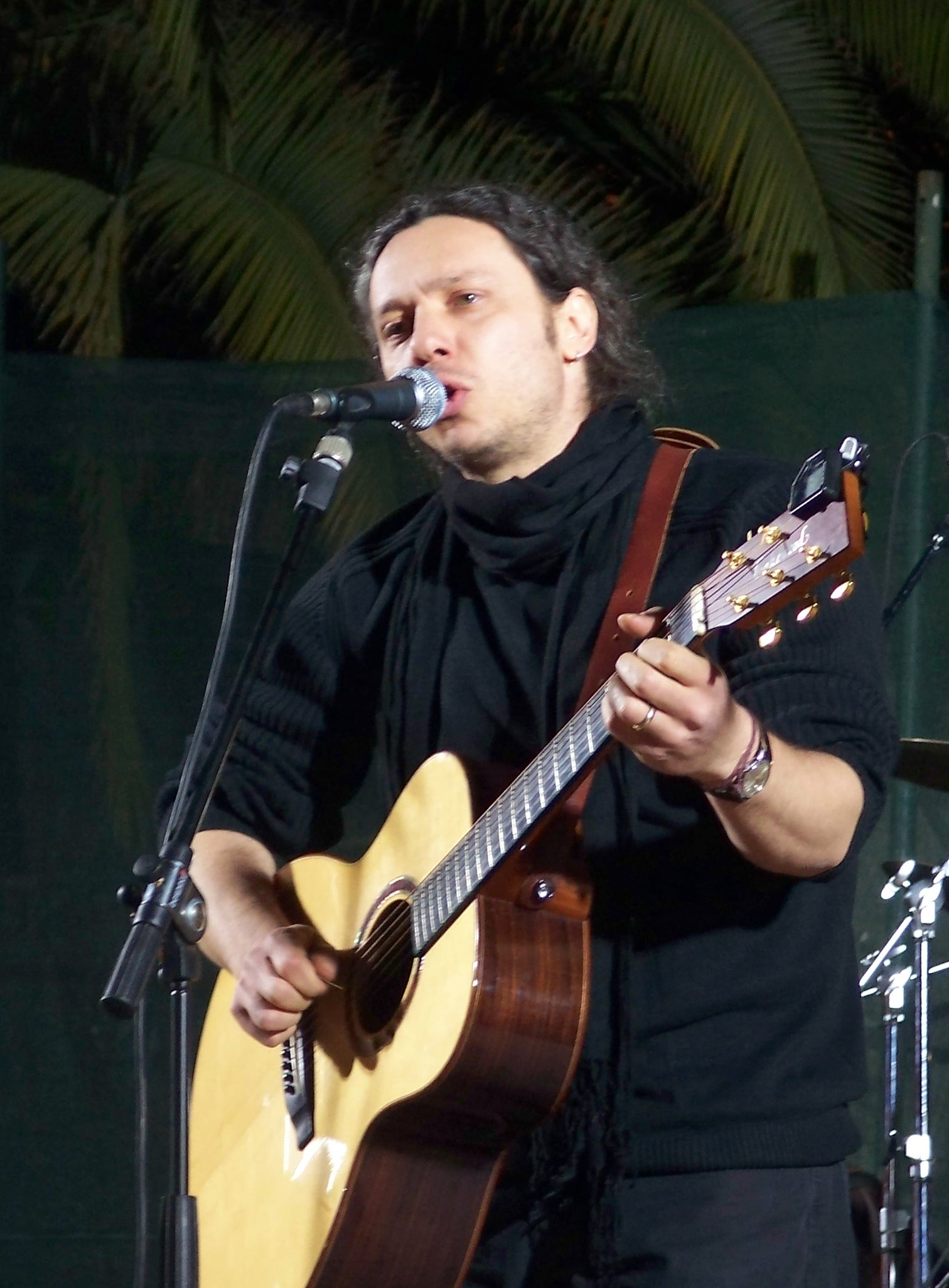
- Alkinoos Ioannidis, December 2008

Background information
- Born: 19 September 1969 (age 56); Nicosia, Cyprus
- Genres: Entehno
- Years active: 1993–present
- Label: Universal Music Greece (1993–present)
- Website: http://www.alkinoos.gr/

Alkinoos Ioannidis (Greek: Αλκίνοος Ιωαννίδης; born 19 September 1969) is a Greek Cypriot composer, lyricist, singer, and orchestrator.

== Biography ==
He was born in Nicosia on 19 September 1969 to a Greek Cypriot father and a Greek mother. His artistic family, with a painter father and poet brother was a source of inspiration for him. He first wanted to study drums, but couldn't do so due to the lack of a drum teacher in Nicosia. Instead, he studied guitar.

For the first 20 years of his life, he lived in a Nicosia suburb. After his military service, he went off to Greece to study theatre. He also entered the School of Philosophy, University of Athens, which he later gave up. He was more successful in his theatre studies where he played some major roles in well known Greek tragedies such as Alcestis.

At the age of 23 he recorded his first album called Stin Agora Tou Kosmou (Greek: Στην Αγορά Του Κόσμου, In The World's Market) with lyrics and music written by Nikos Zoudiaris. This demo tape eventually reached the hands of a well known singer, Dimitra Galani. She instantly became fond of their music and Alkinoos' voice and helped them get a record deal.

Alkinoos and Zoudiaris followed with another album called Opos Mistika Kai Isicha (Greek: Οπως Μυστικά Και Ήσυχα, As Secretly and Quietly). Both albums turned gold.

From 1993 to 1997 he toured frequently in support of other artists, including one of the most important female figures of Greek music, Eleftheria Arvanitaki.

In 1997, his first self-penned album, O Dromos, O Hronos Kai O Ponos (Greek: Ο Δρόμος Ο Χρόνος Και Ο Πόνος, The Road, The Time and The Pain), was released to critical praise. The cover was painted by his father. His subsequent albums have also had their covers painted by his father.

In 1999 he released another self-penned album, Anemodiktis (Greek: Ανεμοδείκτης, Weather Vane).

In 2000 he released a double-disc live album Ektos Topou kai Xronou (Greek: Εκτός τόπου και χρόνου, Out of Space and Time).

In 2003, he released Oi Peripeties enos Proskiniti (Greek: Οι περιπέτειες ενός προσκυνητή, The Adventures of a Pilgrim). It was a popular and critical hit.

In April 2006, he released an album of Cypriot folk songs titled Pou Disin Os Anatolin (Greek:΄Πού Δύσην Ώς Άνατολήν, From dusk till dawn) with his longtime violinist Miltiadis Papastamou.

On 9 March 2009, he released the album Neroponti (Greek: Νεροποντή, Downpour).

Released in March 2012, Local Stranger is his 12th solo album and examines the “political and economic whirlwind” that has hit Greece in recent months.

In 2014 he released Mikri Valitsa (Greek: Μικρή βαλίτσα, Small Suitcase) dedicated to people who have been forced to leave their homeland and to those who feel their homeland has deserted them and the hardships that refugees face.

Ioannidis rarely appears to give interviews or take part in television shows.

== Concerts ==
Alkinoos regularly performs in Greece and Cyprus and has toured across Europe and around the world including North America (USA, Canada), Australia, Brazil, Russia and Egypt. He has toured as a soloist, with cellist and Cretan lyra player Yiorgos Kaloudis or as a band supported by other notable Greek musicians.

=== Band members ===
- Yiorgos Kaloudis: Acoustic Cello, Cretan Lyra
- Manolis Pappos: Bouzouki, Lute
- Fotis Siotas: Violin
- Dimitris Tsekouras: Double bass
- Alkinoos Ioannidis: Vocals, Acoustic Guitar

Alkinoos Ioannidis performed at Celtic Connections Glasgow's annual folk, roots and world music festival in 2018 and 2014, where he collaborated with Scottish singer-songwriter Karine Polwart to perform The Slaves Lament / St. Marina's Lullaby. They also performed together in Athens in 2013 and with the Cyprus Youth Chorus as part of Pafos European Capital of Culture in September 2017.

In January 2016 Alkinoos Ioannidis was the headline act of the 2016 Lonsdale Street Festival, Melbourne.

In 2020 Alkinoos Ioannidis planned concerts in the US, in New York, Boston, Atlanta and Austin, were postponed due to the COVID-19 pandemic.

== Discography ==
- 1993 Stin Agora Tou Kosmou
- 1995 Opos Mistika Kai Isicha
- 1997 O Dromos, O Hronos Kai O Ponos
- 1999 Anemodiktis
- 2000 Ektos Topou kai Xronou (Live)
- 2003 Oi Peripeties enos Proskiniti
- 2006 Pou Disin Os Anatolin
- 2006 Manos Hadjidakis 4 THEATRICAL MYTHS
- 2006 Synantisi
- 2007 LIVE IN LYCABETTUS (Alexiou - Malamas - Ioannidis)
- 2009 Neroponti
- 2011 Gyalinos Kosmos (Live)
- 2011 Sykomidi (Harvest), a box set of 8 albums containing prints of all the albums’ artwork by Alkinoos’ father
- 2012 Local Stranger (This is a best of album from Alkinoos on Wrasse Records)
- 2014 Mikri Valitsa – Small Suitcase
