= Nikos Papazoglou =

Nikos Papazoglou Νίκος Παπάζογλου
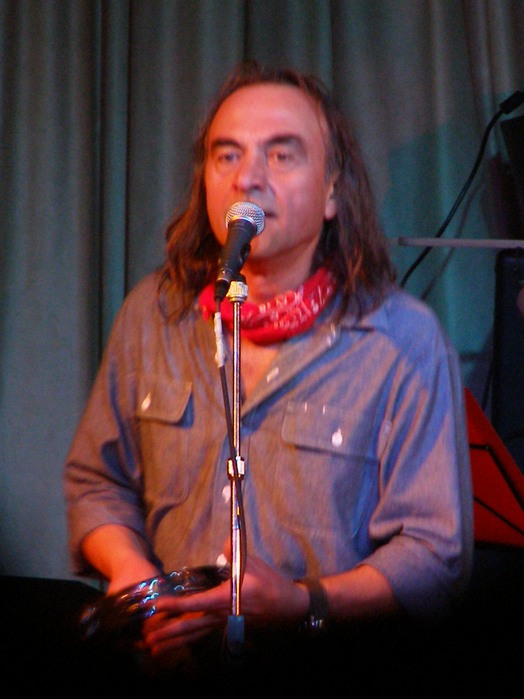
- Papazoglou in 2007

Background information
- Born: 20 March 1948
- Origin: Kormista, Serres Greece
- Died: 17 April 2011 (aged 63)
- Occupations: Singer, songwriter, musician, record producer
- Years active: 1965–2011

Nikolaos "Nikos" Papazoglou (in Greek: Νίκος Παπάζογλου; 20 March 1948 – 17 April 2011) was a Greek singer-songwriter, musician, and producer from Thessaloniki.

Papazoglou began performing in a number of Greek local groups in the 1960s. In 1972, he moved to Aachen, Germany with the group Zilotis (Greek: Ζηλωτής, "Zealot") in an attempt to break into the international music scene. The group recorded six songs in Milan, Italy. Shortly afterwards, he returned to Greece.

In 1976, Greek songwriter Dionysis Savvopoulos invited him to participate in Acharnees, a cycle of songs and stage acts based on the ancient comedy The Acharnians by Aristophanes. There Papazoglou met Manolis Rasoulis and in 1978 the two, along with Dionysis Savvopoulos and Nikos Xydakis, produced the influential Ekdikisi Tis Gyftias (Greek: Εκδίκηση της γυφτιάς, "Revenge of the Gypsies"). The work received critical acclaim. Papazoglou and Rasoulis cooperated the following year on another successful work, Ta Dithen (Τα δήθεν, "The so-called").

Since 1984 the artist organized his tours by himself. He and his band known as Loxi falaga (Greek: Λοξή φάλαγγα, "Oblique order"), played in small venues in villages and on small islands, gaining huge popularity with the general public. His works generated an audience in Europe and America and was very well known as a cult figure with his signature red bandana, the playing of the baglamas and considered a veritable world music figure.

Well-known Nikos Papazoglou songs include: "Κανείς εδώ δεν τραγουδά", "Αχ Ελλάδα", "Αύγουστος", "Οι μάγκες δεν υπάρχουν πια" and "Υδροχόος". Many of his songs have been interpreted by other Greek artists and been sung in various languages, and Papazoglou also performed and popularized the songs of other artists.

Papazoglou was a producer and sound technician to many of the underground rock scene of Greece in the 1980s through his Agrotikon Studio.

He lived in Thessaloniki with his wife and his two children. He died at 17 April 2011 after a long struggle with cancer.

== Discography ==
Album title first in Greek, then English transliteration in parentheses:

- 1978: Η Εκδίκηση της Γυφτιάς (I Ekdikisi tis Gyftias)
- 1984: Χαράτσι (Harátsi)
- 1986: Μέσω Νεφών (Méso Nefón)
- 1990: Σύνεργα (Sínerga)
- 1991: Επιτόπιος ηχογράφησις στο θέατρο του Λυκαβηττού (Epitópios ichográfisis sto theatro tu Lykabittú)
- 1995: Όταν κινδυνεύεις παίξε την πουρούδα (Otan kidinevis paíkse tin puruda)
- 2005: Μάγισσα Σελήνη (Magissa selini)
- 2009: Ήμουν κι εγώ εκεί (Imoun ki ego ekei)
