= Vasilis Papakonstantinou =

Greek musical artist

Vasilis Papakonstantinou Βασίλης Παπακωνσταντίνου
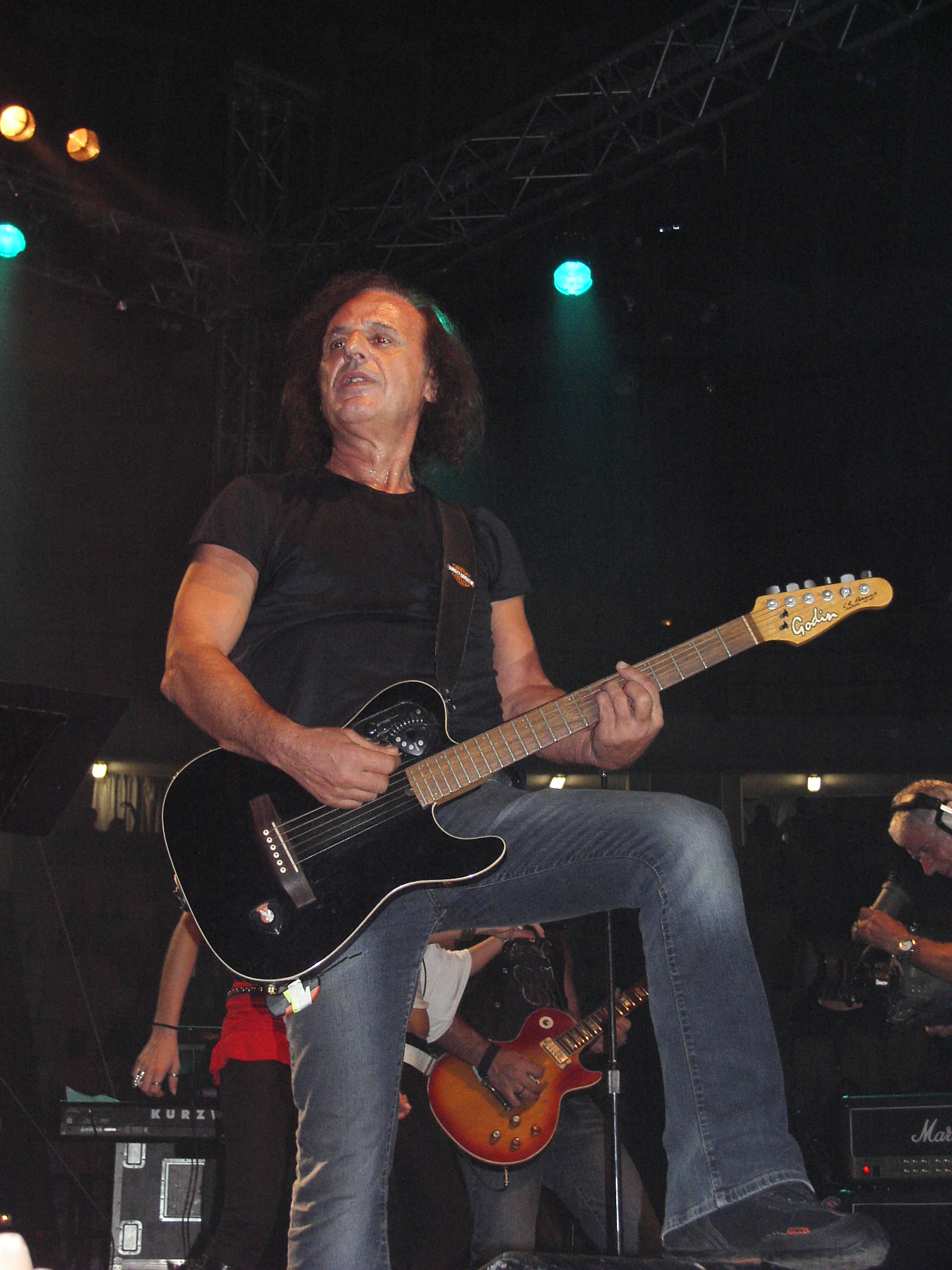
- Vasilis Papakonstantinou in 2007

Background information
- Born: 21 June 1950 (age 76); Vastas, Kingdom of Greece
- Origin: Vastas, Greece
- Genres: Rock folk rock soft rock
- Occupations: Singer, musician, songwriter
- Instruments: Vocals, guitar
- Years active: 1974–present
- Spouse: Eleni Rantou

Vasilis Papakonstantinou (Βασίλης Παπακωνσταντίνου) (born 21 June 1950) is a Greek singer known mostly for his work in Greek rock. Many of his songs have gained considerable popularity, mainly in Greece and Cyprus.

== Early life ==
Vasilis Papakonstantinou was born on 21 June 1950 in Vastas, outside of Megalopolis, Arcadia. In 1957 he moved to Athens along with his family. His adolescence was marked by the musical and social trends of the 1960s: Mikis Theodorakis, protest rock, international peace and liberation movements, while Greece was coping with the aftermath of the Greek Civil War. Vasilis Papakonstantinou became a follower of the left without ever becoming a member of a leftist party. In 1973, after having served in the Hellenic Army, fulfilling his conscription obligations, he moved to West Germany and settled in Munich. There he participated in anti-dictatorship organizations campaigning against the Greek military junta of 1967–1974 and performing in places with a considerable Greek student and immigrant population.

== Career ==
His first musical encounter was with Greek composer and anti-dictatorship firebrand Mikis Theodorakis in the summer of 1974, in Paris, where the composer was living in exile after his release from prison, and their collaboration commenced two years later. In 1974, Vasilis returned to Greece following the fall of the dictatorship and embarked on a professional singing career, singing in clubs, and also recorded a 45 rpm gramophone record. That same year he collaborated on the recording of "Ta Tragoudia tou Dromou" (Songs of the Road) by the famed composer Manos Loïzos.

In 1975, he recorded "Ta Agrotika" (Rural Songs) by Thomas Bakalako. This year marks his beginning collaboration with two composers with whom he would work closely for many years: Manos Loïzos and Thanos Mikroutsikos. Both of them promoted in new manners the songs of the big city without following faithfully the traces of popular or artistic music of earlier famous composers. Papakonstantinou's interpretation was ideal in expressing their dynamism and expressiveness. In 1976 his much anticipated collaboration with Mikis Theodorakis took place in the recording of "Tis Exorias" (Songs of Exile), and in 1978 the composer included Vassilis among the singers who took part in his international tour of Europe, the Americas and Australia. At home Papakonstantinou actively took part in youth and labor movement rallies, singing at strikes, meetings, anti-racist and anti-fascist concerts.

From that time on, just before the 1980s, Papakonstantinou began demonstrating influences from the international rock movement. He performed songs which had an obviously more thick sound and more acute and intervening lyrics. This trend appeared gradually in the two records that he recorded in the early 1980s; the first one was titled after his name and included songs written by Antonis Vardis and adaptations of songs written by Dionysis Savvopoulos, Mikis Theodorakis and Luis Lach. The second one "Fovame" (I fear) with songs composed by Manos Loïzos, Lakis Papadopoulos, Giannis Zouganelis and Giannis Glezos consolidated his profile from that time up to date. He met Nikolas Asimos and took part in his first record "Xanapes" (Say it again) by singing two songs. Assimos became the second person after Loizos, who influenced him a lot with his peculiar personality. In 1984 with his record "Dieresi" (Division) his new sound was finally established. In 1987 he reconfirmed it in "Heretismata" (Greetings) including songs by Nikolas Asimos, Aphrodite Manou, and Christos Tolios and by the mid-1980s Vassilis Papakonstantinou was considered one of Greeces most popular concert performers.

In April 1985, a 16,000 audience attended his first major personal concert at the Peace and Friendship Stadium and again in June 1988 at the Leoforos Alexandras Stadium on Alexandras Avenue. Vasilis, never received any support from the media; even though his era was eroting away as many suggested 8 years ago, however in the 19th festival of EDON, which took place in Cyprus, Vasilis managed to attract a 20,000 tickets sold-out audience, many managed to enter the concert by jumping over the walls and fences raising the attendance to around 23,000. Making it probably the biggest sold-out concert ever made on the island.

He united three generations of fans including a strong following of "educated" adolescent fans. At the end of the 1980s, he interpreted "difficult" songs with lyrics written by Kostas Tripolitis and music by Thanos Mikroutsikos. In between he sang "Chorevo" (I am Dancing) and in the new decade he sang for the second time after 1978 in "Stavros tou Notou" (Southern Cross) songs by Nikos Kavvadias and Thanos Mikroutsikos. Although his songs of the last years follow the sound of "popular" culture he has not hesitated to record LP albums on the verses of two of the most celebrated Greek poets. In 1984 he sang poetry by Kostas Karyotakis in a record named after the poet, and in 1993 "Fissai" (It is Blowing) had verses by Tassos Livaditis and music by Giorgos Tsegaris. He interpreted Nikolas Asimos again in 1992 in "Falimento tou Kosmou" (The end of the World) and in the last decade he made "Sfedona" (Sling). In 1995 he made "The Shikoni" (Impossible) cooperating with Alkis Alkeos, Christophoros Krokides, Vassilis Giannopoulos, Stamatis Mesimeris, Aphrodite Manou, Odysseas Ioannou and Minos Matsas. The last record that hit the market in April 1997 under the title "Pes mou ena Psemma gia na Apokimitho" (Tell me a Lie to Sleep), included songs of Nikolas Asimos, Apostolos Boulassikis (making his first appearance), Stamatis Messimeris, Giannis Ioannou, Vassilis Gianopoulos, Christophoros Krokides, as well as the song, "Malista Kyrie" (Yes Sir) by Giorgos Zampetas and Alekos Kagiantas.

== Discography ==
- 1975 - Ta Agrotika (Rural Songs)
- 1978 - Vasilis Papakonstantinou
- 1979 - Armenia
- 1982 - Fovamai (I'm afraid)
- 1984 - Kariotakis
- 1984 - Diairesi (Division)
- 1985 - H Sinavlia Apo To Neo Falhro (The concert at Neo Faliro)
- 1987 - Hairetismata (Greetings)
- 1987 - Oi Megalyteres Epityhies Tou Vasili (Best of Vasilis)
- 1988 - Ola Apo Heri Kamena (Surely all burned)
- 1989 - Horevo (I'm dancing)
- 1991 - Hronia Polla (Happy Birthday)
- 1992 - Sfentona (Sling)
- 1993 - Fysaei (It's Windy)
- 1994 - De Sikonei
- 1994 - Oi Balantes Tou Vasili (Vasili's ballads)
- 1997 - Pes moy ena psema na apokoimitho (Tell me a lie to fall asleep)
- 1999 - Na Me Fonakseis (Call me)
- 1999 - Thalassa Sti Skala (Sea at the companionway)
- 2000 - Sfentona Live (Sling live)
- 2000 - Chamenes Agapes (Lost Loves)
- 2002 - Prosecho...Dystyhos (I'm careful...unfortunately)
- 2003 - Eseis Oi Filoi Mou Ki Ego (You my friends and I)
- 2004 - Fresko Hioni (Fresh Snow)
- 2007 - Metopiki (Head-On)
- 2008 - Vatomoura (Blackberries)
- 2009 - Ourania Toxa Kinigo (I'm hunting rainbows)
- 2010 - To Paixnidi Paizetai (The game is being played)
- 2012 - Afetiria (Start)
- 2013 - Hartina Desma (Paper restraints)
- 2013 - Drapeths (runaway)
- 2015 - Drapeths 2
- 2016 - To Ypovrichio (The Submarine)
- 2018 - Ola Einai gia Emas
- 2019 - Haragmenes Stigmes
- 2019 - Oi fones ton Poiiton
- 2019 - Mplexame
