= Polytope compound =

3D shape made of polyhedra sharing a common center

In geometry, a polyhedral compound is a figure that is composed of several polyhedra sharing a common centre. They are the three-dimensional analogs of polygonal compounds such as the hexagram.

The outer vertices of a compound can be connected to form a convex polyhedron called its convex hull. A compound is a faceting of its convex hull.

Another convex polyhedron is formed by the small central space common to all members of the compound. This polyhedron can be used as the core for a set of stellations.

== Regular compounds ==
A regular polyhedral compound can be defined as a compound which, like a regular polyhedron, is vertex-transitive, edge-transitive, and face-transitive. Unlike the case of polyhedra, this is not equivalent to the symmetry group acting transitively on its flags; the compound of two tetrahedra is the only regular compound with that property. There are five regular compounds of polyhedra:

Regular compound (Coxeter symbol)	Picture	Spherical	Convex hull	Common core	Symmetry group	Subgroup restricting to one constituent	Dual-regular compound
Two tetrahedra {4,3}[2{3,3}]{3,4}			Cube	Octahedron	*432 [4,3] O_{h}	*332 [3,3] T_{d}	Two tetrahedra
Five tetrahedra {5,3}[5{3,3}]{3,5}			Dodecahedron	Icosahedron	532 [5,3]^{+} I	332 [3,3]^{+} T	Chiral twin (Enantiomorph)
Ten tetrahedra 2{5,3}[10{3,3}]2{3,5}			Dodecahedron	Icosahedron	*532 [5,3] I_{h}	332 [3,3] T	Ten tetrahedra
Five cubes 2{5,3}[5{4,3}]			Dodecahedron	Rhombic triacontahedron	*532 [5,3] I_{h}	3*2 [3,3] T_{h}	Five octahedra
Five octahedra [5{3,4}]2{3,5}			Icosidodecahedron	Icosahedron	*532 [5,3] I_{h}	3*2 [3,3] T_{h}	Five cubes

Best known is the regular compound of two tetrahedra, often called the stella octangula, a name given to it by Kepler. The vertices of the two tetrahedra define a cube, and the intersection of the two define a regular octahedron, which shares the same face-planes as the compound. Thus the compound of two tetrahedra is a stellation of the octahedron, and in fact, the only finite stellation thereof.

The regular compound of five tetrahedra comes in two enantiomorphic versions, which together make up the regular compound of ten tetrahedra. The regular compound of ten tetrahedra can also be seen as a compound of five stellae octangulae.

Each of the regular tetrahedral compounds is self-dual or dual to its chiral twin; the regular compound of five cubes and the regular compound of five octahedra are dual to each other.

Hence, regular polyhedral compounds can also be regarded as dual-regular compounds.

Coxeter's notation for regular compounds is given in the table above, incorporating Schläfli symbols. The material inside the square brackets, [d{p,q}], denotes the components of the compound: d separate {p,q}'s. The material before the square brackets denotes the vertex arrangement of the compound: c{m,n}[d{p,q}] is a compound of d {p,q}'s sharing the vertices of {m,n} counted c times. The material after the square brackets denotes the facet arrangement of the compound: [d{p,q}]e{s,t} is a compound of d {p,q}'s sharing the faces of {s,t} counted e times. These may be combined: thus c{m,n}[d{p,q}]e{s,t} is a compound of d {p,q}'s sharing the vertices of {m,n} counted c times and the faces of {s,t} counted e times. This notation can be generalised to compounds in any number of dimensions.

== Dual compounds ==
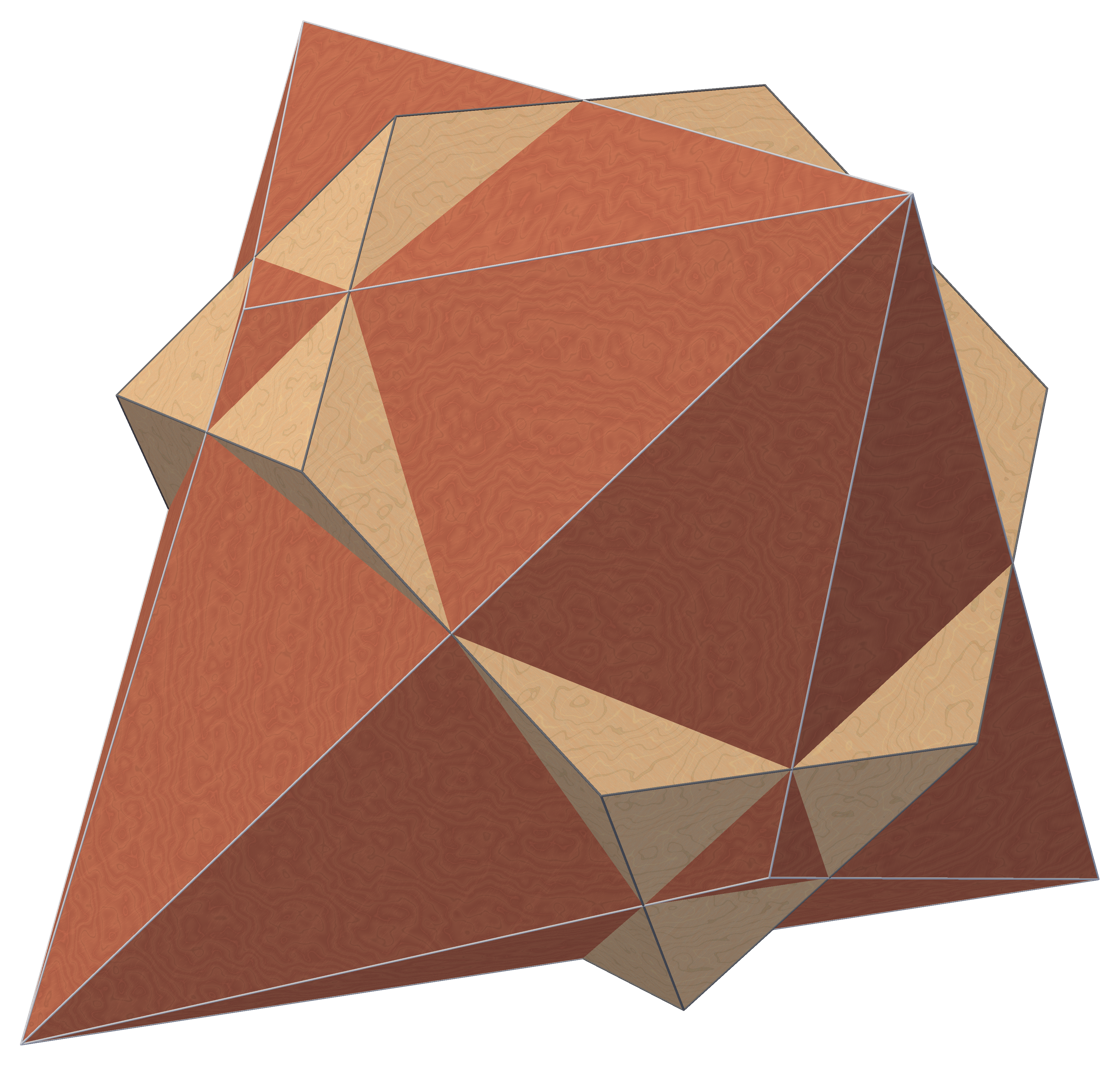
Truncated tetrahedron (light) and triakis tetrahedron (dark)

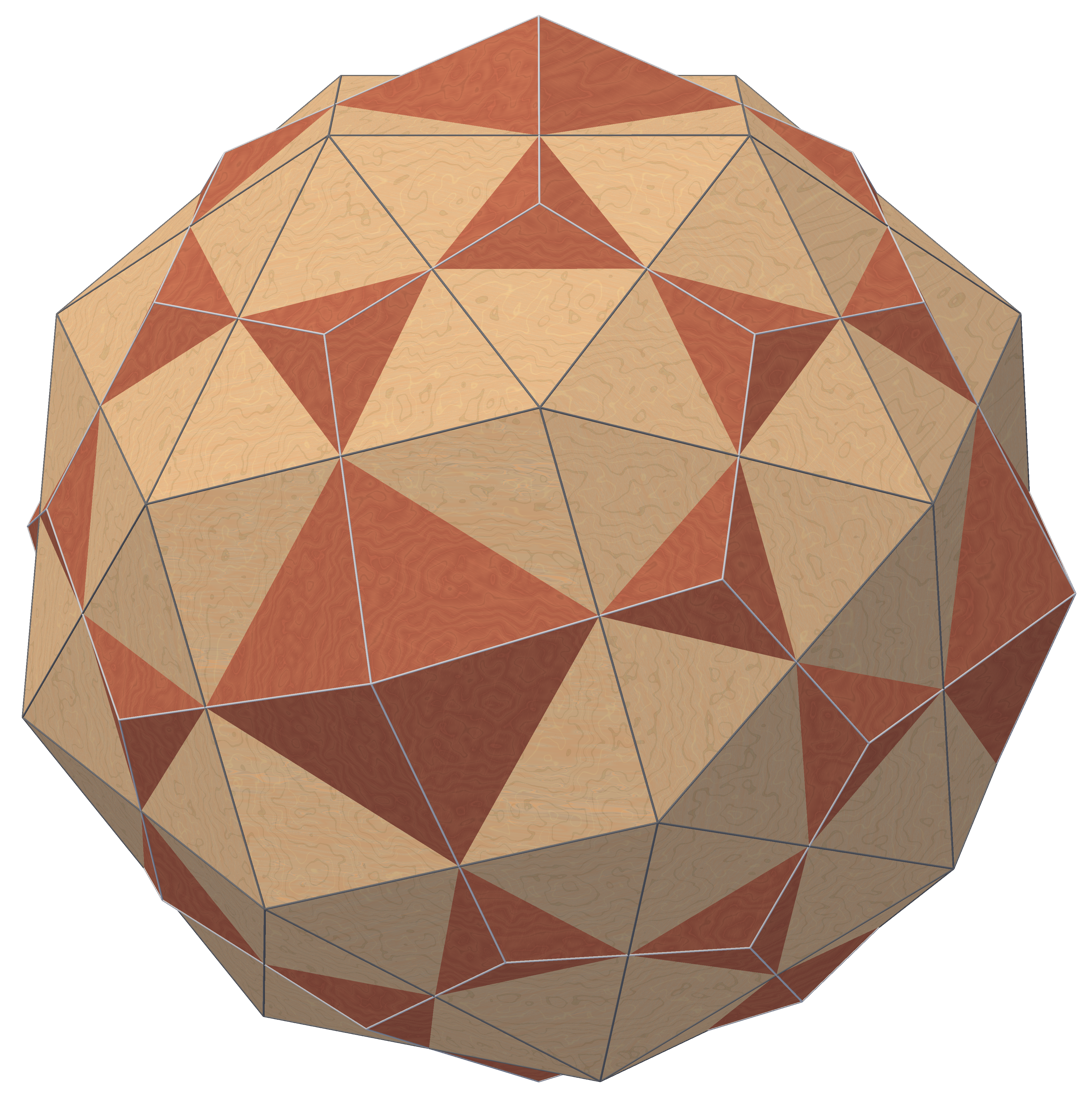
Snub cube (light) and pentagonal icositetrahedron (dark)

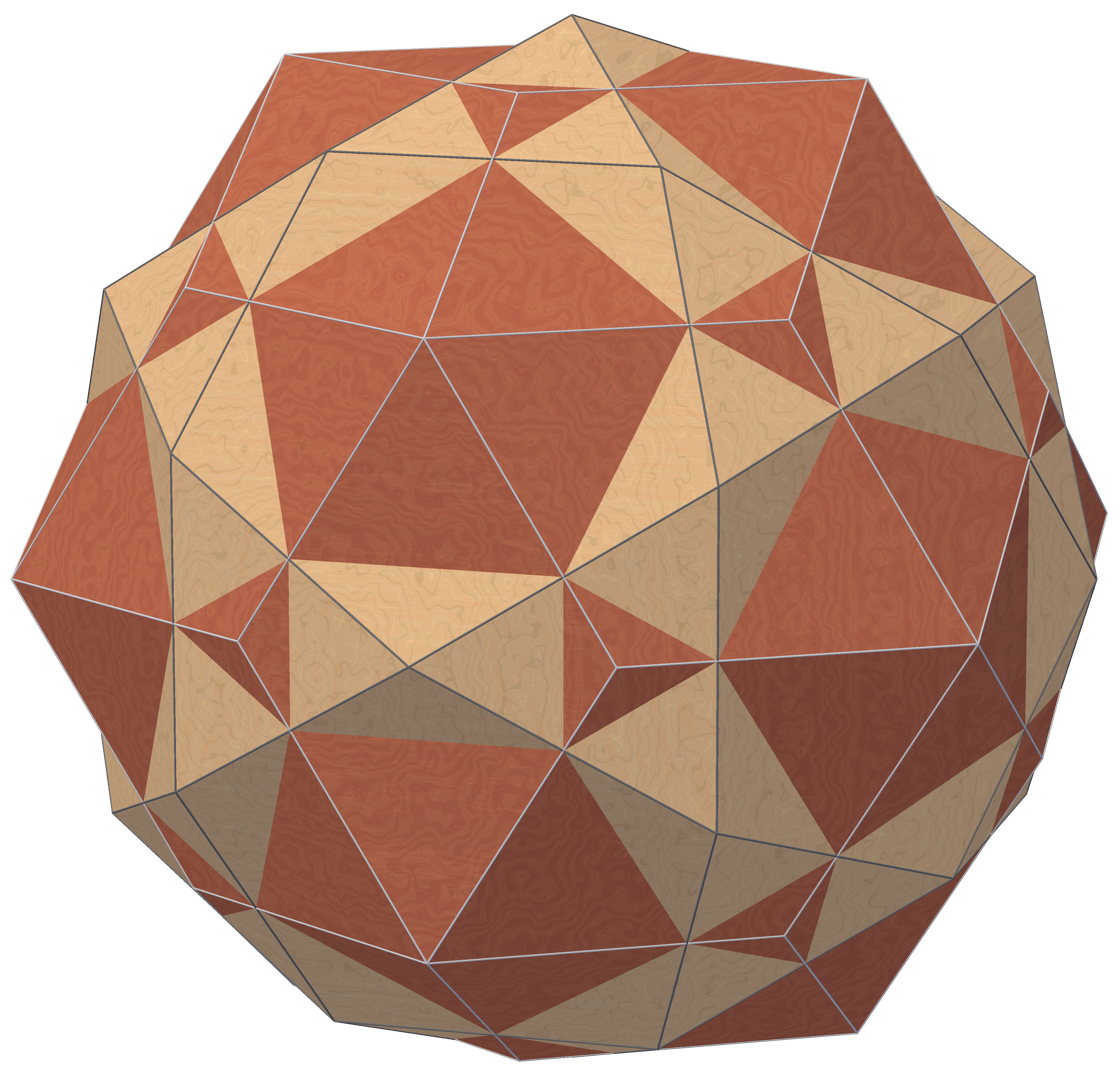
Icosidodecahedron (light) and rhombic triacontahedron (dark)

Dual compounds of Archimedean and Catalan solids

A dual compound is composed of a polyhedron and its dual, arranged reciprocally about a common midsphere, such that the edge of one polyhedron intersects the dual edge of the dual polyhedron. There are five dual compounds of the regular polyhedra.

The core is the rectification of both solids. The hull is the dual of this rectification, and its rhombic faces have the intersecting edges of the two solids as diagonals (and have their four alternate vertices). For the convex solids, this is the convex hull.

Dual compound	Picture	Hull	Core	Symmetry group
Two tetrahedra (Compound of two tetrahedra, stellated octahedron)		Cube	Octahedron	*432 [4,3] O_{h}
Cube and octahedron (Compound of cube and octahedron)		Rhombic dodecahedron	Cuboctahedron	*432 [4,3] O_{h}
Dodecahedron and icosahedron (Compound of dodecahedron and icosahedron)		Rhombic triacontahedron	Icosidodecahedron	*532 [5,3] I_{h}
Small stellated dodecahedron and great dodecahedron (Compound of sD and gD)		Medial rhombic triacontahedron (Convex: Icosahedron)	Dodecadodecahedron (Convex: Dodecahedron)	*532 [5,3] I_{h}
Great icosahedron and great stellated dodecahedron (Compound of gI and gsD)		Great rhombic triacontahedron (Convex: Dodecahedron)	Great icosidodecahedron (Convex: Icosadodecahedron)	*532 [5,3] I_{h}

The tetrahedron is self-dual, so the dual compound of a tetrahedron with its dual is the regular stellated octahedron.

The octahedral and icosahedral dual compounds are the first stellations of the cuboctahedron and icosidodecahedron, respectively.

The small stellated dodecahedral (or great dodecahedral) dual compound has the great dodecahedron completely interior to the small stellated dodecahedron.

== Uniform compounds ==
In 1976 John Skilling published Uniform Compounds of Uniform Polyhedra which enumerated 75 compounds (including 6 as infinite prismatic sets of compounds, #20-#25) made from uniform polyhedra with rotational symmetry. (Every vertex is vertex-transitive and every vertex is transitive with every other vertex.) This list includes the five regular compounds above.

The 75 uniform compounds are listed in the Table below. Most are shown singularly colored by each polyhedron element. Some chiral pairs of face groups are colored by symmetry of the faces within each polyhedron.

- 1-19: Miscellaneous (4,5,6,9,17 are the 5 regular compounds)

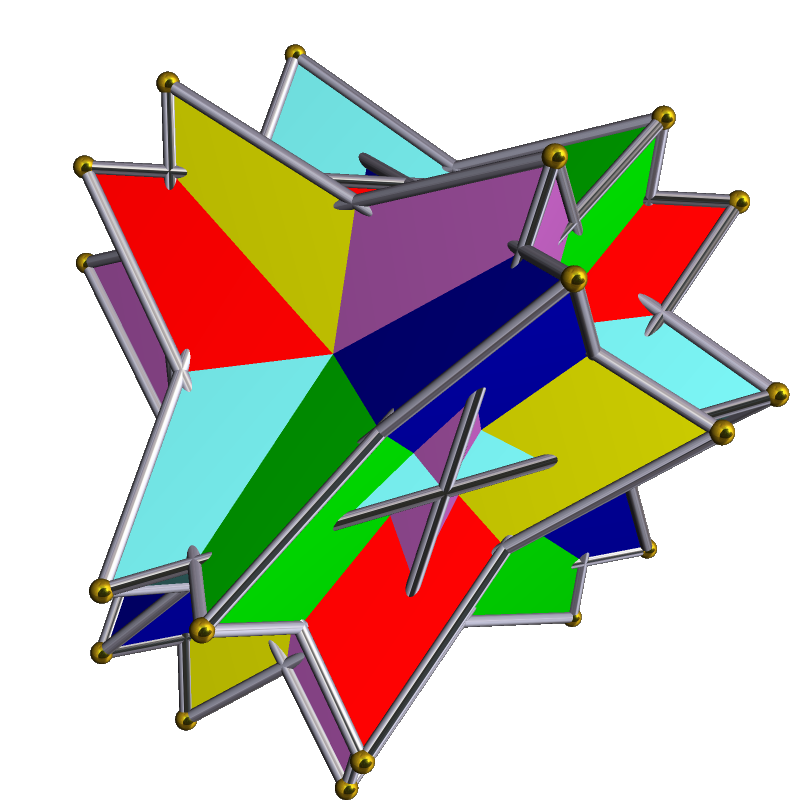

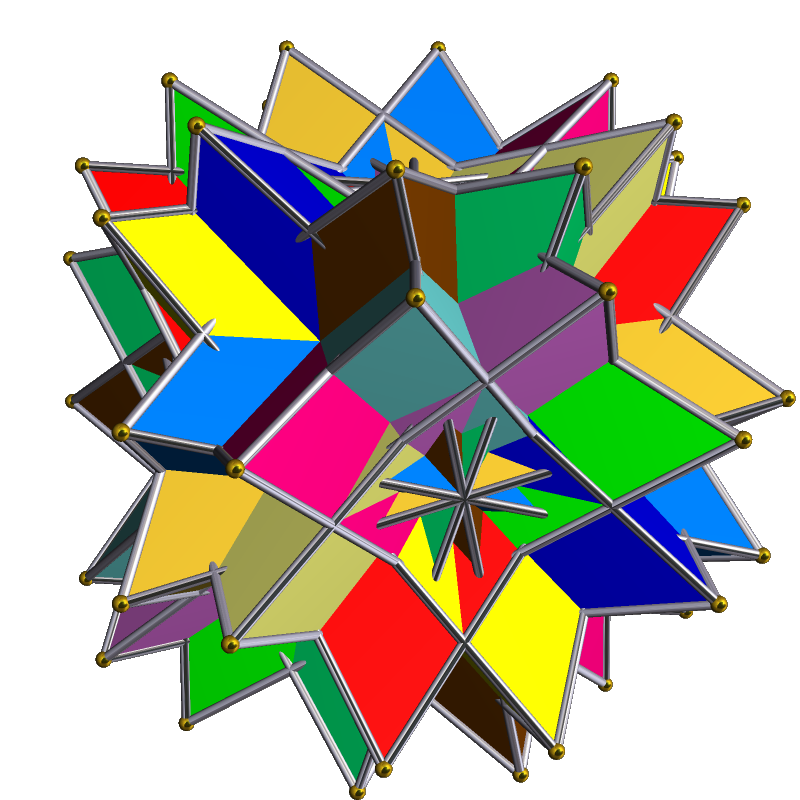

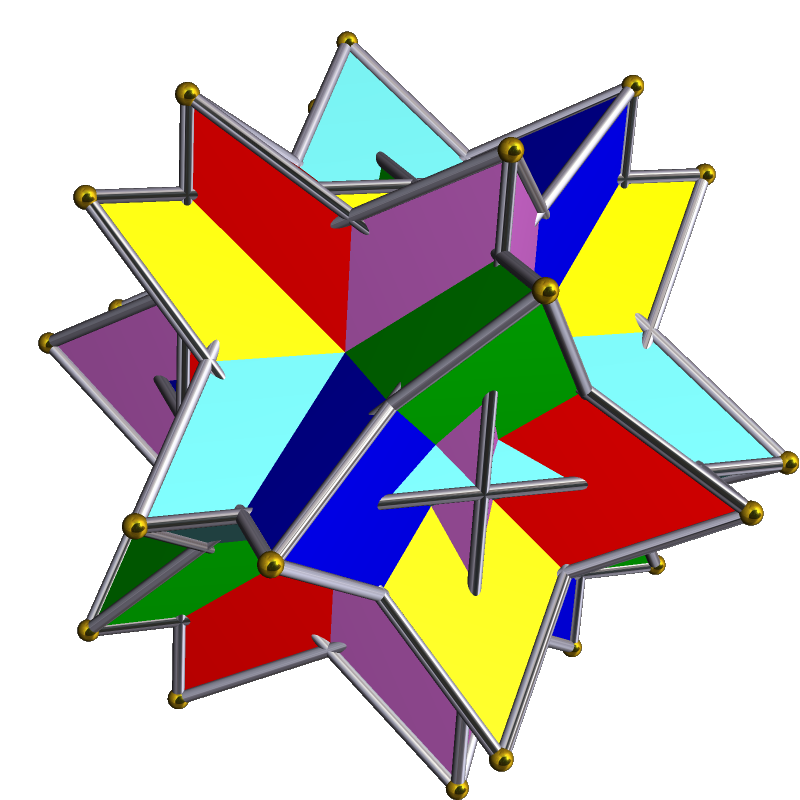

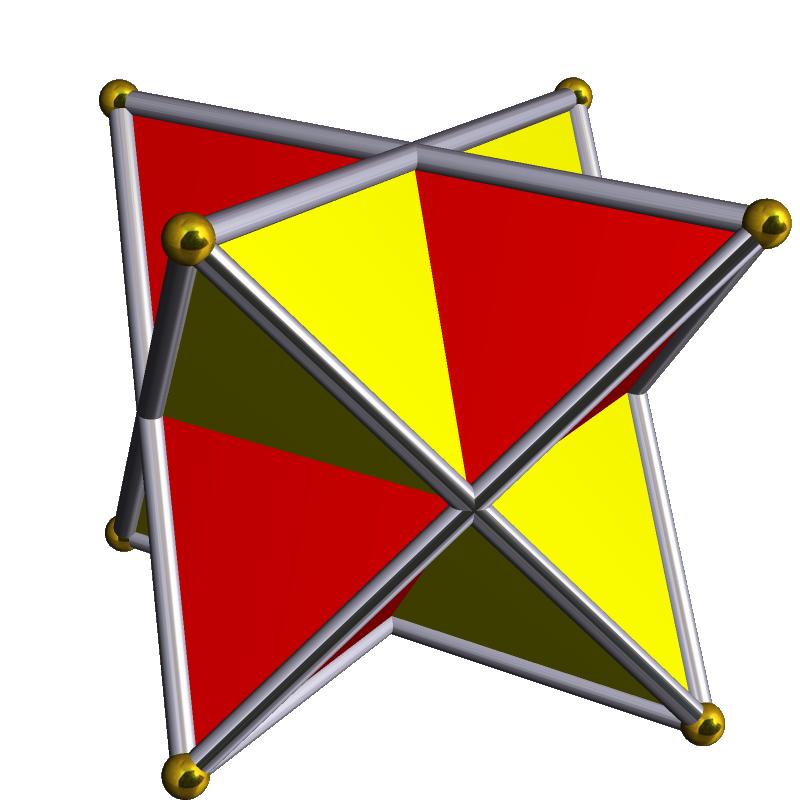

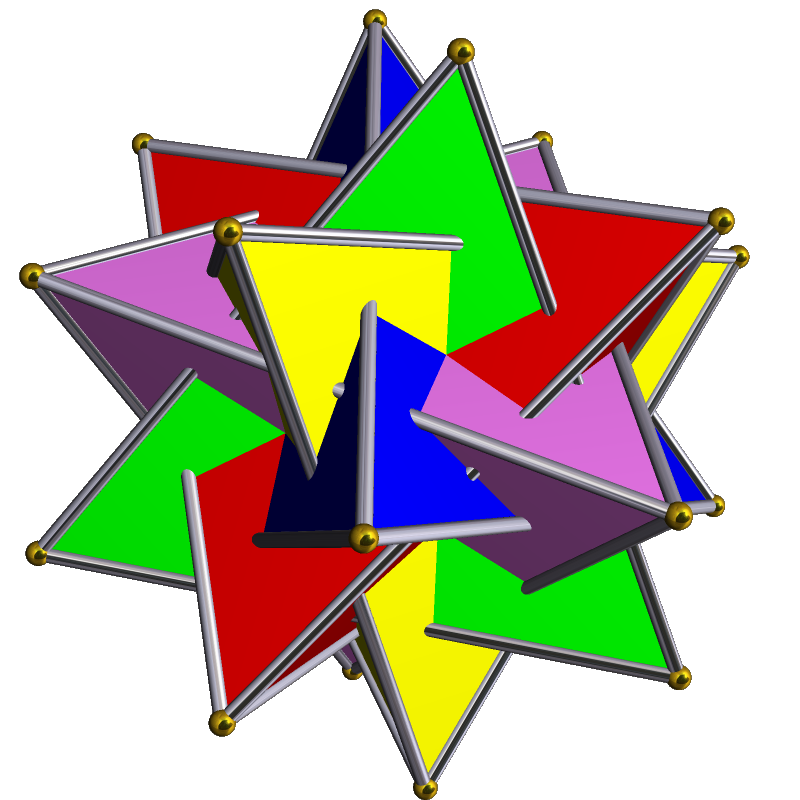

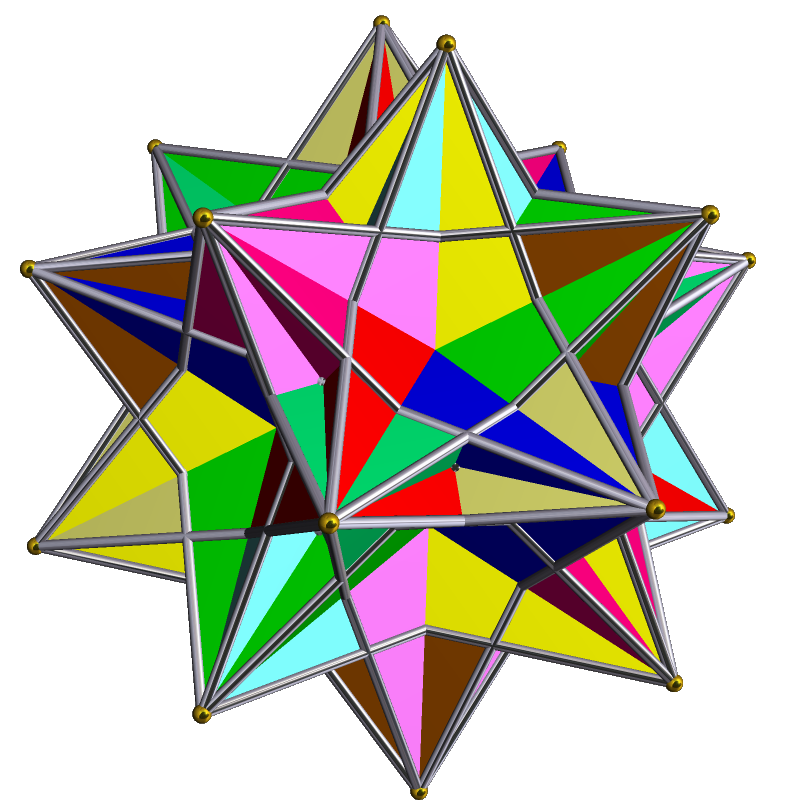

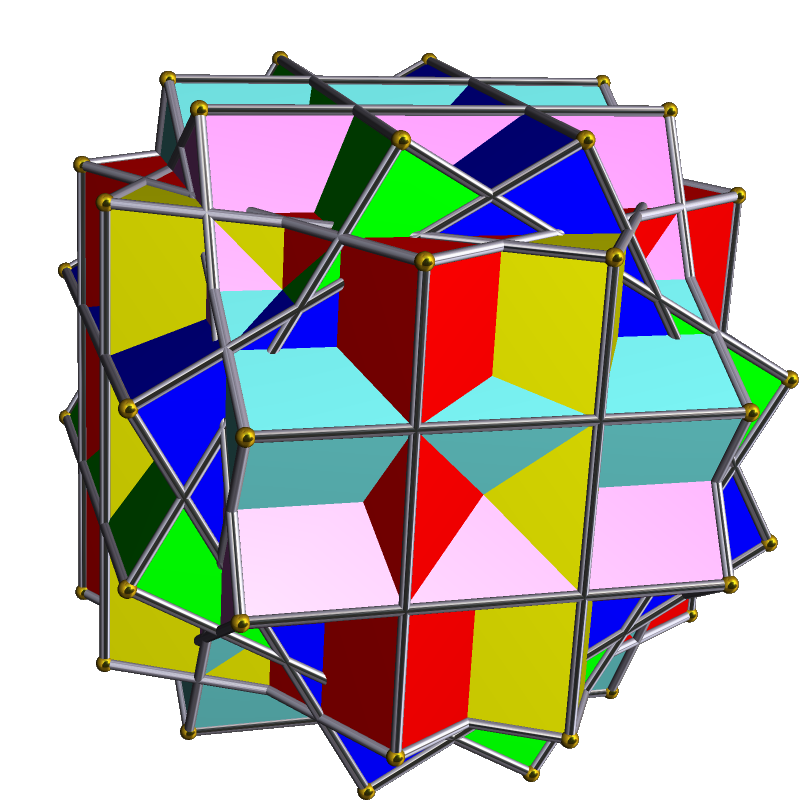

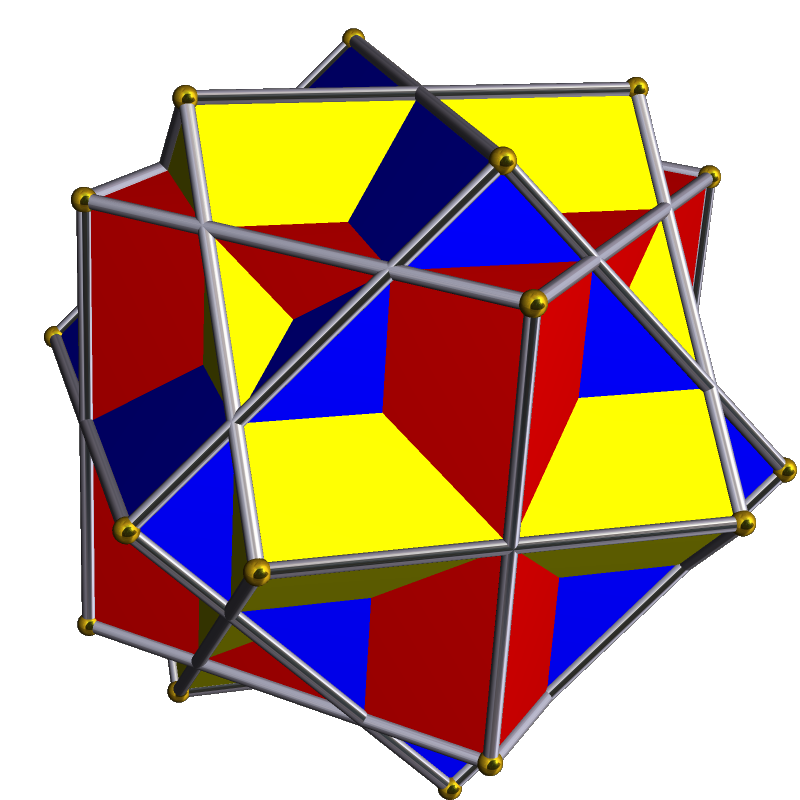

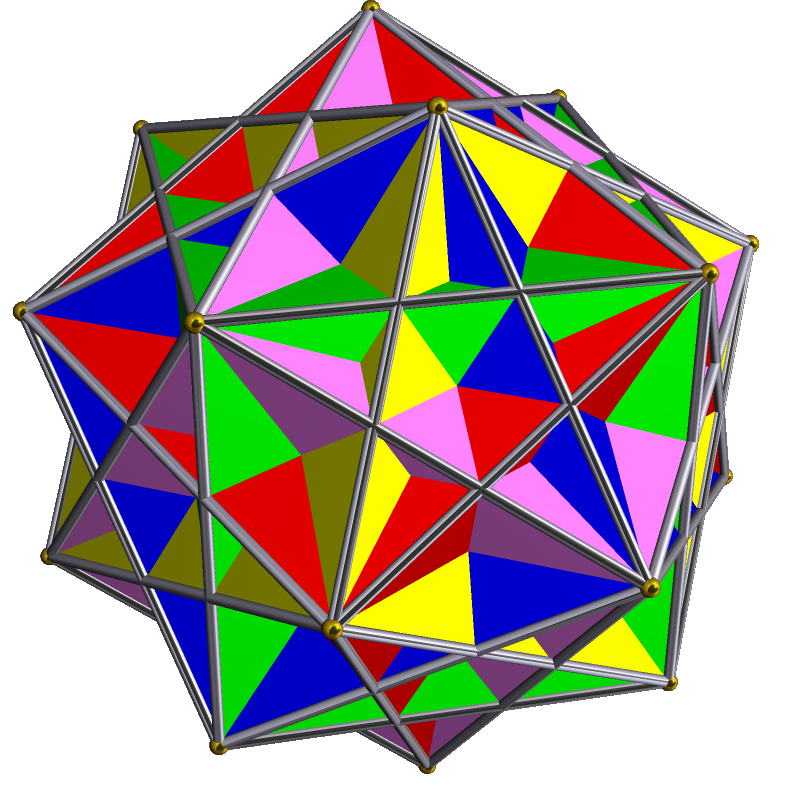

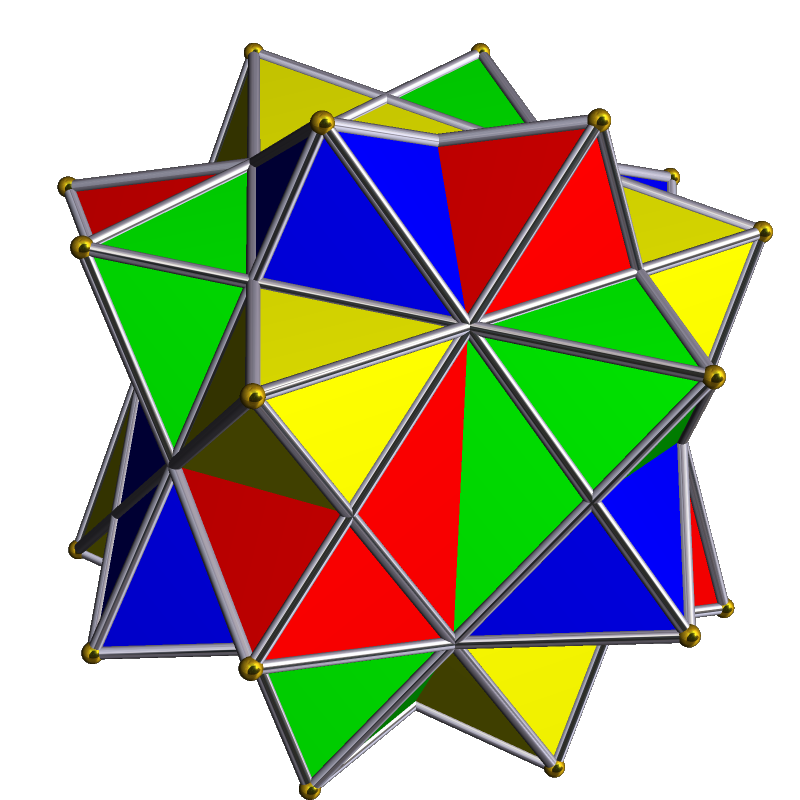

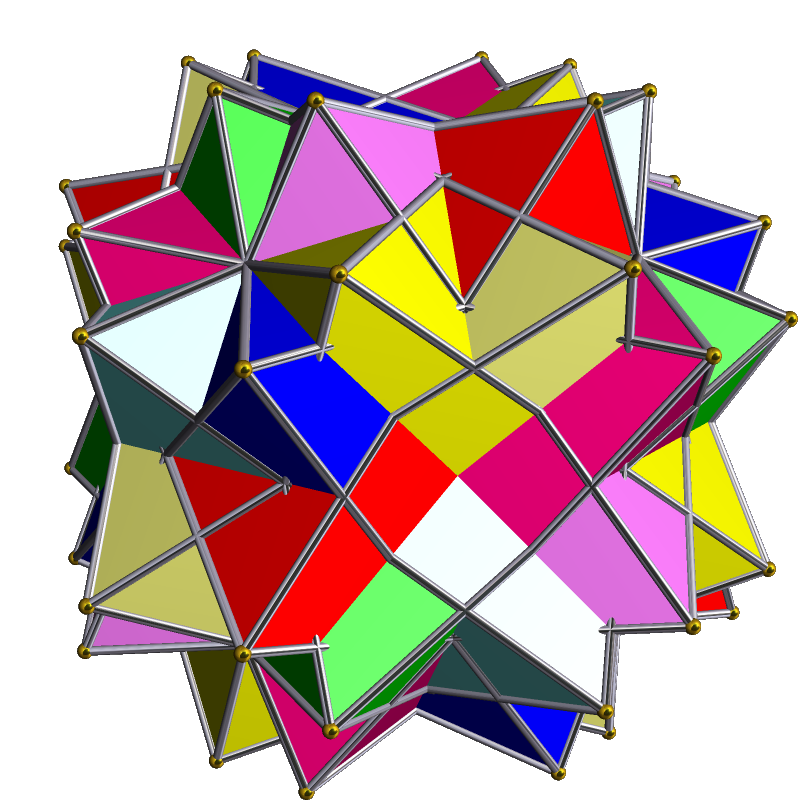

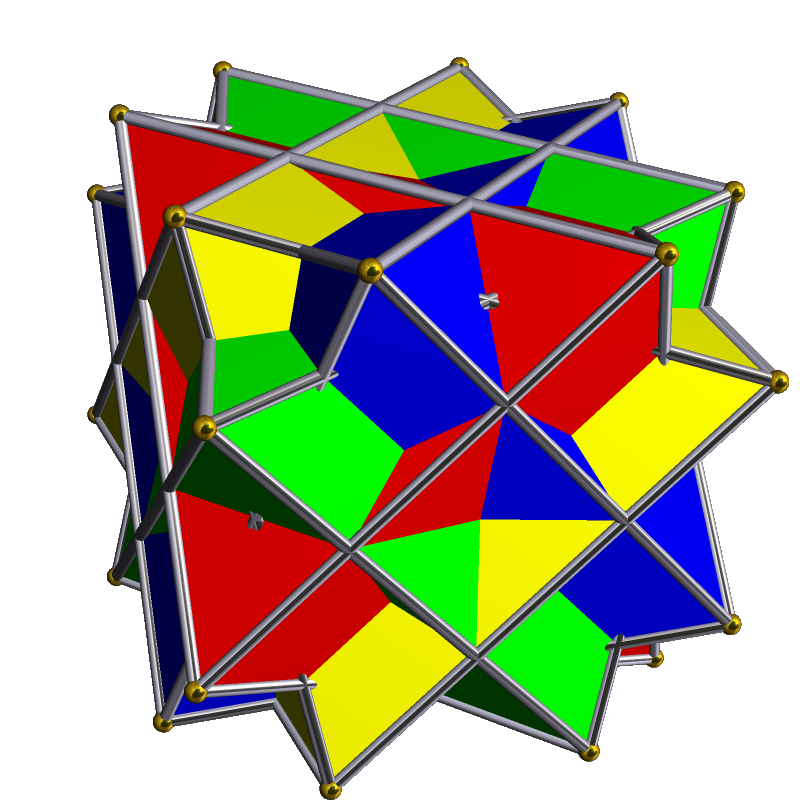

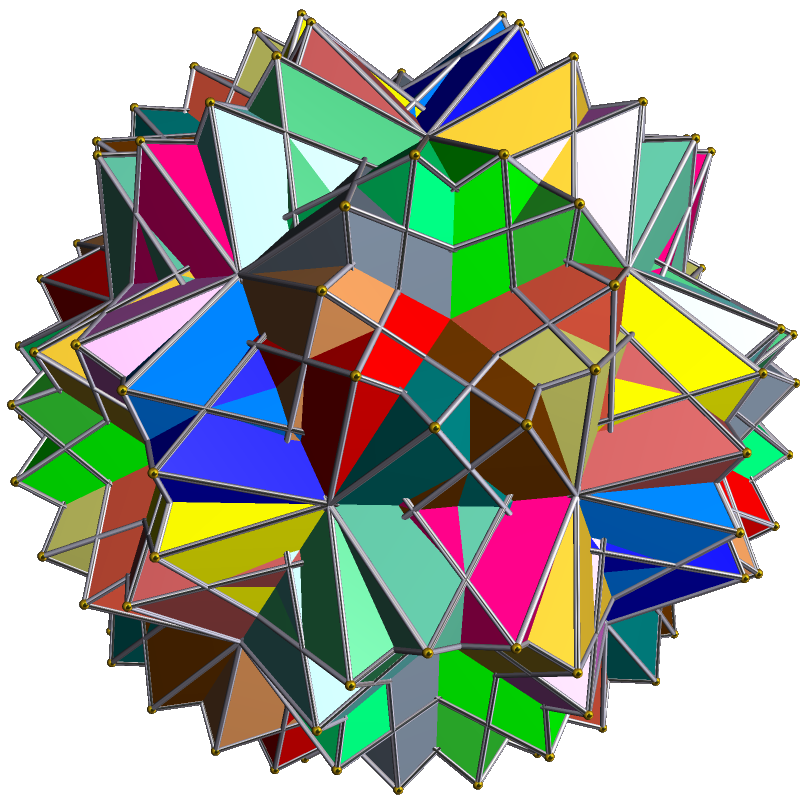

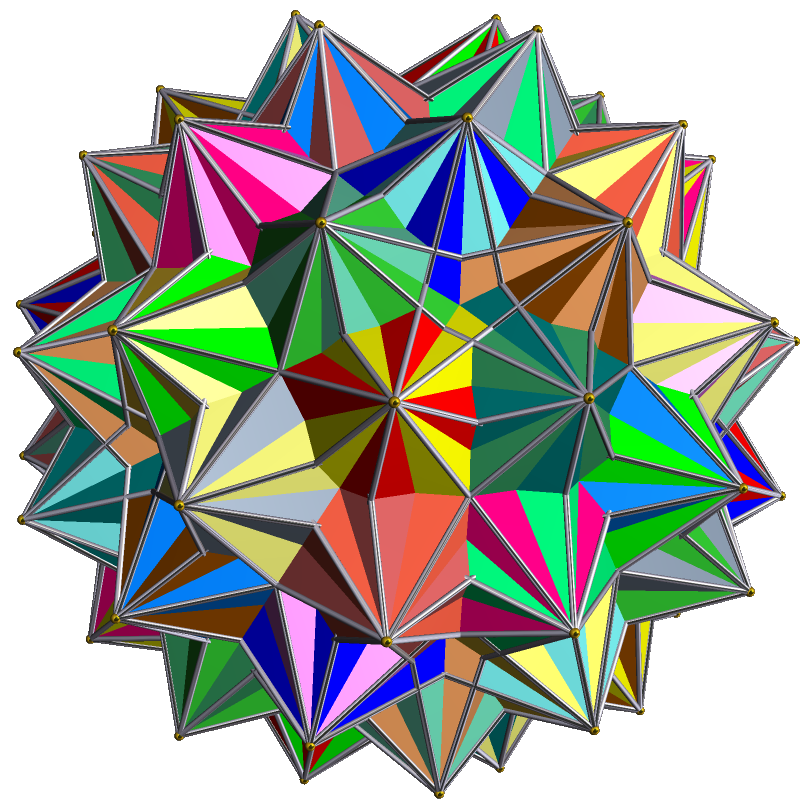

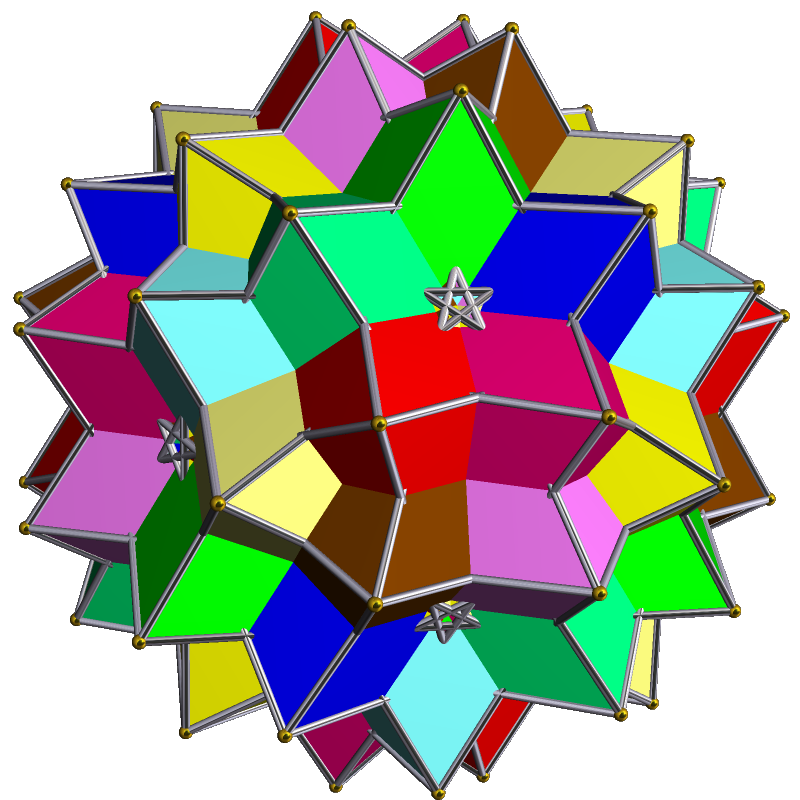

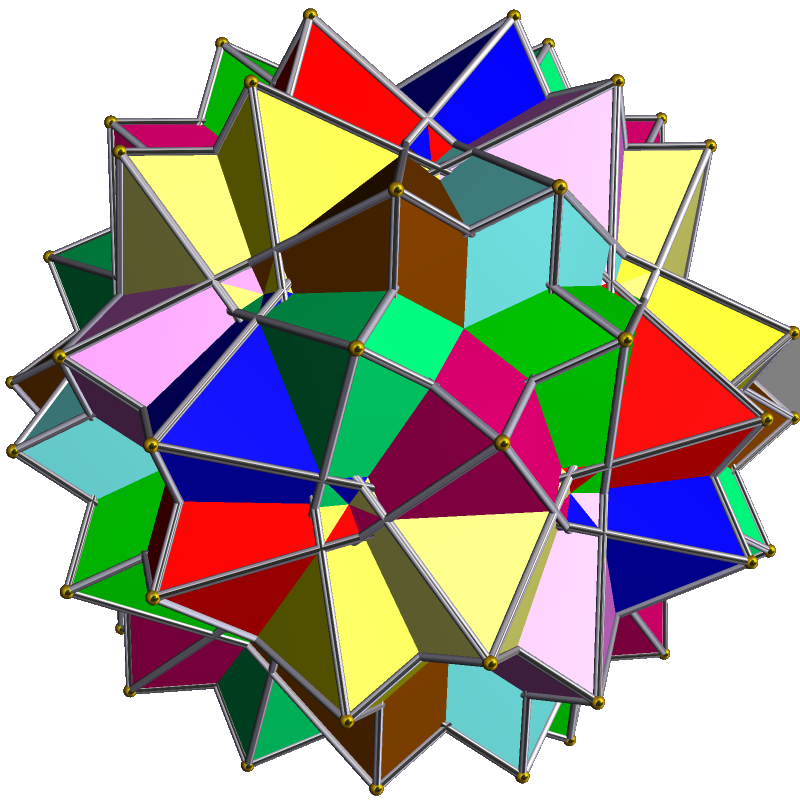

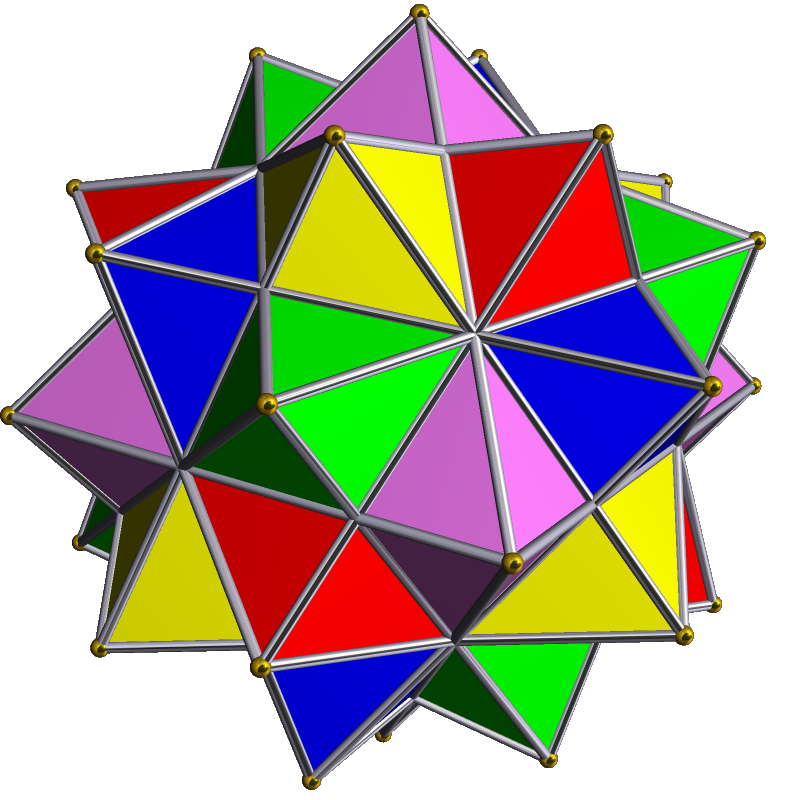

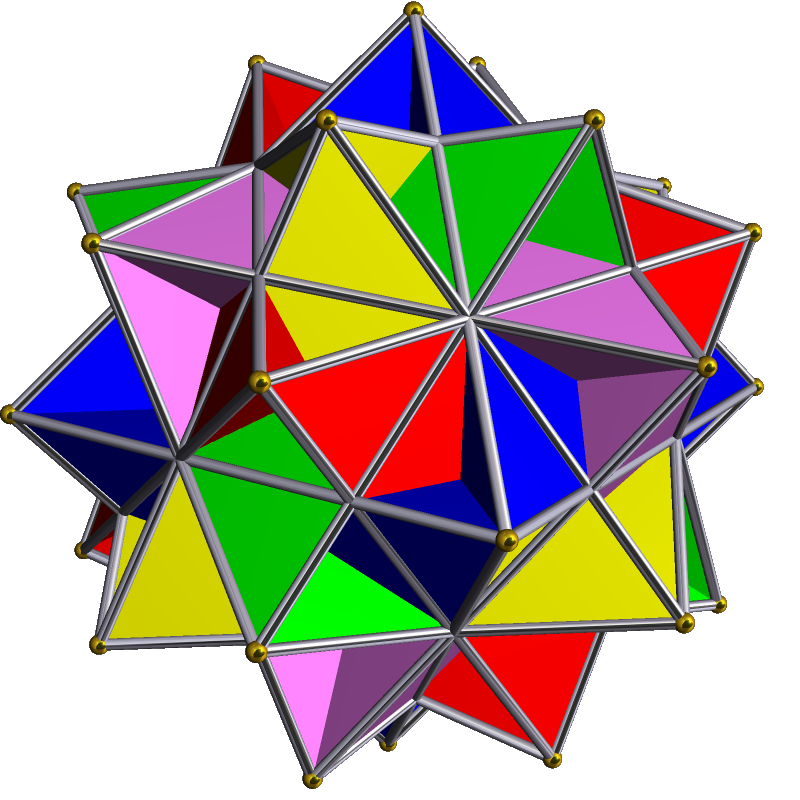

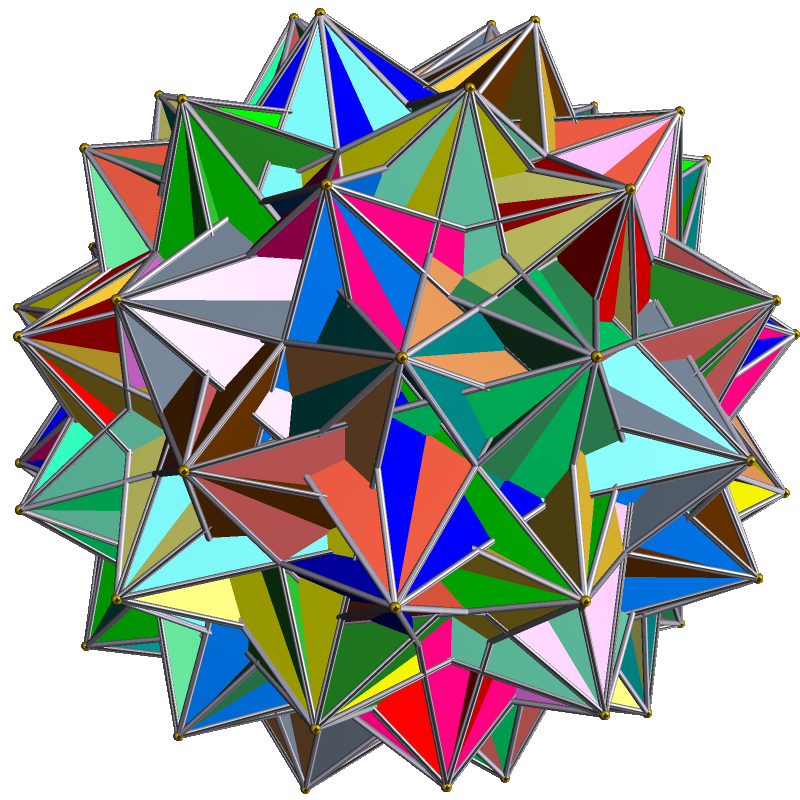

- 20-25: Prism symmetry embedded in prism symmetry,

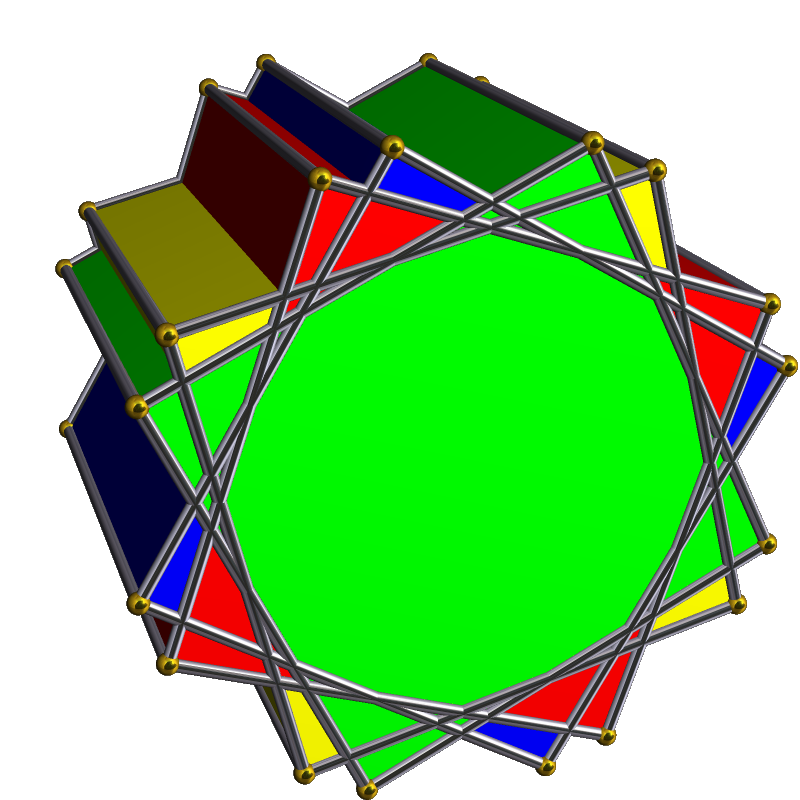

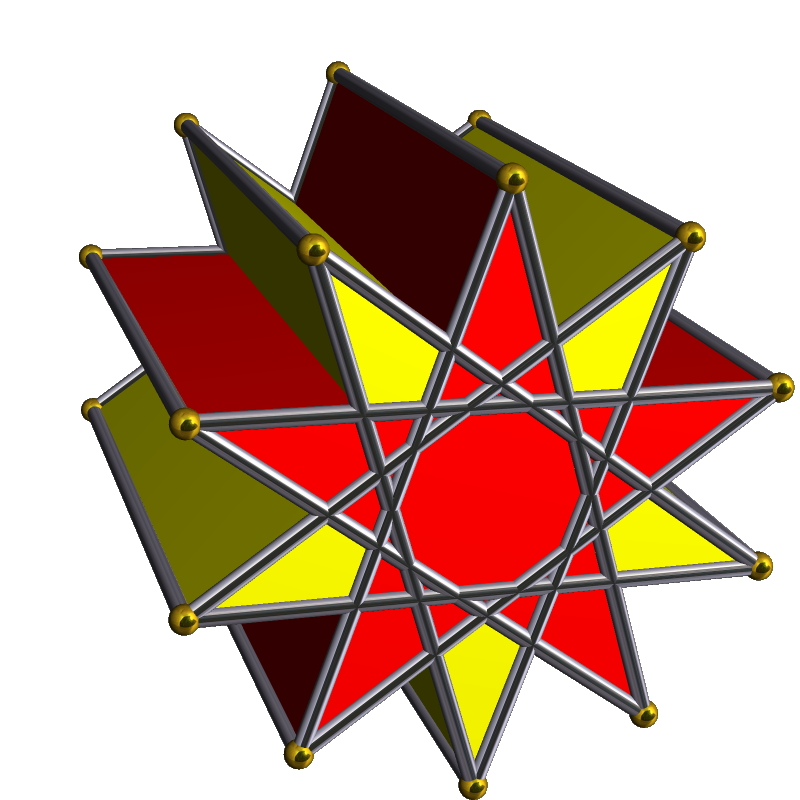

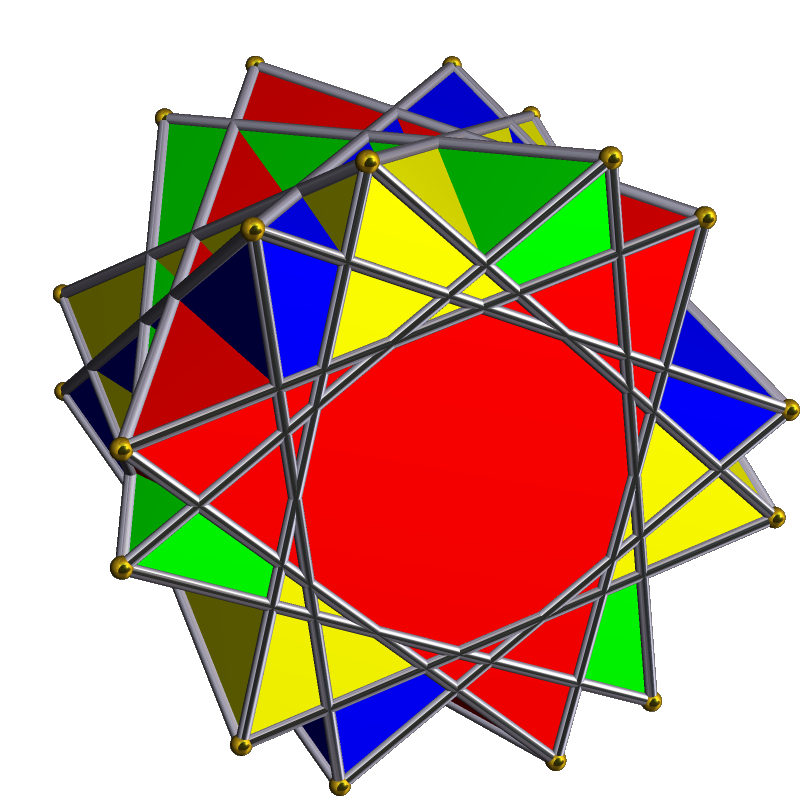

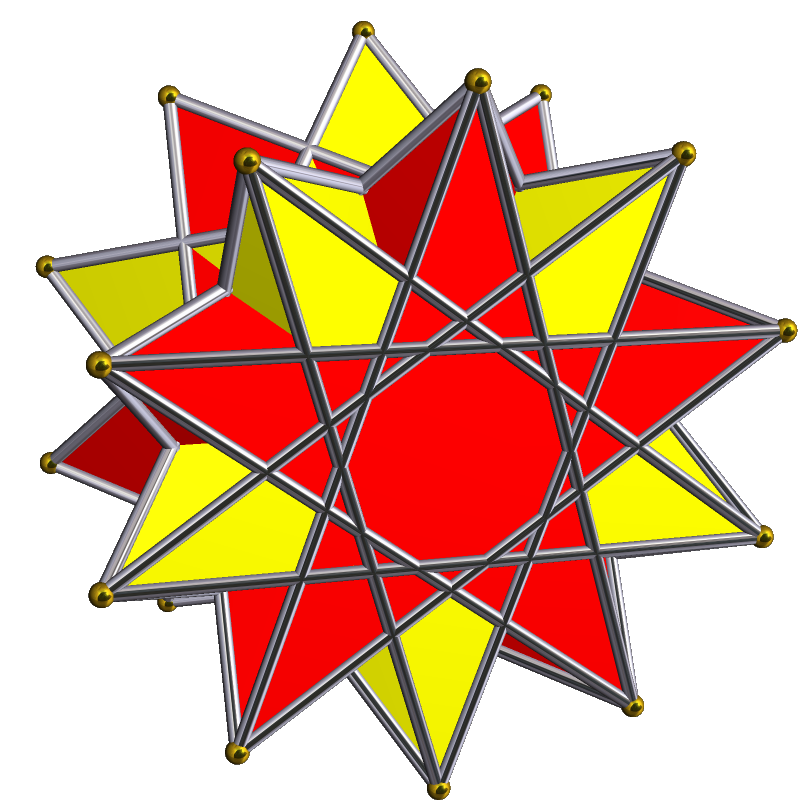

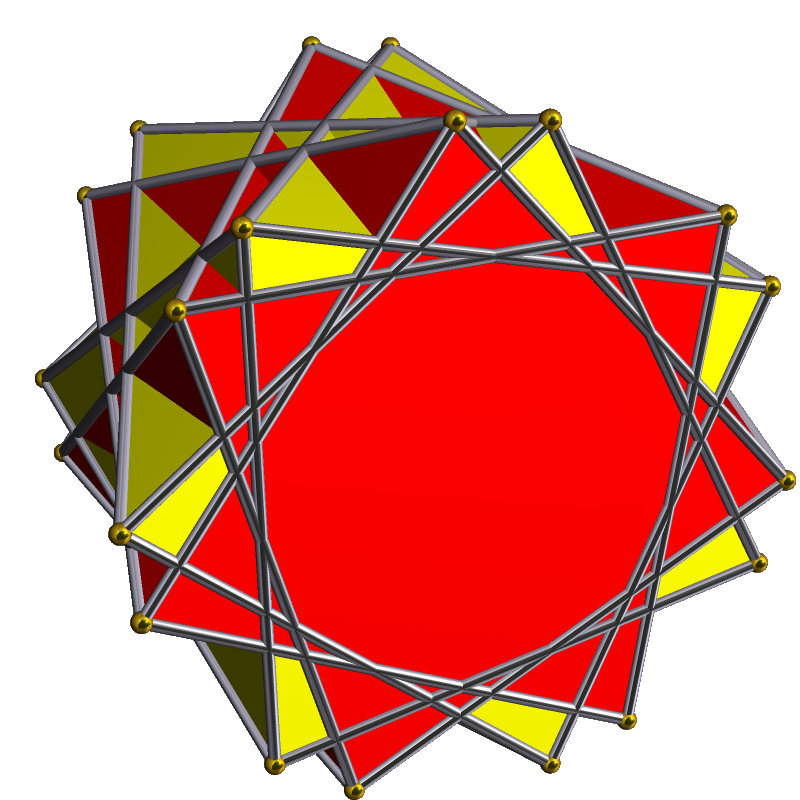

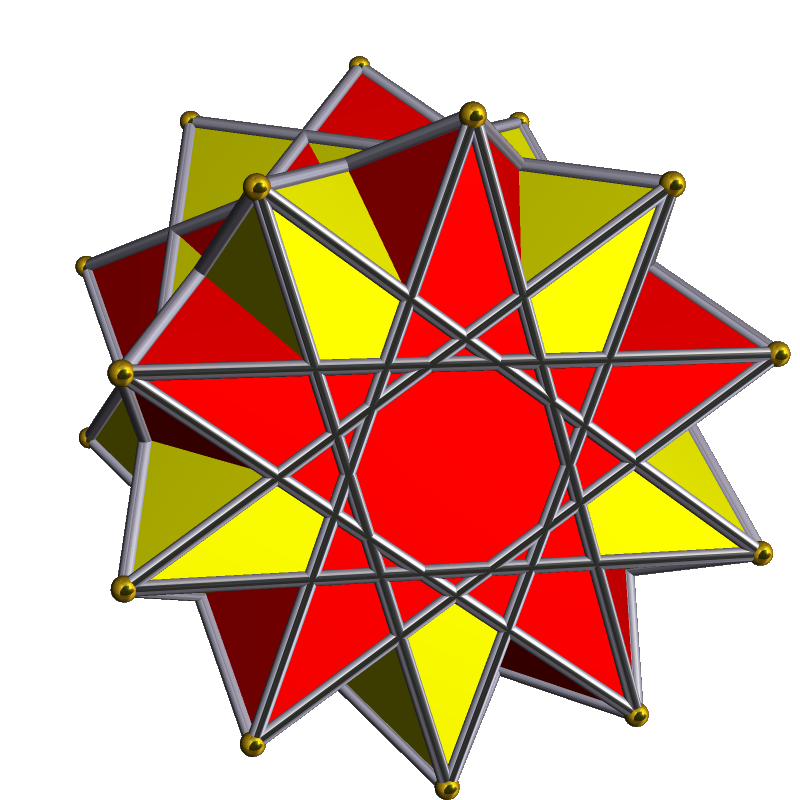

- 26-45: Prism symmetry embedded in octahedral or icosahedral symmetry,

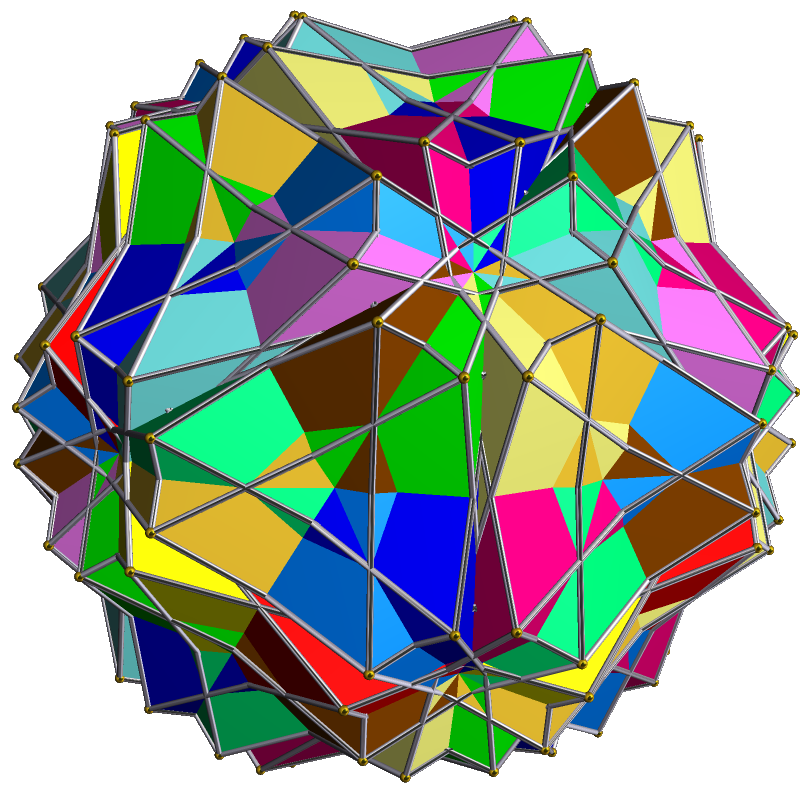

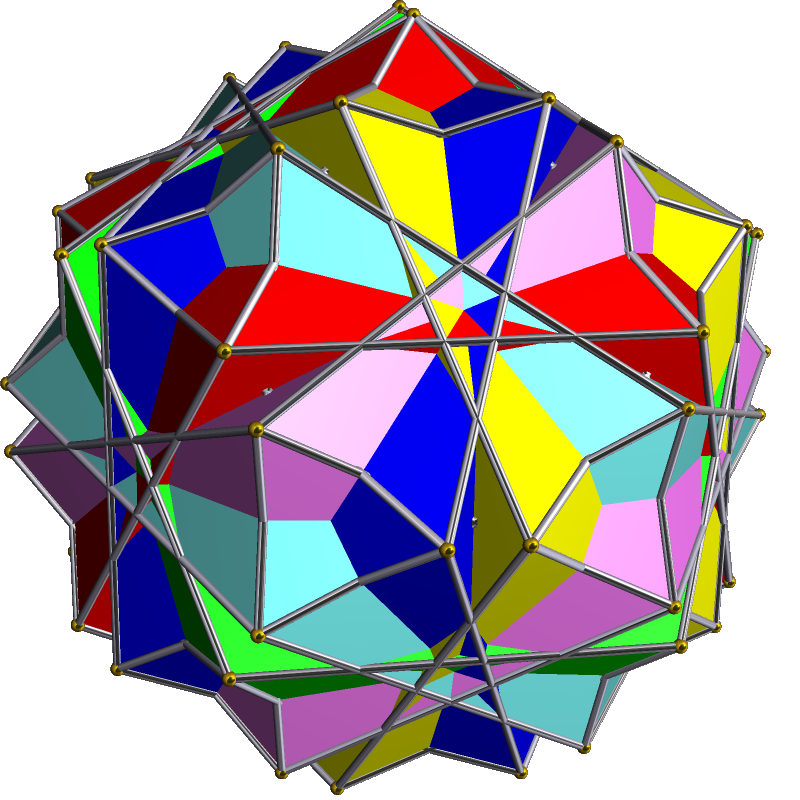

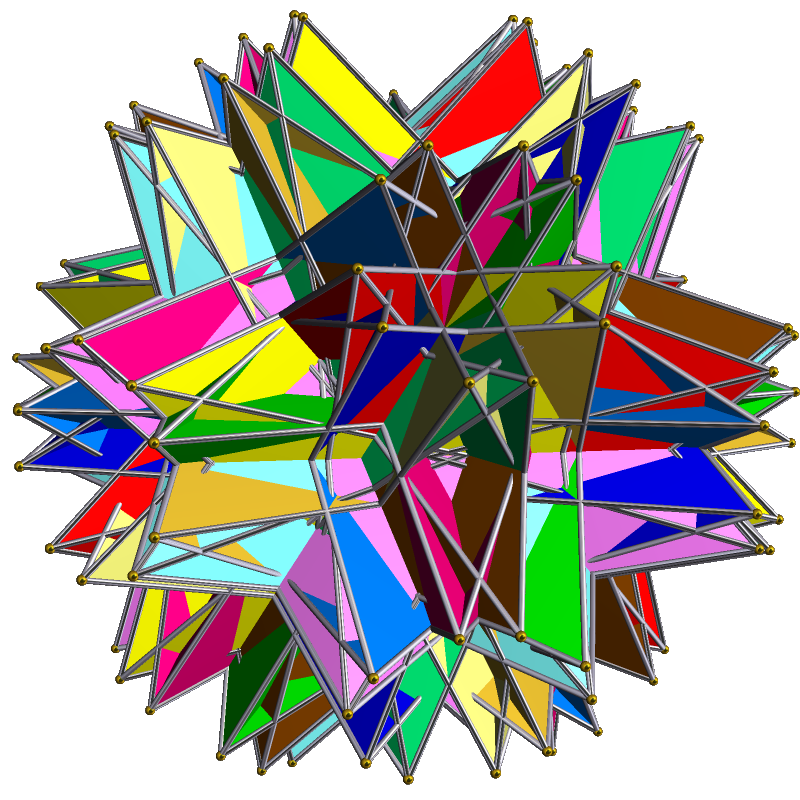

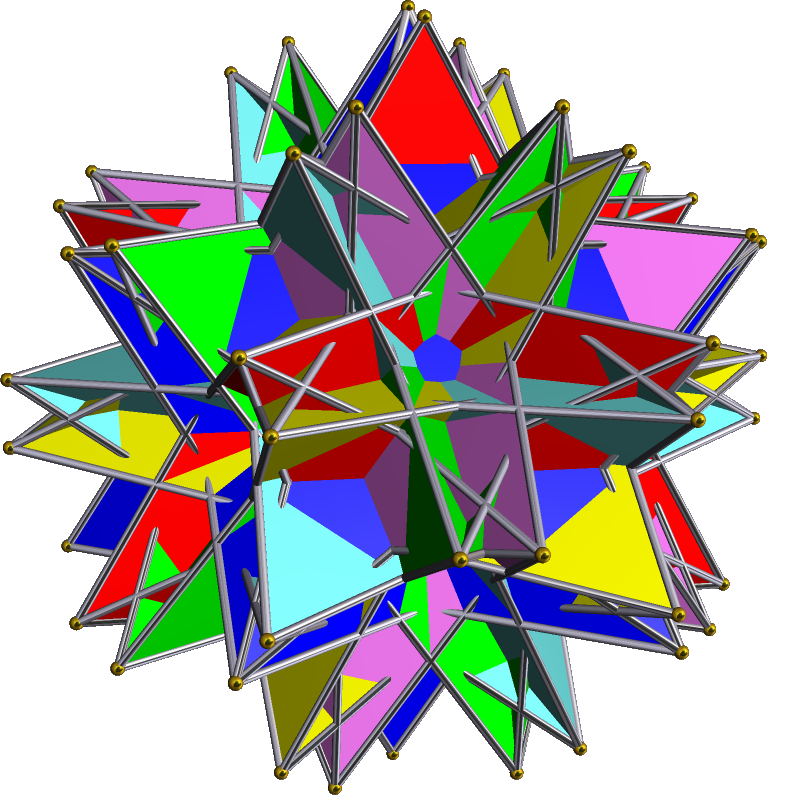

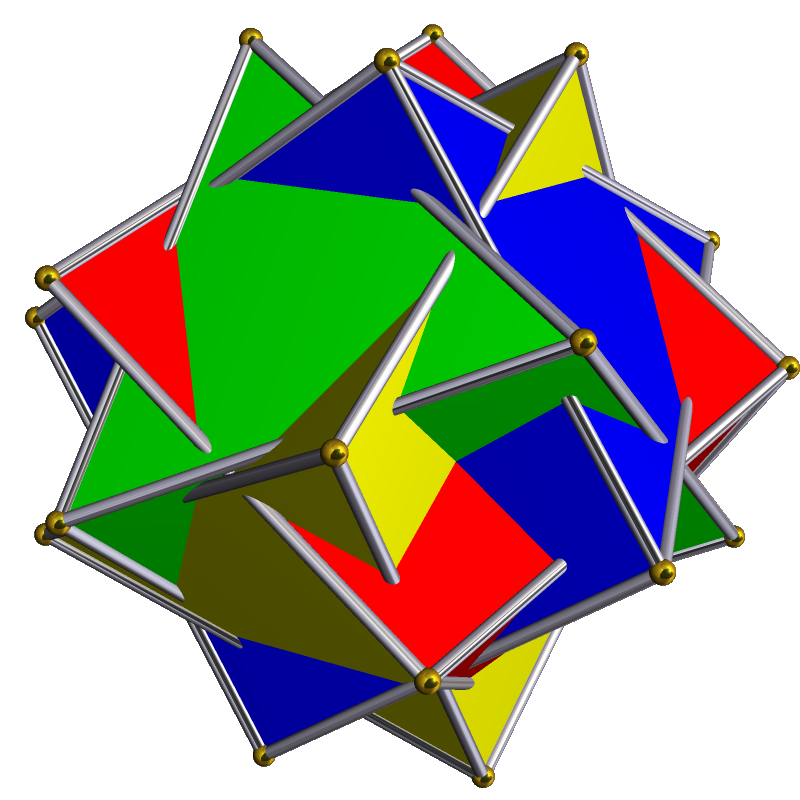

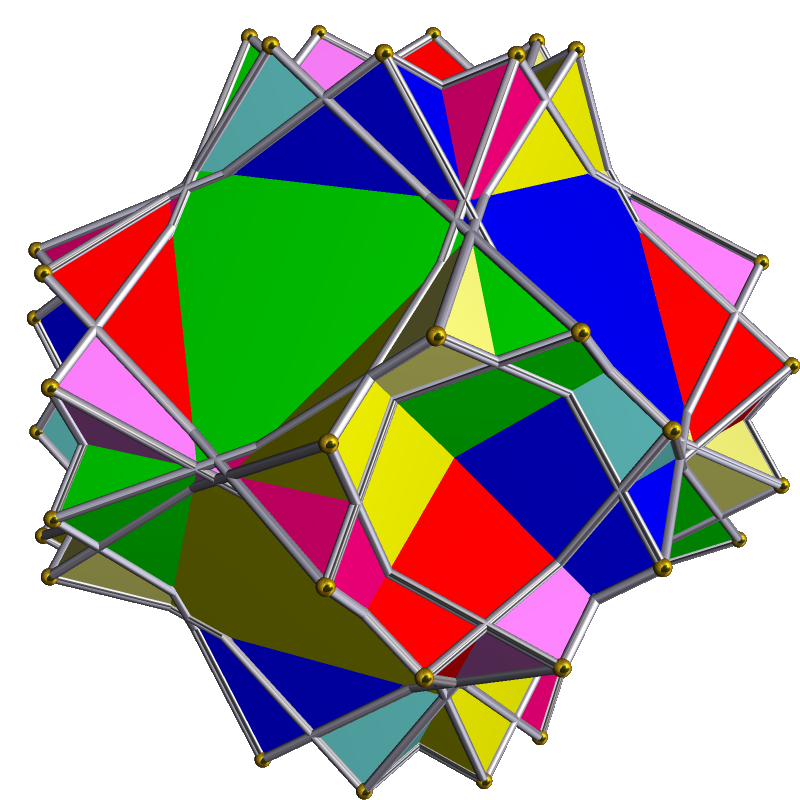

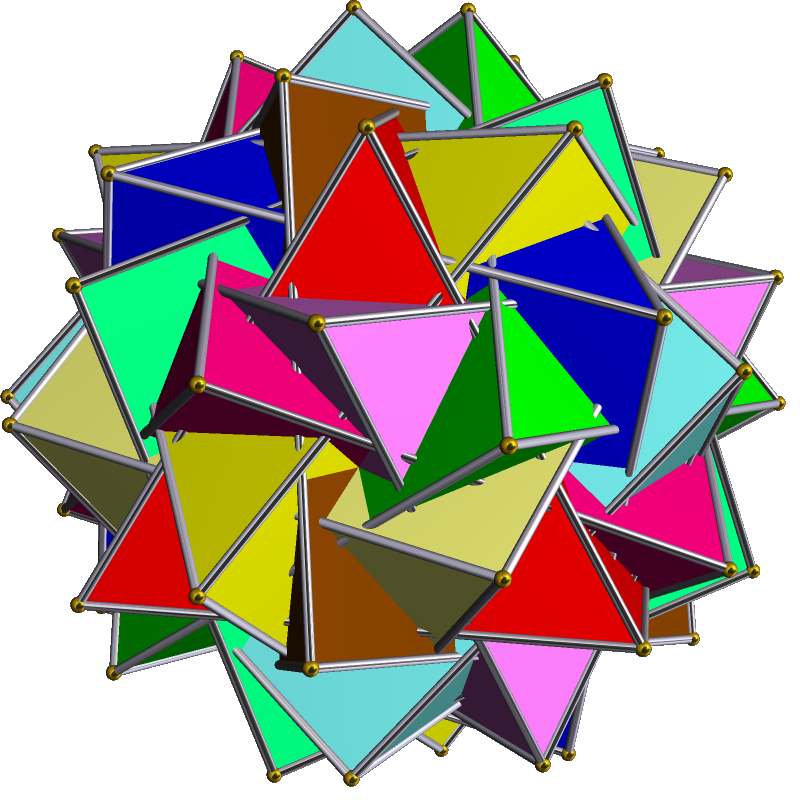

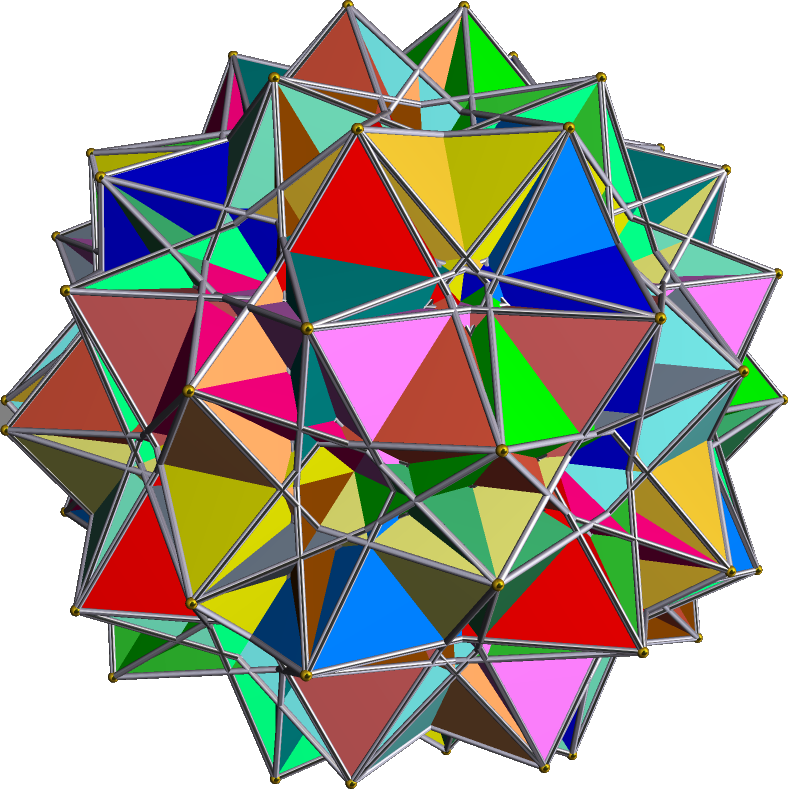

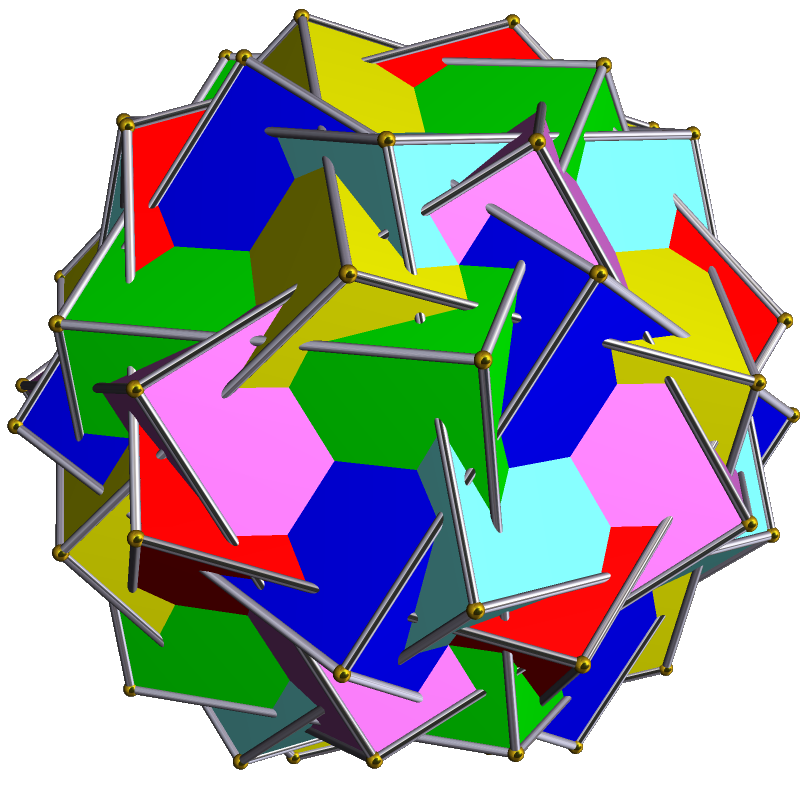

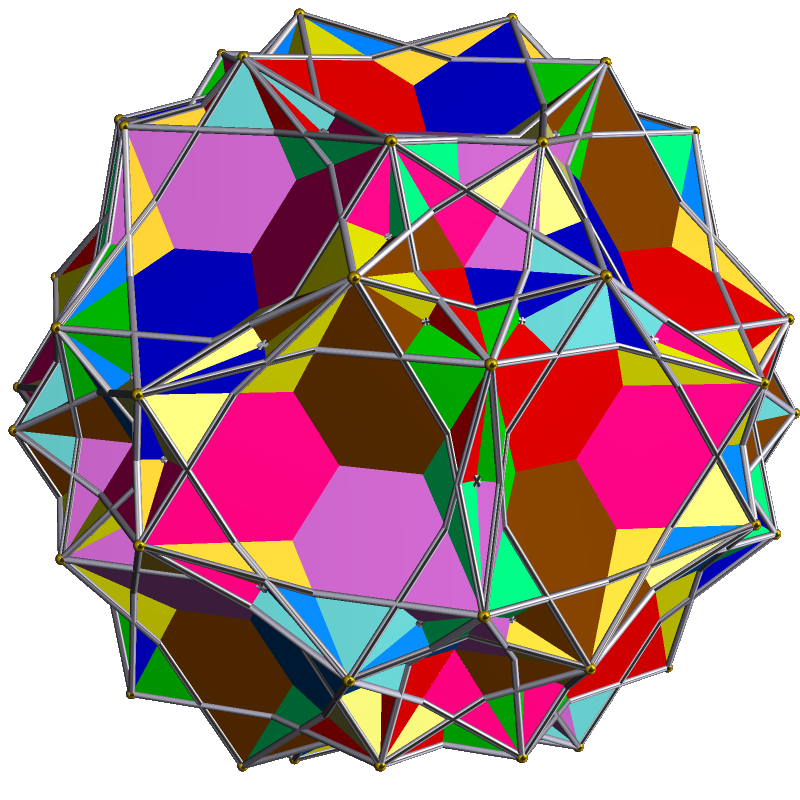

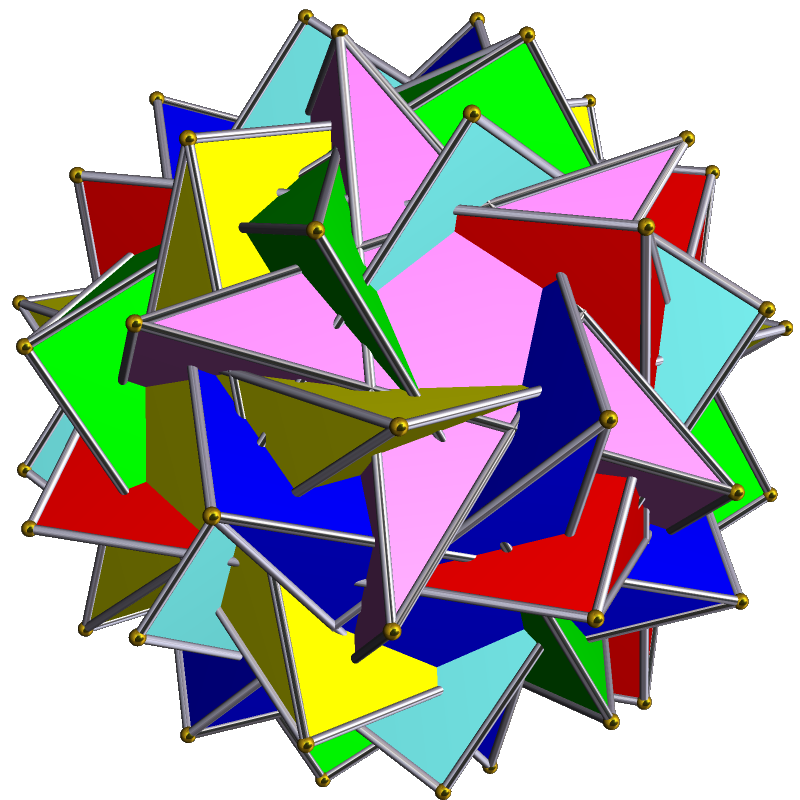

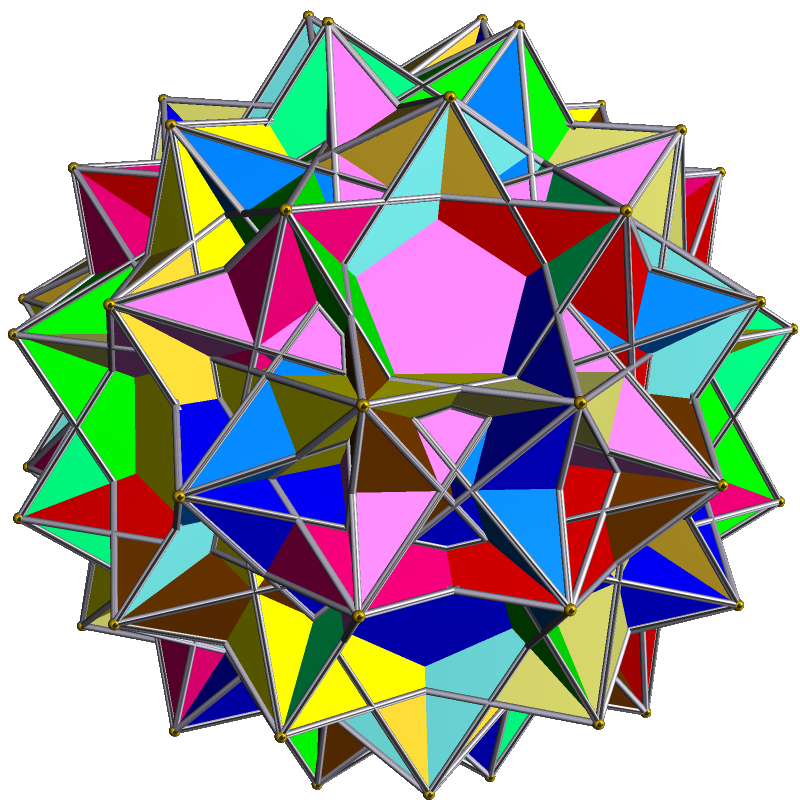

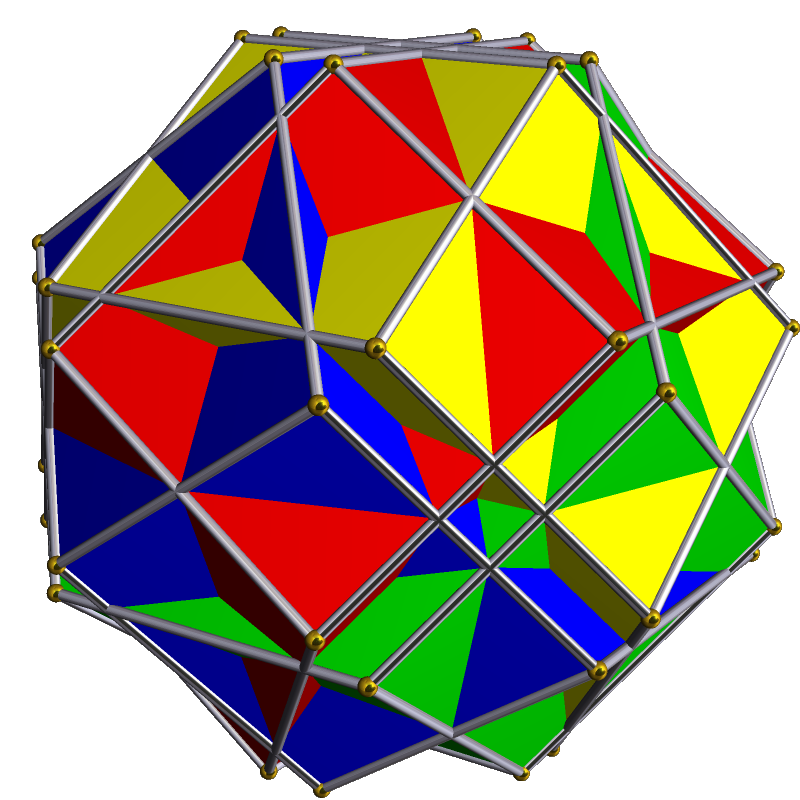

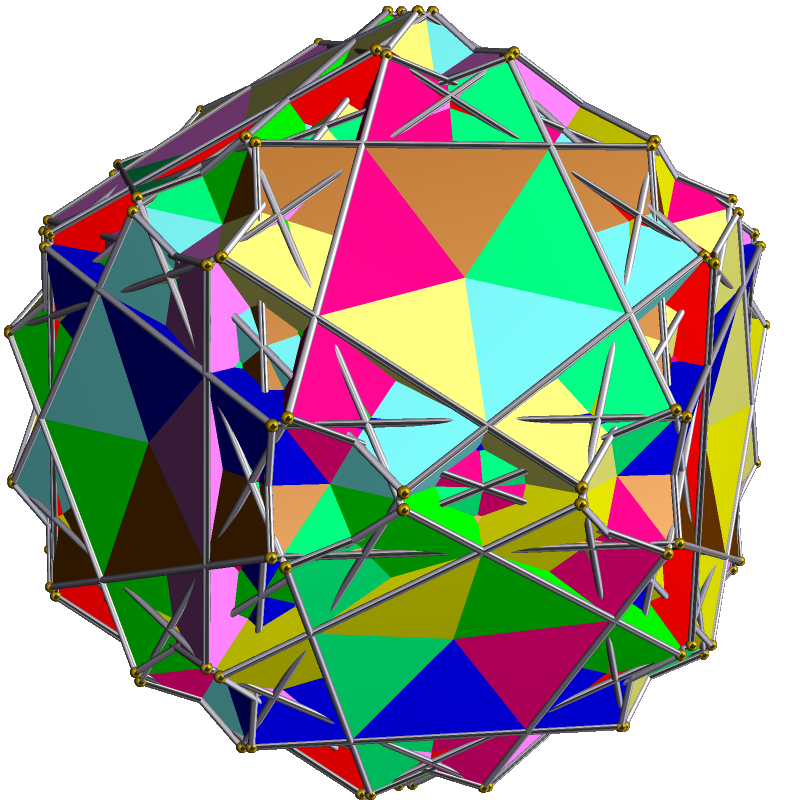

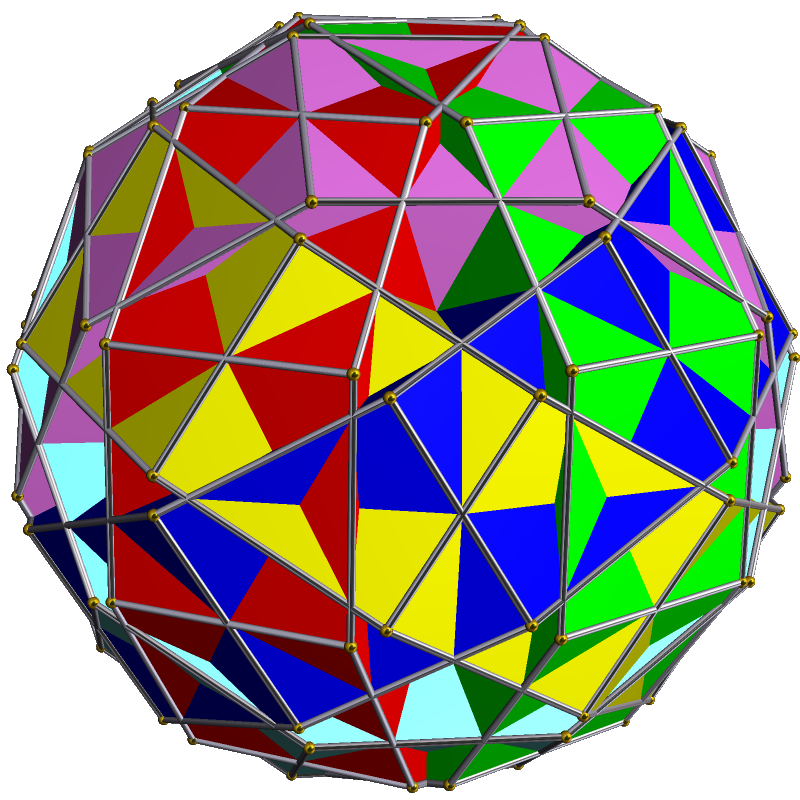

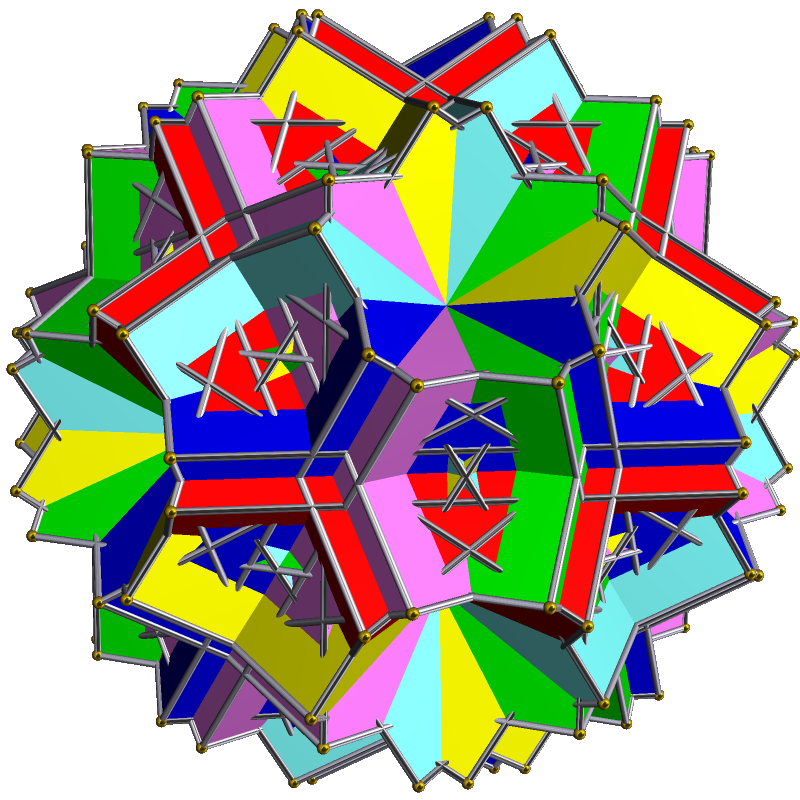

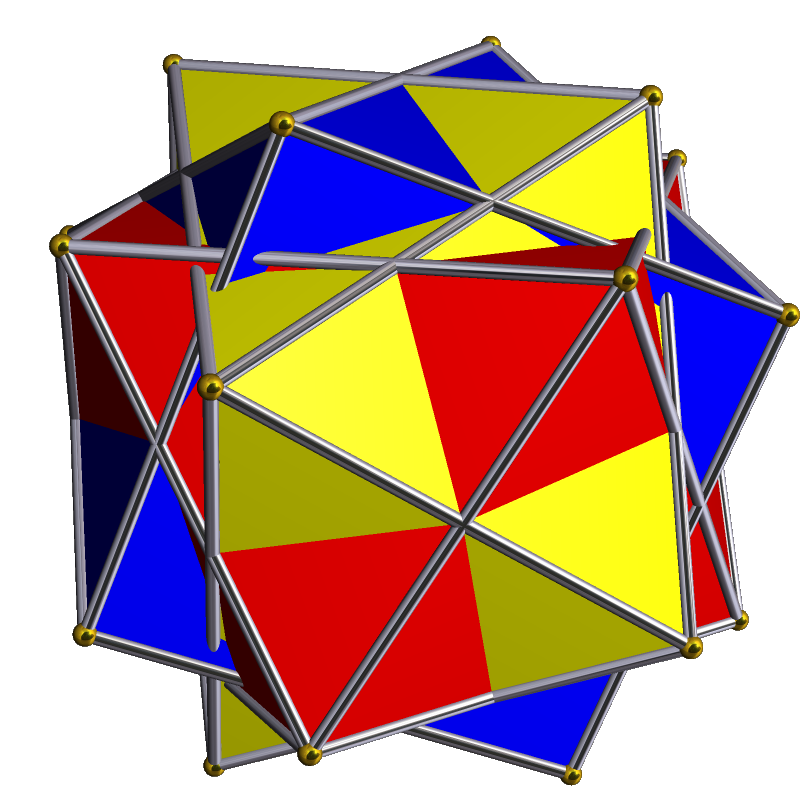

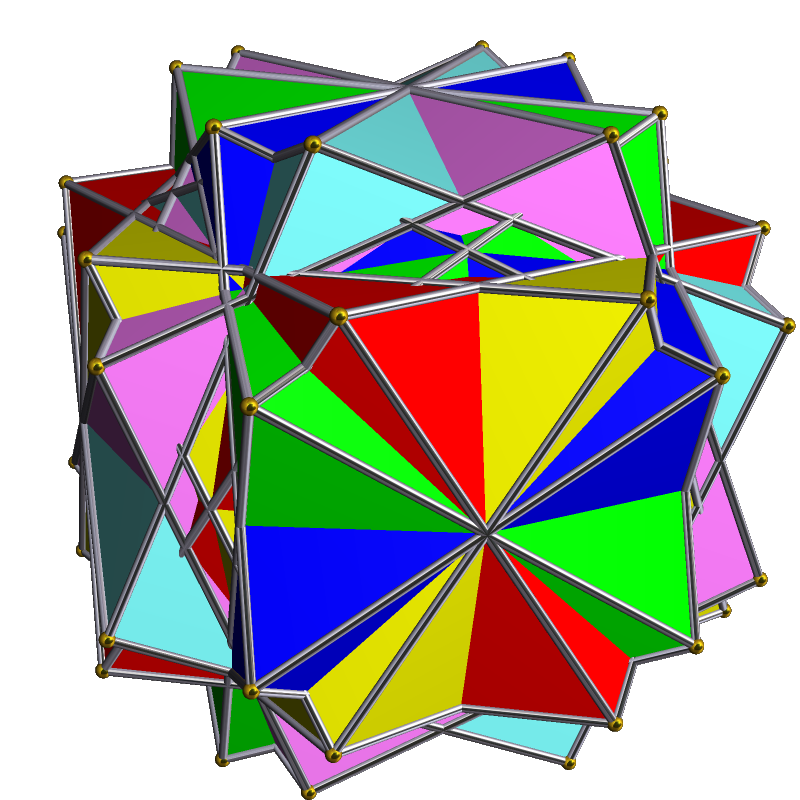

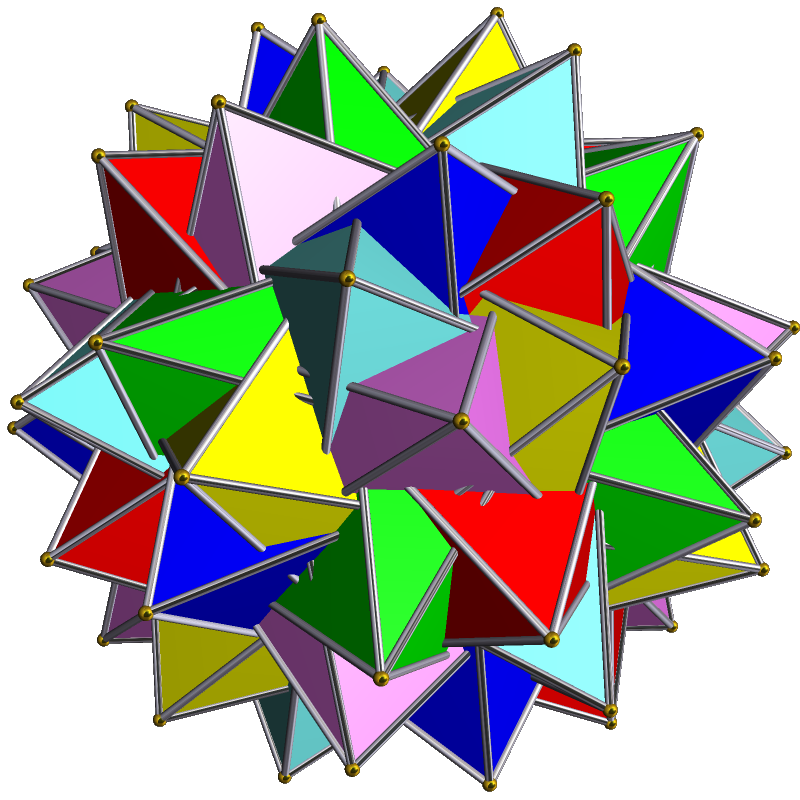

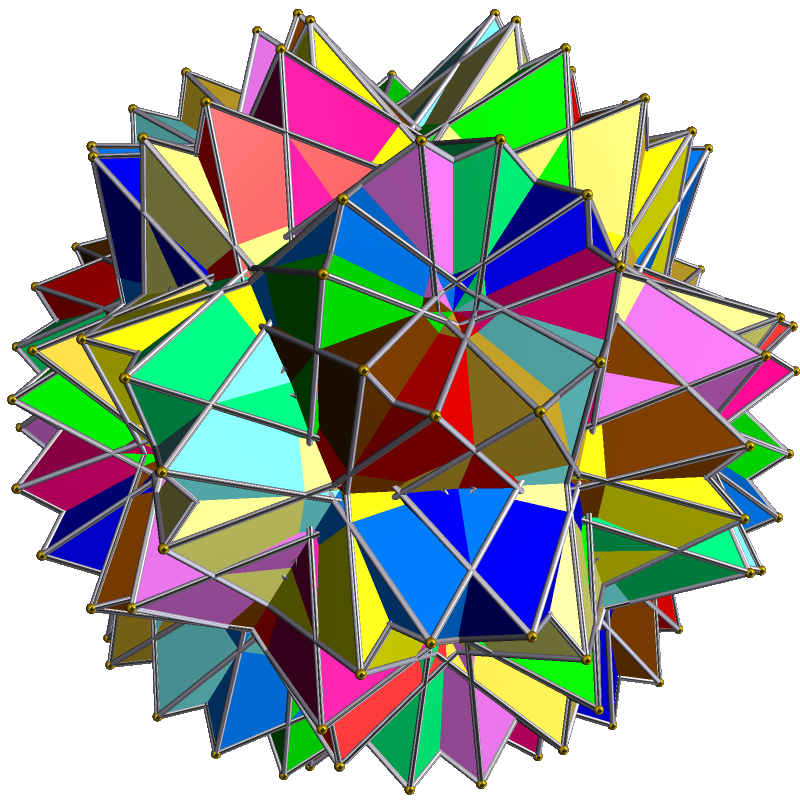

- 46-67: Tetrahedral symmetry embedded in octahedral or icosahedral symmetry,

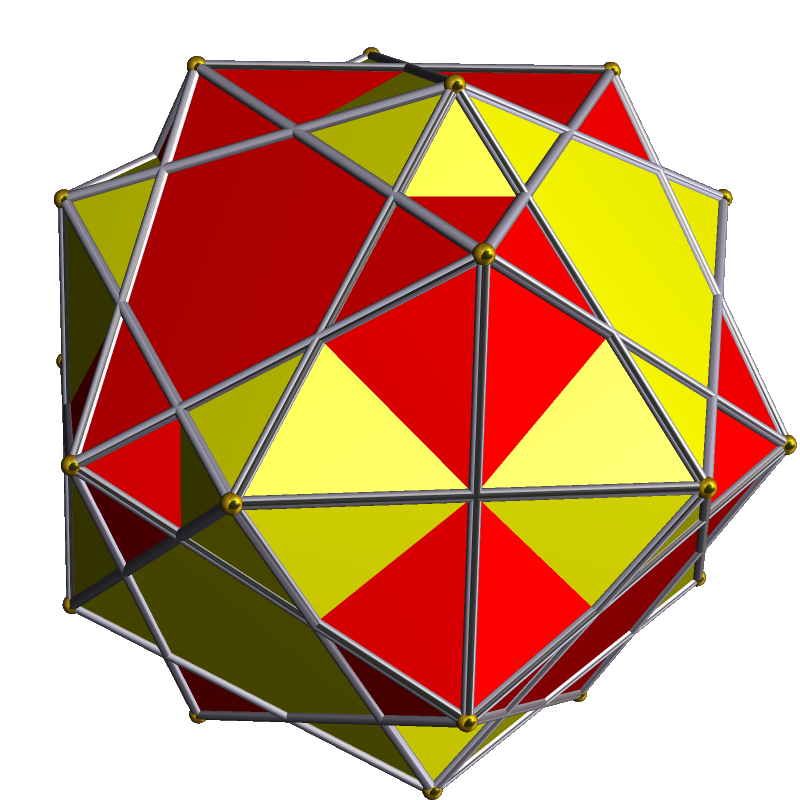

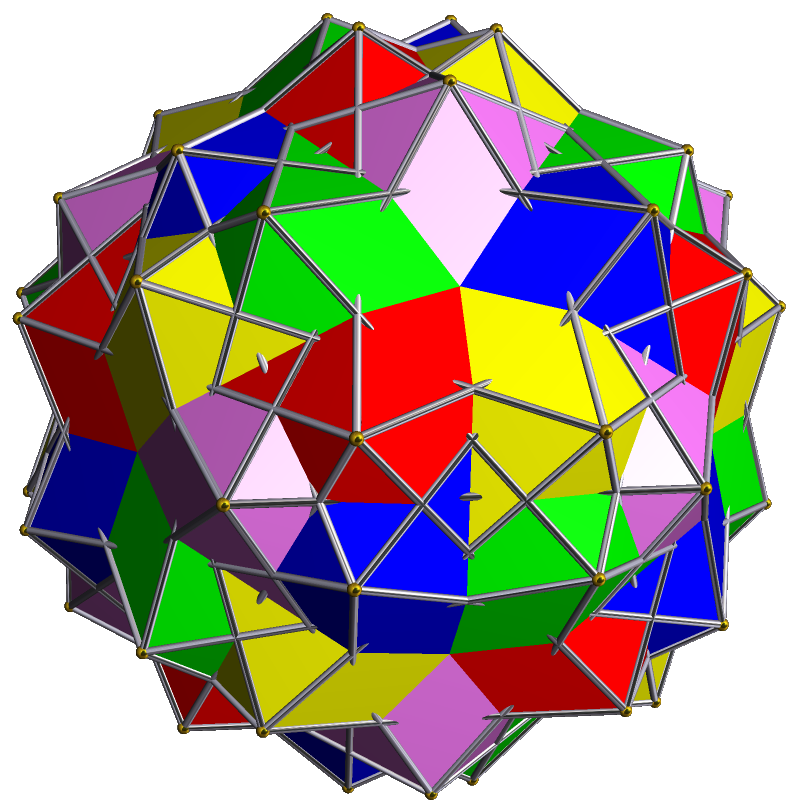

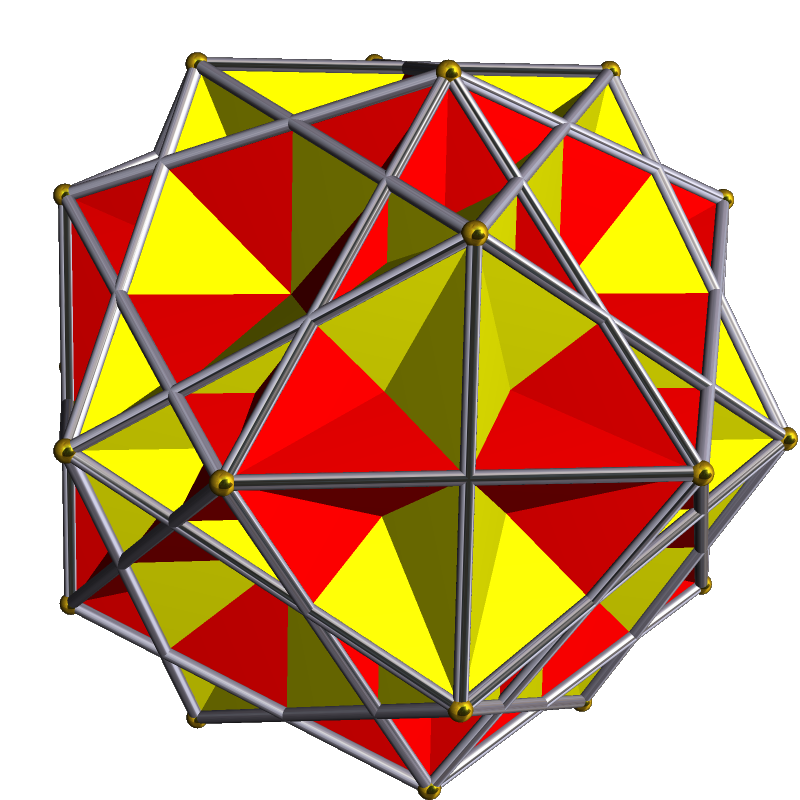

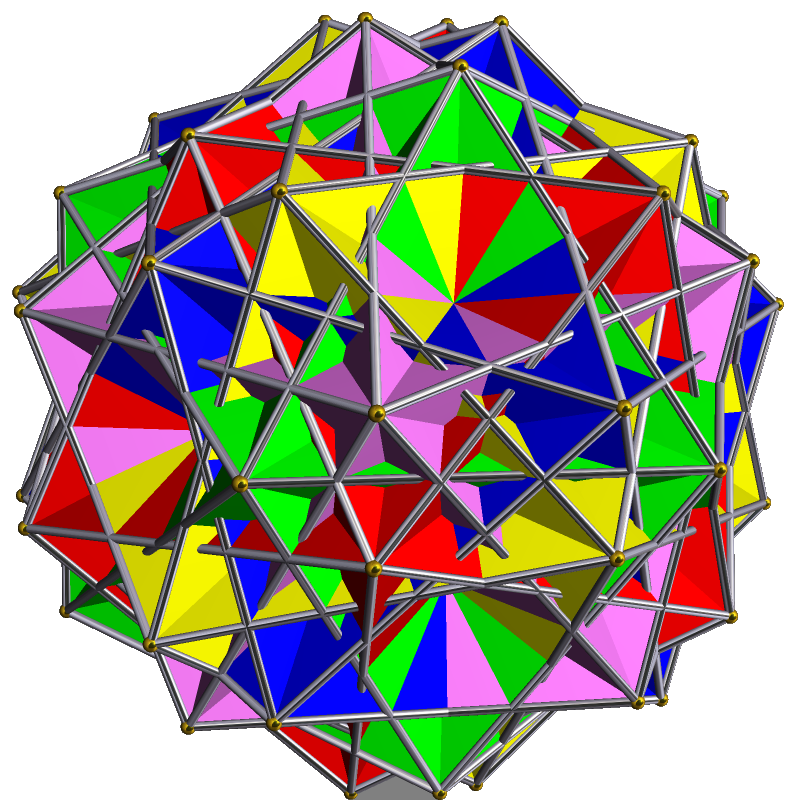

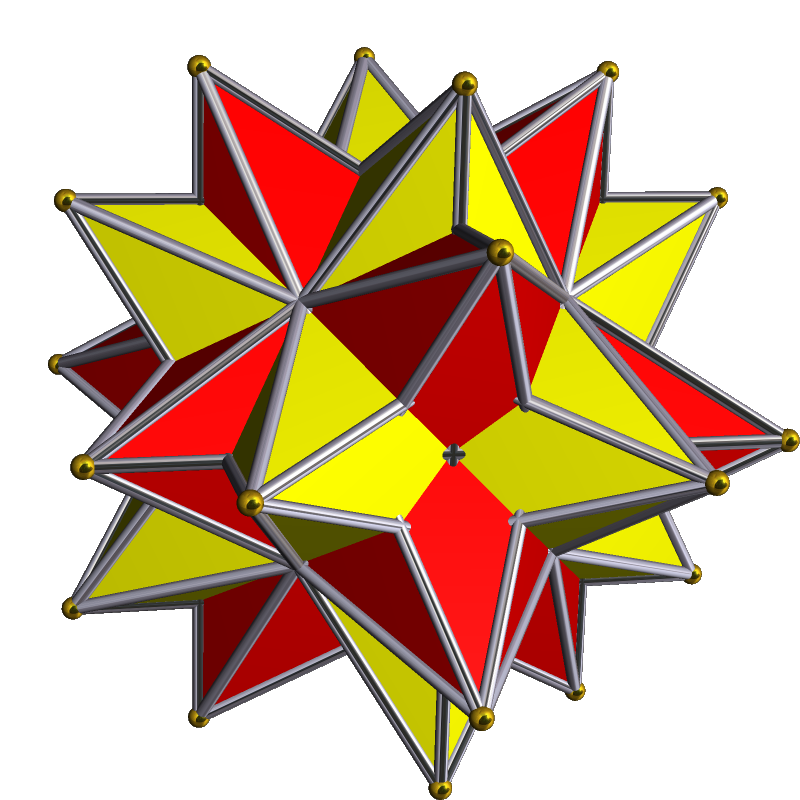

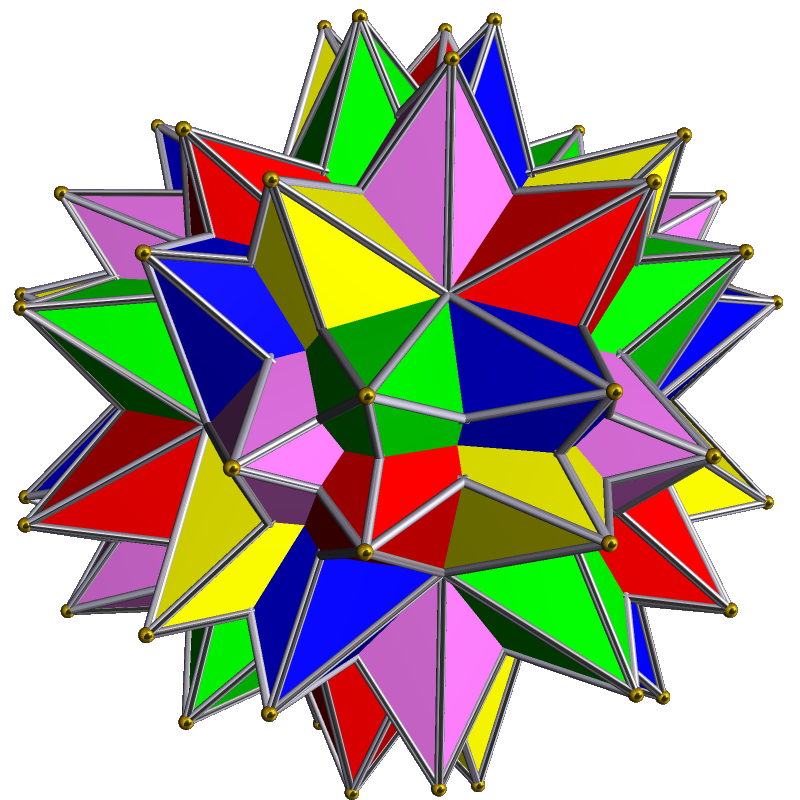

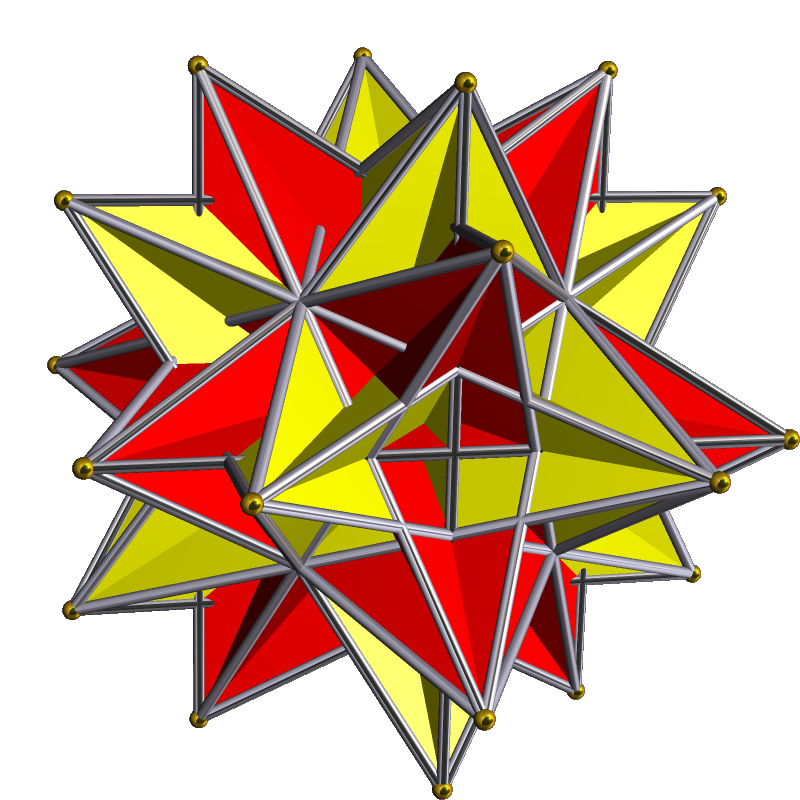

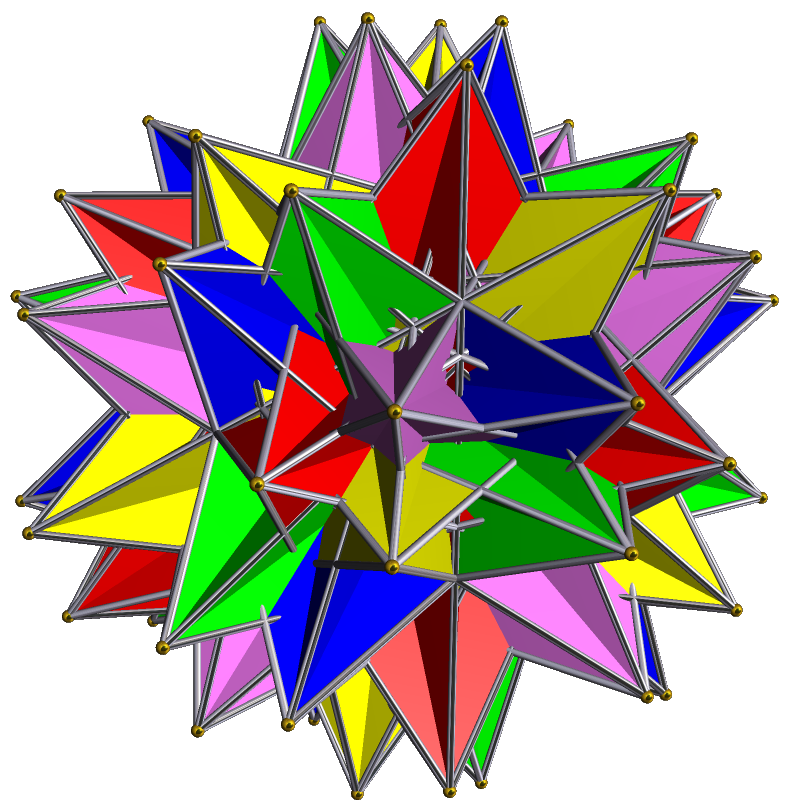

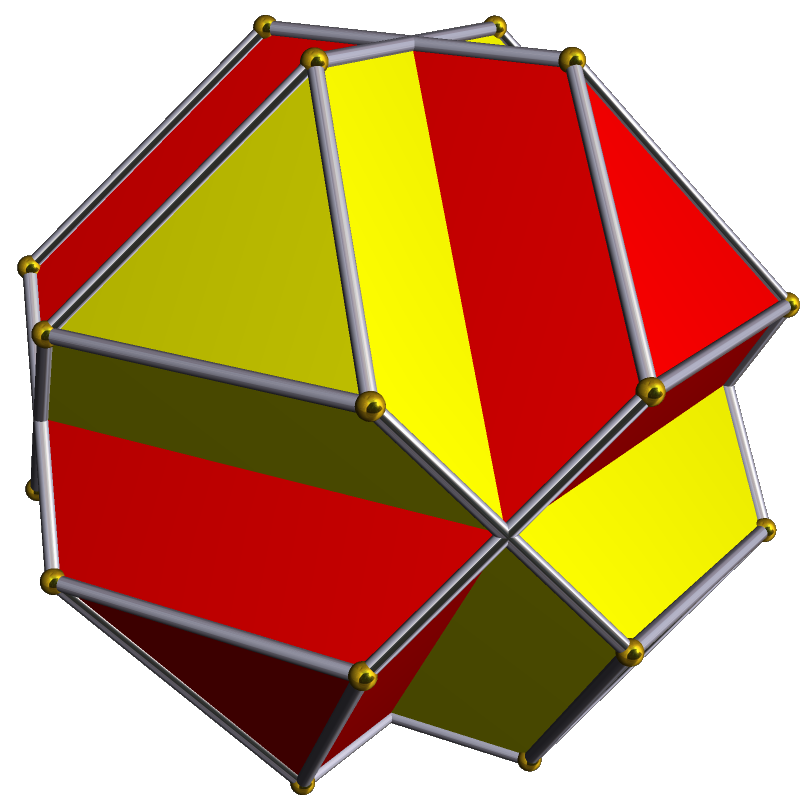

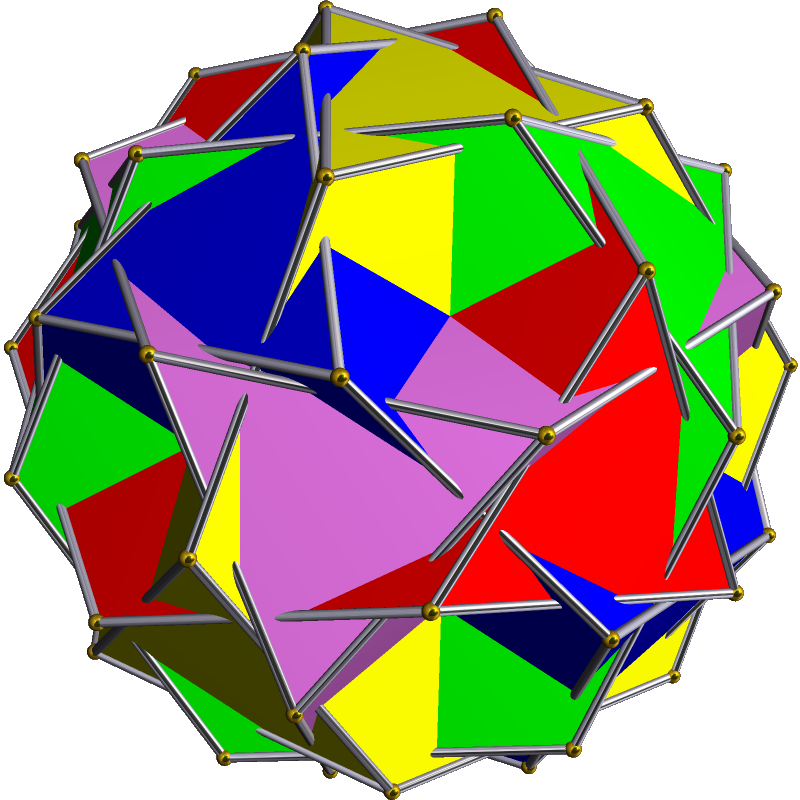

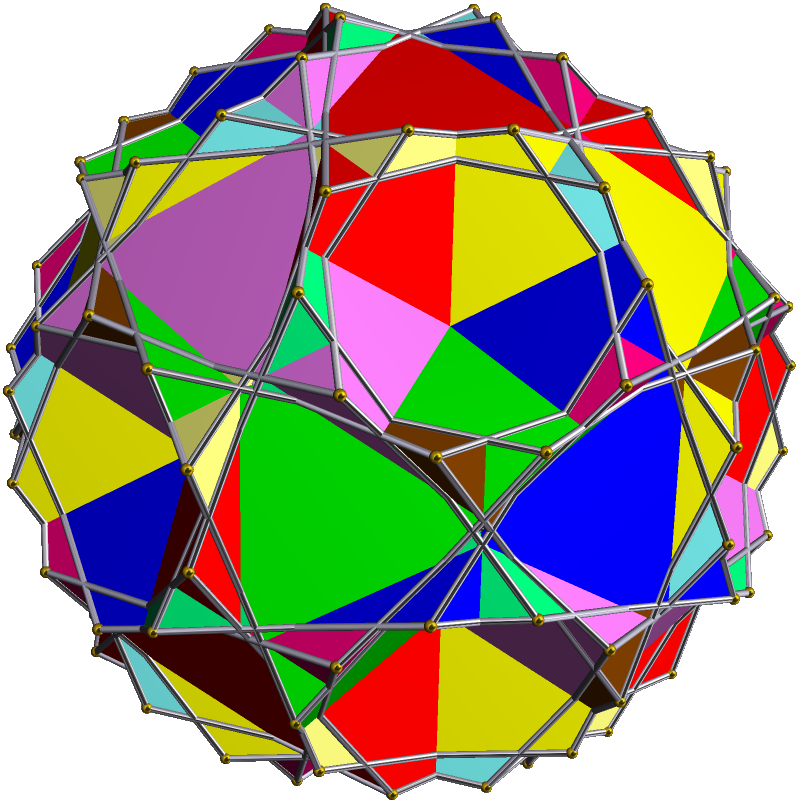

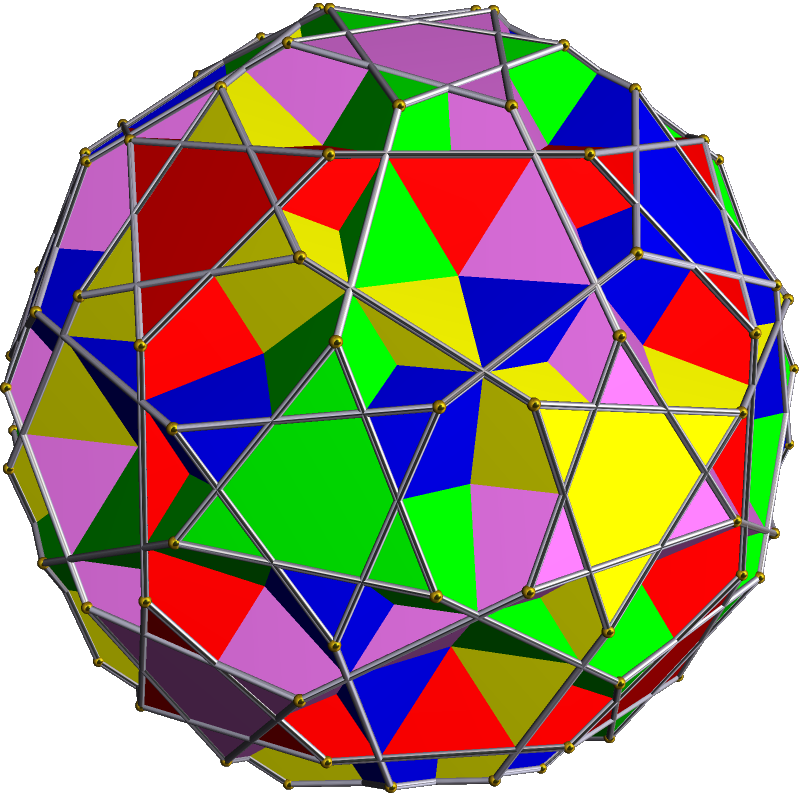

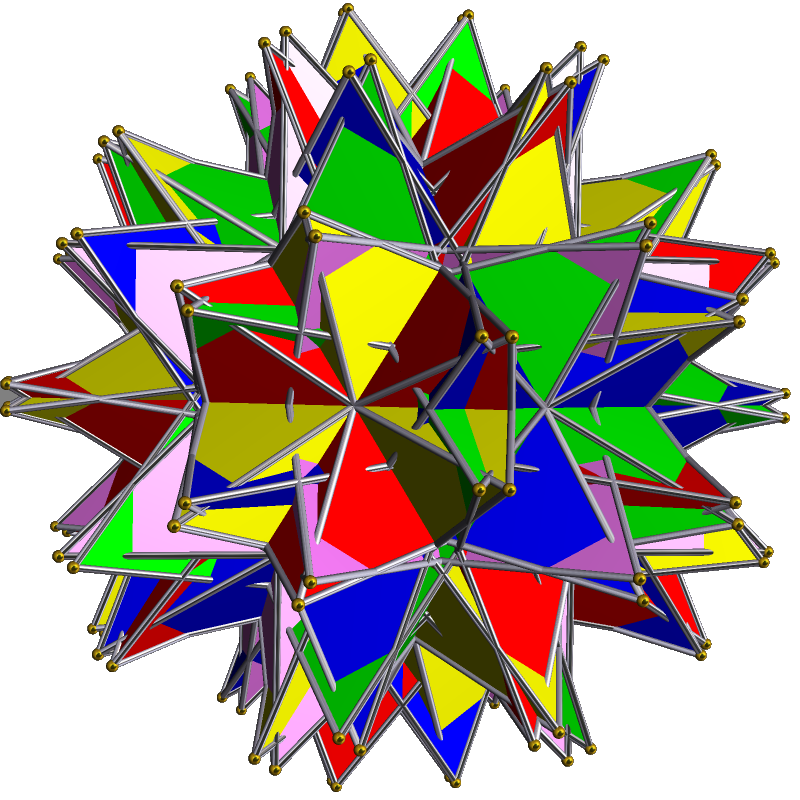

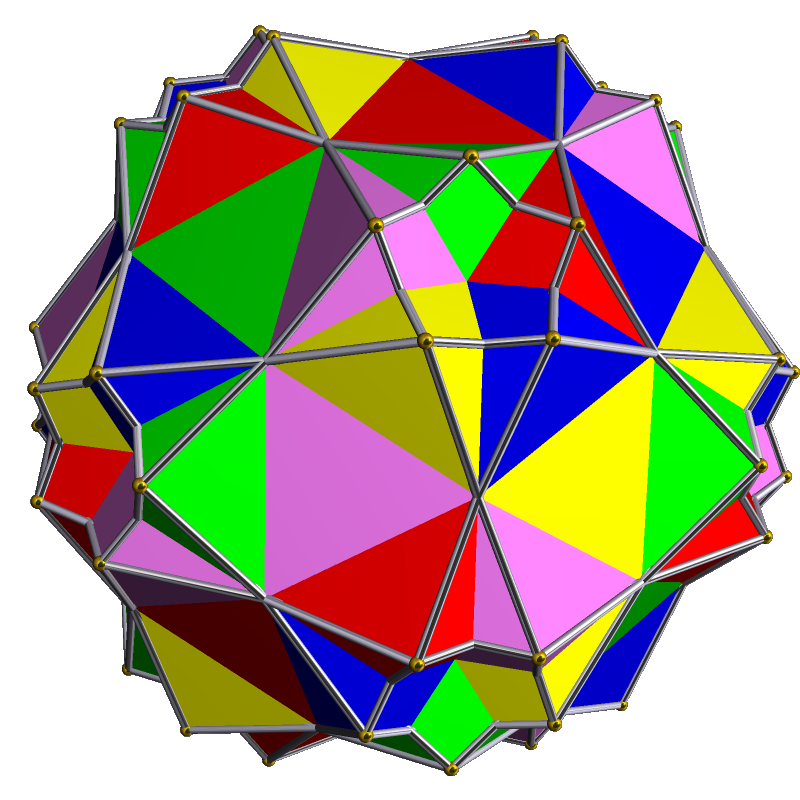

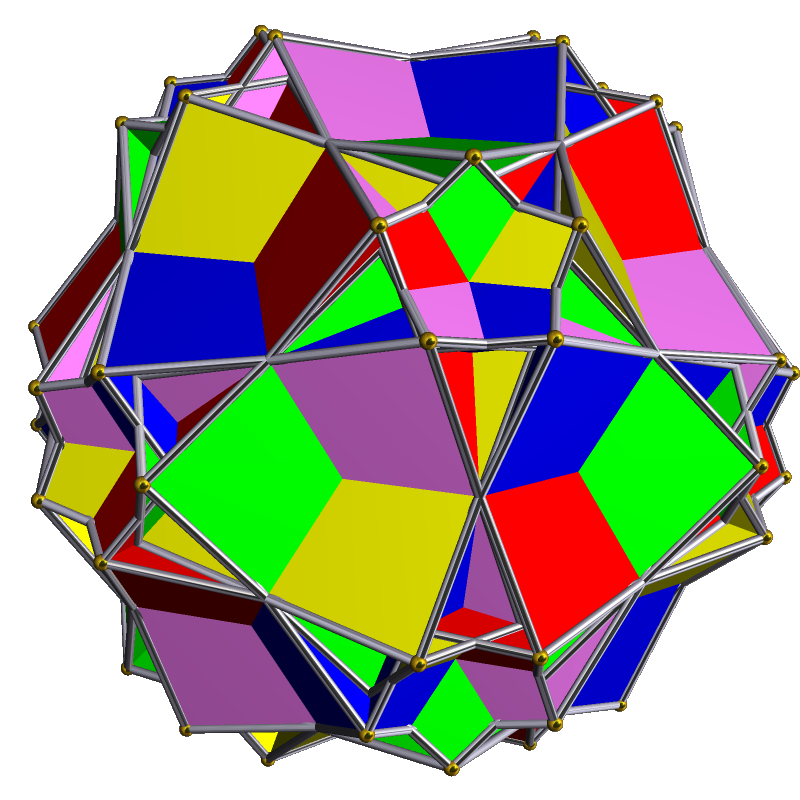

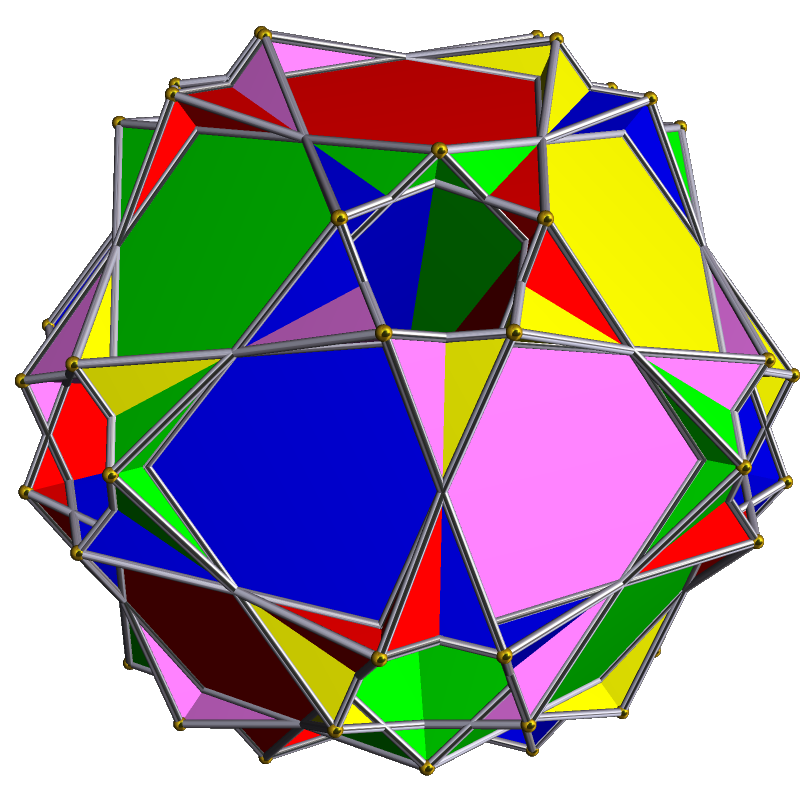

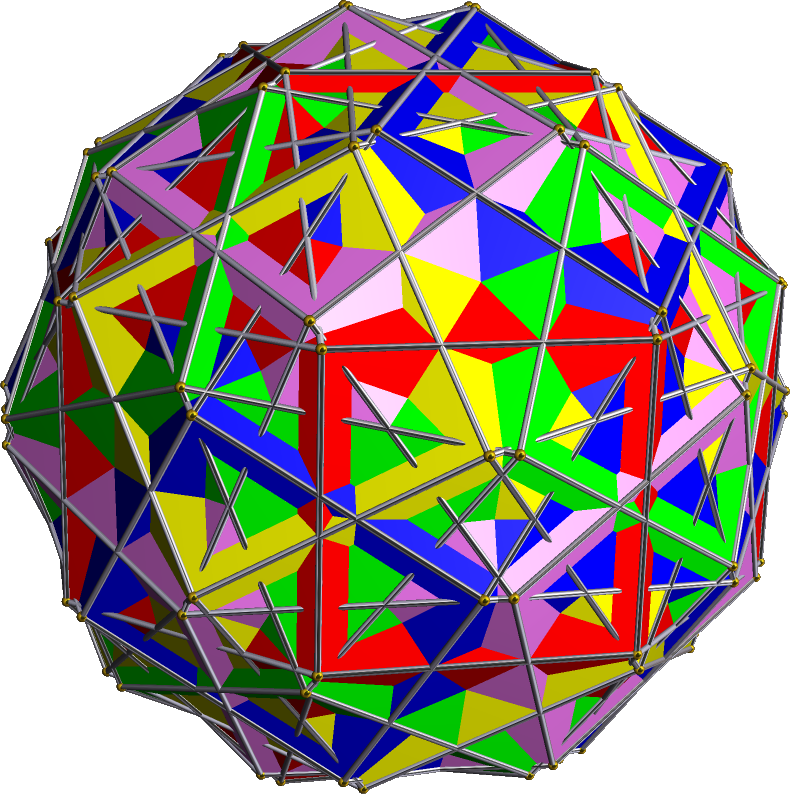

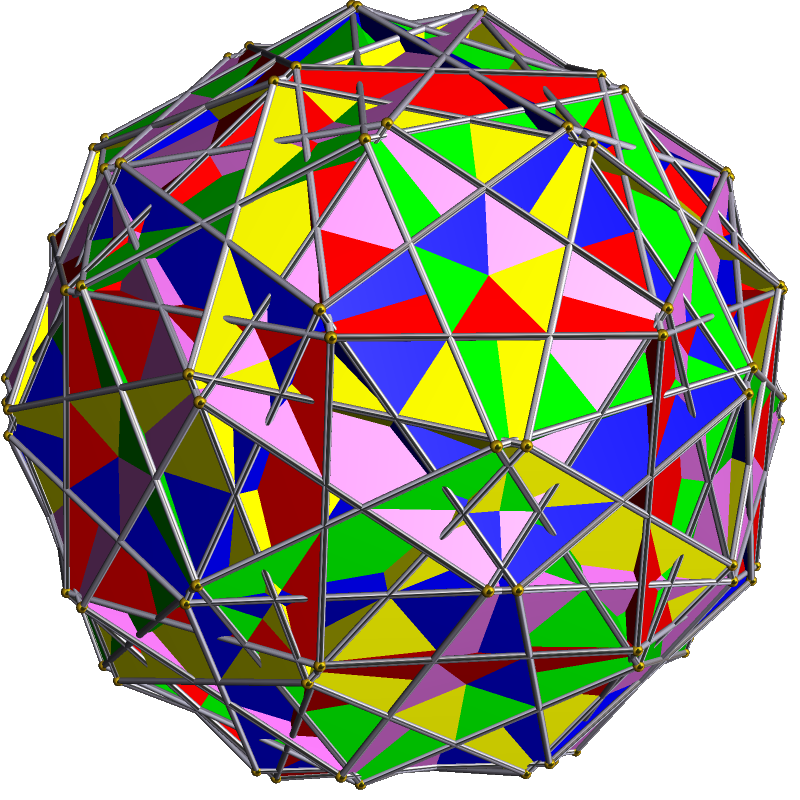

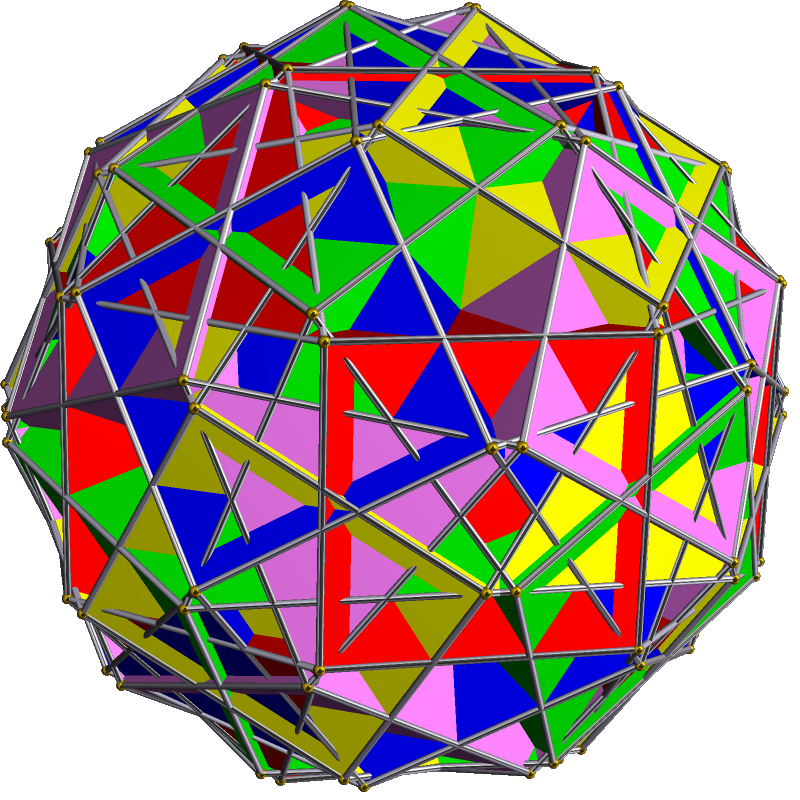

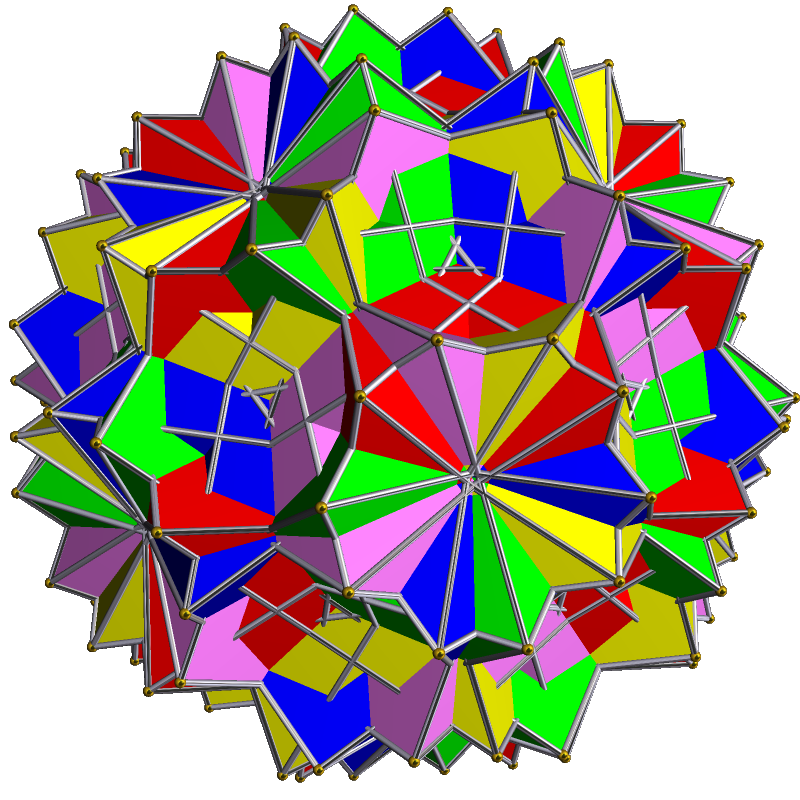

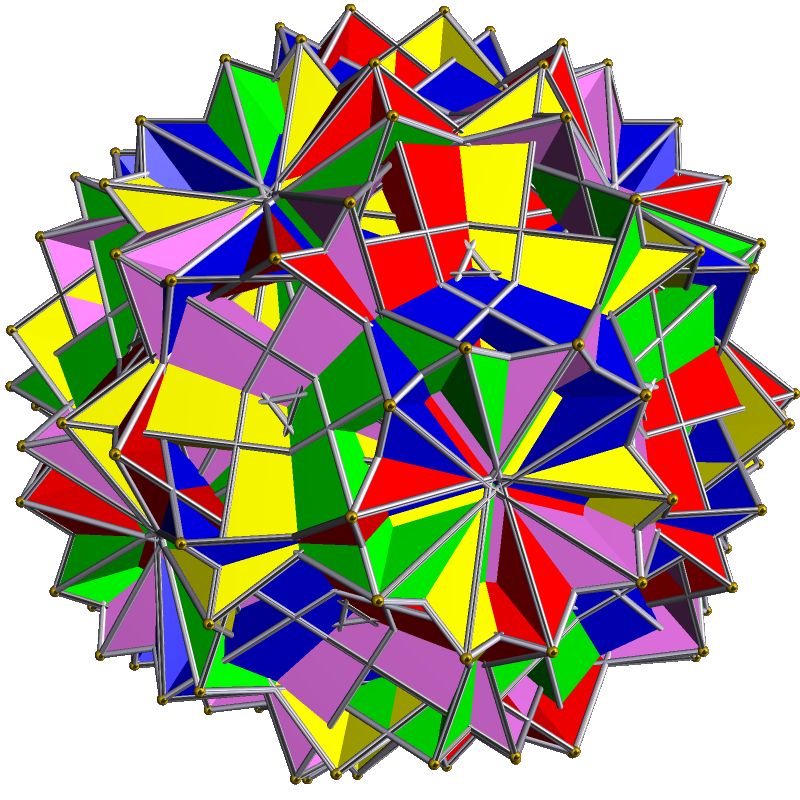

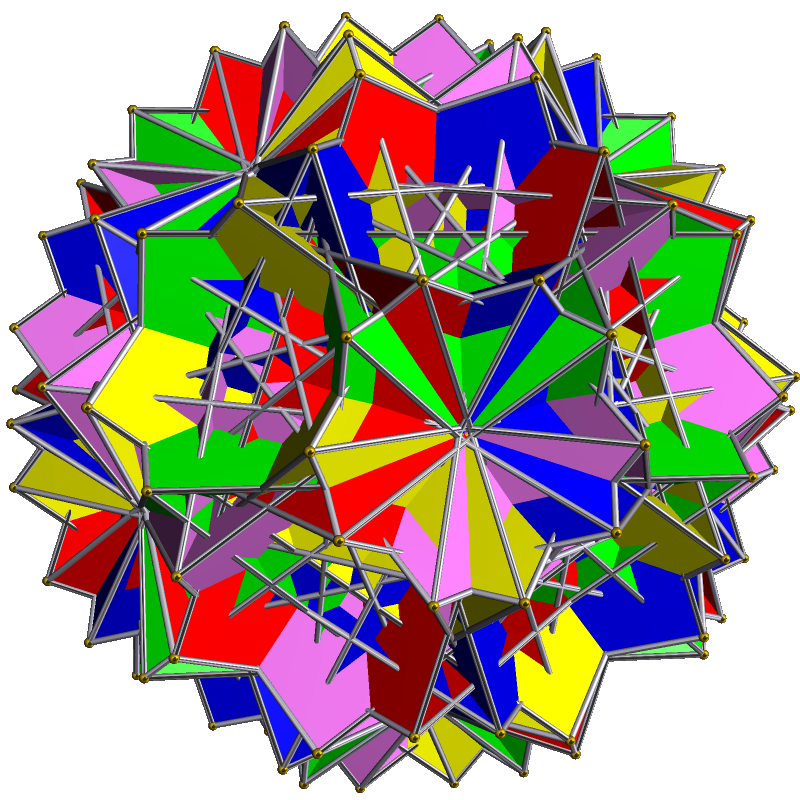

- 68-75: enantiomorph pairs

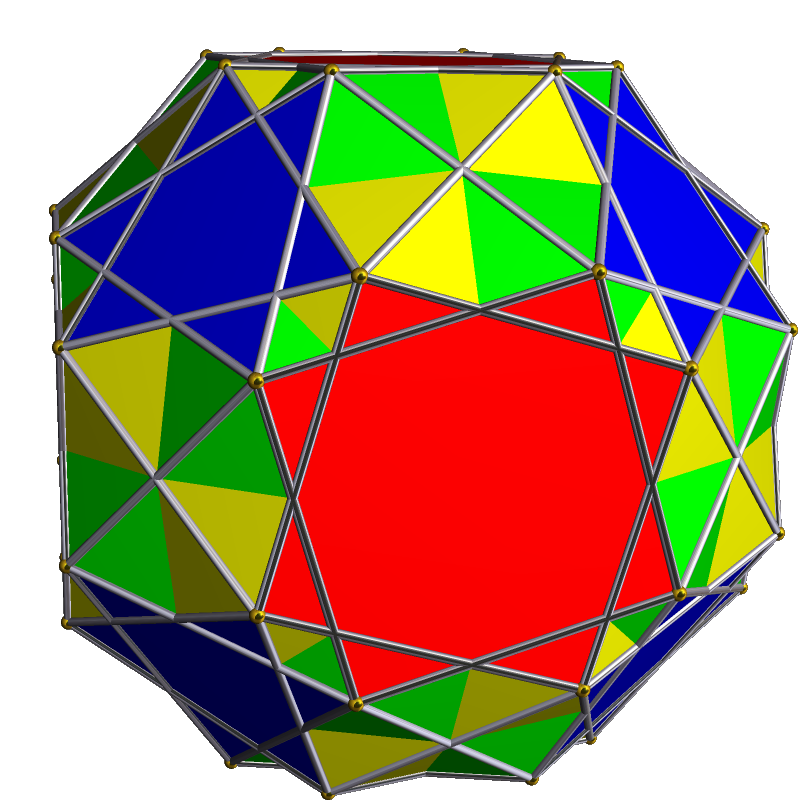

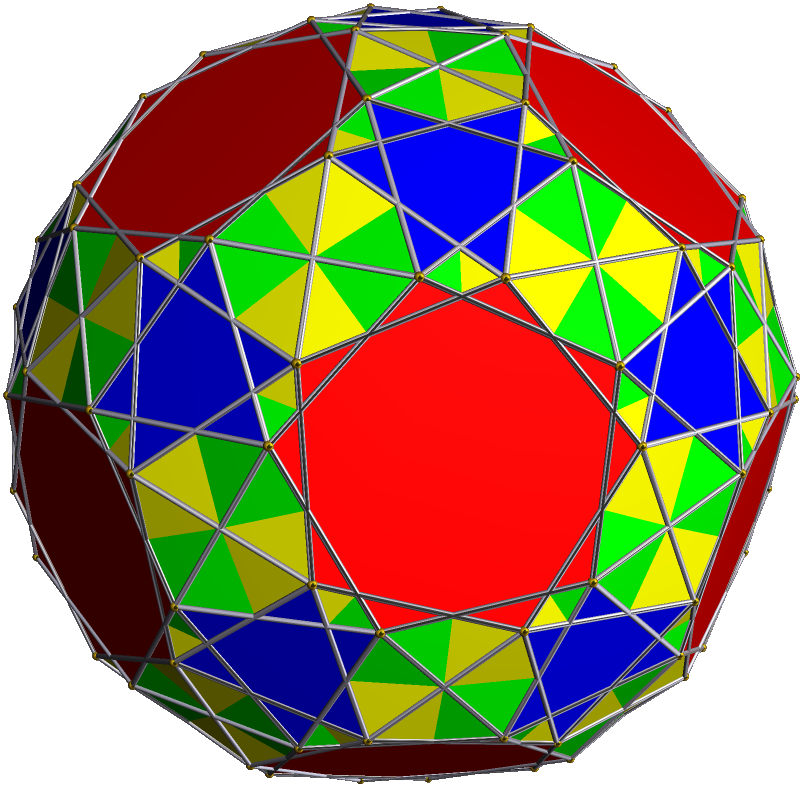

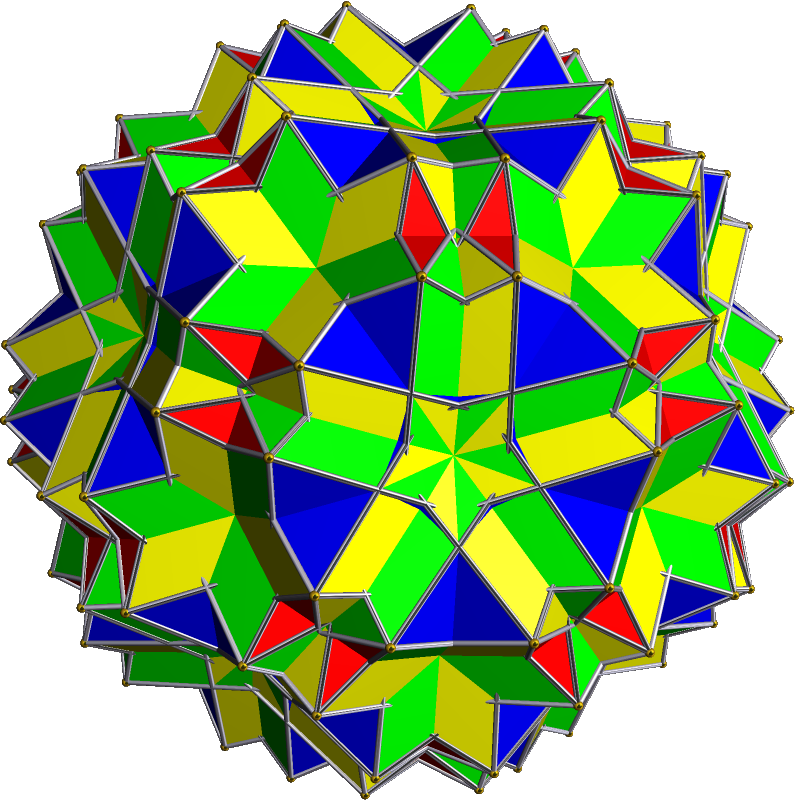

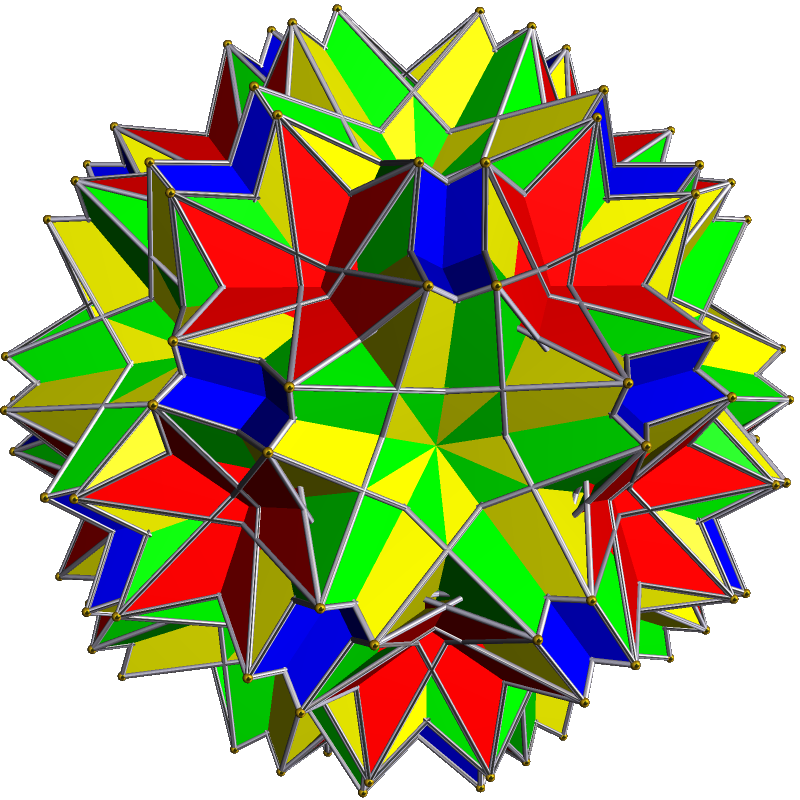

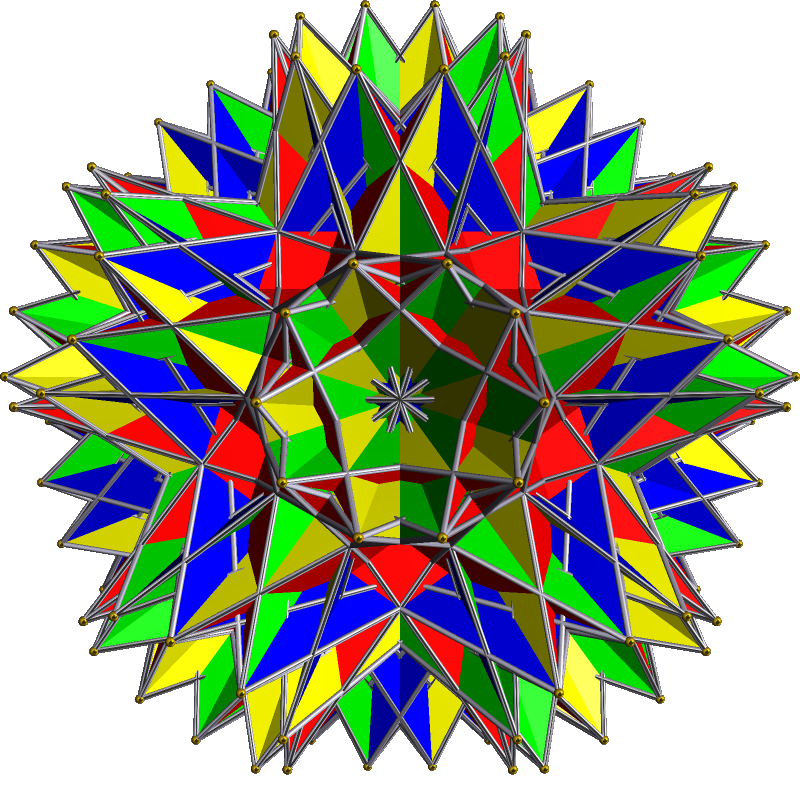

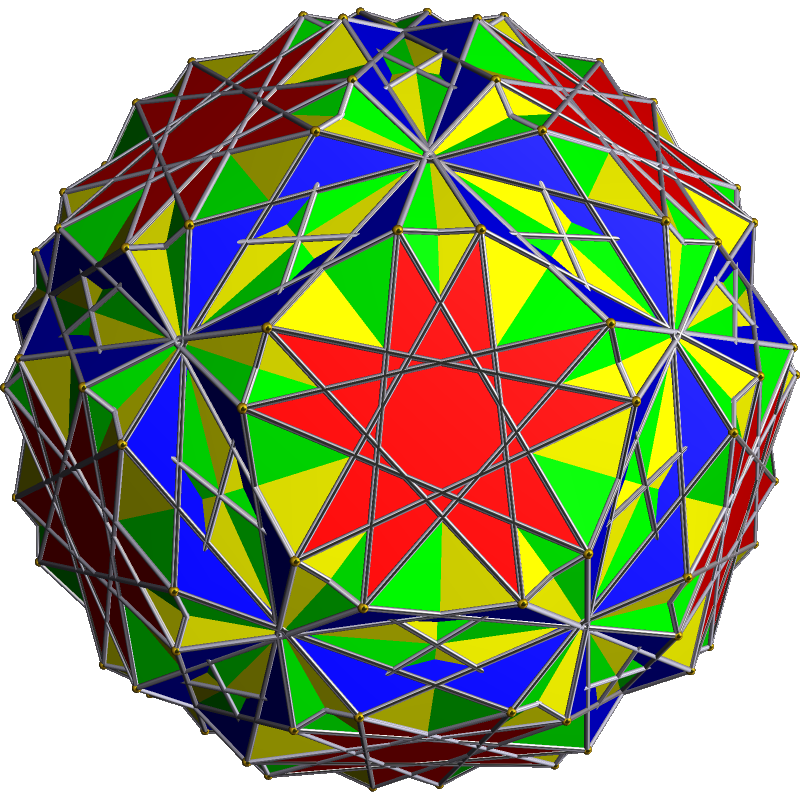

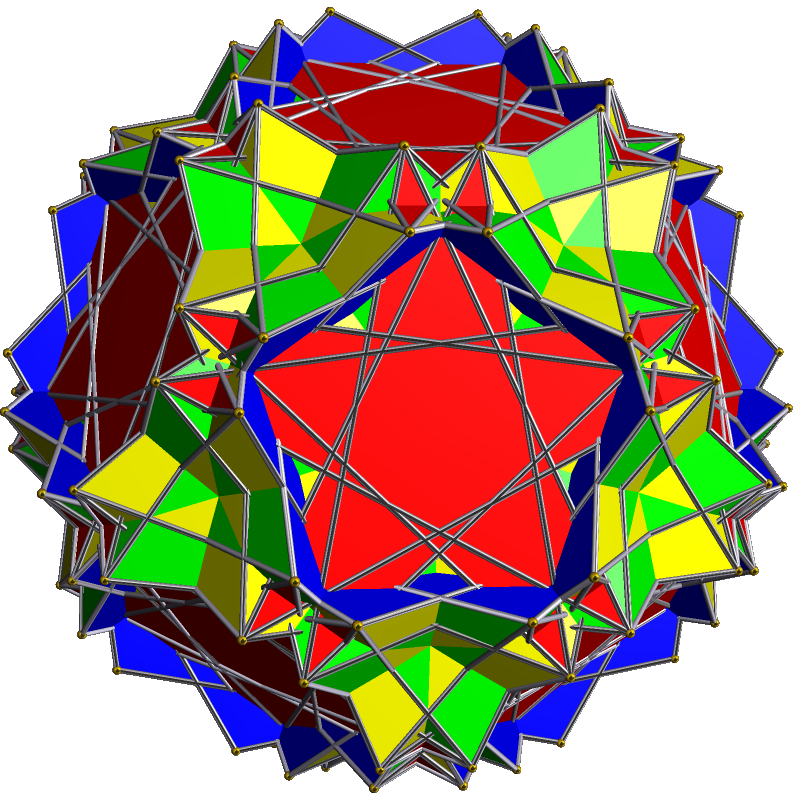

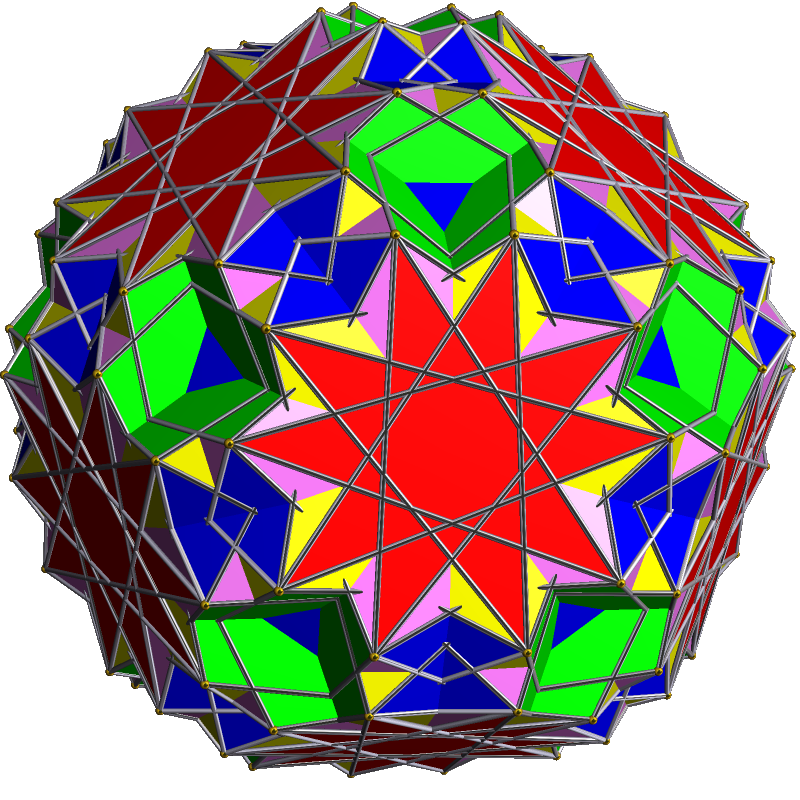

== Other compounds ==
The compound of four cubes (left) is neither a regular compound, nor a dual compound, nor a uniform compound. Its dual, the compound of four octahedra (right), is a uniform compound.

- Compound of three octahedra
- Compound of four cubes

Two polyhedra that are compounds but have their elements rigidly locked into place are the small complex icosidodecahedron (compound of icosahedron and great dodecahedron) and the great complex icosidodecahedron (compound of small stellated dodecahedron and great icosahedron). If the definition of a uniform polyhedron is generalised, they are uniform.

The section for enantiomorph pairs in Skilling's list does not contain the compound of two great snub dodecicosidodecahedra, as the pentagram faces would coincide. Removing the coincident faces results in the compound of twenty octahedra.

== 4-polytope compounds ==
Orthogonal projections
75 {4,3,3}	75 {3,3,4}

In 4-dimensions, there are a large number of regular compounds of regular polytopes. Coxeter lists a few of these in his book Regular Polytopes. McMullen added six in his paper New Regular Compounds of 4-Polytopes.

Self-duals:

Compound	Constituent	Symmetry
120 5-cells	5-cell	[5,3,3], order 14400
120 5-cells^{(var)}	5-cell	order 1200
720 5-cells	5-cell	[5,3,3], order 14400
5 24-cells	24-cell	[5,3,3], order 14400

Dual pairs:

Compound 1	Compound 2	Symmetry
3 16-cells	3 tesseracts	[3,4,3], order 1152
15 16-cells	15 tesseracts	[5,3,3], order 14400
75 16-cells	75 tesseracts	[5,3,3], order 14400
75 16-cells^{(var)}	75 tesseracts^{(var)}	order 600
300 16-cells	300 tesseracts	[5,3,3]^{+}, order 7200
600 16-cells	600 tesseracts	[5,3,3], order 14400
25 24-cells	25 24-cells	[5,3,3], order 14400

Uniform compounds and duals with convex 4-polytopes:

Compound 1 Vertex-transitive	Compound 2 Cell-transitive	Symmetry
2 16-cells	2 tesseracts	[4,3,3], order 384
100 24-cells	100 24-cells	[5,3,3]^{+}, order 7200
200 24-cells	200 24-cells	[5,3,3], order 14400
5 600-cells	5 120-cells	[5,3,3]^{+}, order 7200
10 600-cells	10 120-cells	[5,3,3], order 14400
25 24-cells^{(var)}	25 24-cells^{(var)}	order 600

The superscript (var) in the tables above indicates that the labeled compounds are distinct from the other compounds with the same number of constituents.

=== Compounds with regular star 4-polytopes ===
Self-dual star compounds:

Compound	Symmetry
5 {5,5/2,5}	[5,3,3]^{+}, order 7200
10 {5,5/2,5}	[5,3,3], order 14400
5 {5/2,5,5/2}	[5,3,3]^{+}, order 7200
10 {5/2,5,5/2}	[5,3,3], order 14400

Dual pairs of compound stars:

Compound 1	Compound 2	Symmetry
5 {3,5,5/2}	5 {5/2,5,3}	[5,3,3]^{+}, order 7200
10 {3,5,5/2}	10 {5/2,5,3}	[5,3,3], order 14400
5 {5,5/2,3}	5 {3,5/2,5}	[5,3,3]^{+}, order 7200
10 {5,5/2,3}	10 {3,5/2,5}	[5,3,3], order 14400
5 {5/2,3,5}	5 {5,3,5/2}	[5,3,3]^{+}, order 7200
10 {5/2,3,5}	10 {5,3,5/2}	[5,3,3], order 14400

Uniform compound stars and duals:

Compound 1 Vertex-transitive	Compound 2 Cell-transitive	Symmetry
5 {3,3,5/2}	5 {5/2,3,3}	[5,3,3]^{+}, order 7200
10 {3,3,5/2}	10 {5/2,3,3}	[5,3,3], order 14400

=== Compounds with duals ===
Dual positions:

Compound	Constituent	Symmetry
2 5-cell	5-cell	[[3,3,3]], order 240
2 24-cell	24-cell	[[3,4,3]], order 2304
1 tesseract, 1 16-cell	tesseract, 16-cell	
1 120-cell, 1 600-cell	120-cell, 600-cell	
2 great 120-cell	great 120-cell	
2 grand stellated 120-cell	grand stellated 120-cell	
1 icosahedral 120-cell, 1 small stellated 120-cell	icosahedral 120-cell, small stellated 120-cell	
1 grand 120-cell, 1 great stellated 120-cell	grand 120-cell, great stellated 120-cell	
1 great grand 120-cell, 1 great icosahedral 120-cell	great grand 120-cell, great icosahedral 120-cell	
1 great grand stellated 120-cell, 1 grand 600-cell	great grand stellated 120-cell, grand 600-cell	

== Group theory ==
In terms of group theory, if G is the symmetry group of a polyhedral compound, and the group acts transitively on the polyhedra (so that each polyhedron can be sent to any of the others, as in uniform compounds), then if H is the stabilizer of a single chosen polyhedron, the polyhedra can be identified with the orbit space G/H – the coset gH corresponds to which polyhedron g sends the chosen polyhedron to.

== Compounds of tilings ==
There are eighteen two-parameter families of regular compound tessellations of the Euclidean plane. In the hyperbolic plane, five one-parameter families and seventeen isolated cases are known, but the completeness of this listing has not been enumerated.

The Euclidean and hyperbolic compound families 2 {p,p} (4 ≤ p ≤ ∞, p an integer) are analogous to the spherical stella octangula, 2 {3,3}.

A few examples of Euclidean and hyperbolic regular compounds
Self-dual	Duals		Self-dual
2 {4,4}	2 {6,3}	2 {3,6}	2 {∞,∞}
	3 {6,3}	3 {3,6}	3 {∞,∞}

A known family of regular Euclidean compound honeycombs in any number of dimensions is an infinite family of compounds of hypercubic honeycombs, all sharing vertices and faces with another hypercubic honeycomb. This compound can have any number of hypercubic honeycombs.

There are also dual-regular tiling compounds. A simple example is the E^{2} compound of a hexagonal tiling and its dual triangular tiling, which shares its edges with the deltoidal trihexagonal tiling. The Euclidean compounds of two hypercubic honeycombs are both regular and dual-regular.

== See also ==
- List of regular polytope compounds
