= Bopper =

Bopper or boppers may refer to:

- Bopper, someone involved with bebop music
- The Boppers, a Swedish music group that had a number-one single in Sweden
- Peanut Butter Boppers, a snack manufactured by General Mills

== See also ==
- The Big Bopper, early rock-a-roll star
- Teenybopper, a teenage subculture
- Deely bopper, head ornamentation
- Sock'em boppers, a children's toy
- Little Boppers and Monster Boppers, toys made by Worlds of Wonder
- Beanie Boppers and Teenie Beanie Boppers, toy doll variations of Beanie Babies made by Ty Inc. from 2001 to 2005
- Bop (disambiguation)
- Popper (disambiguation)
