= Guillaume Postel =

French linguist, astronomer, diplomat, and professor (1510–1581)

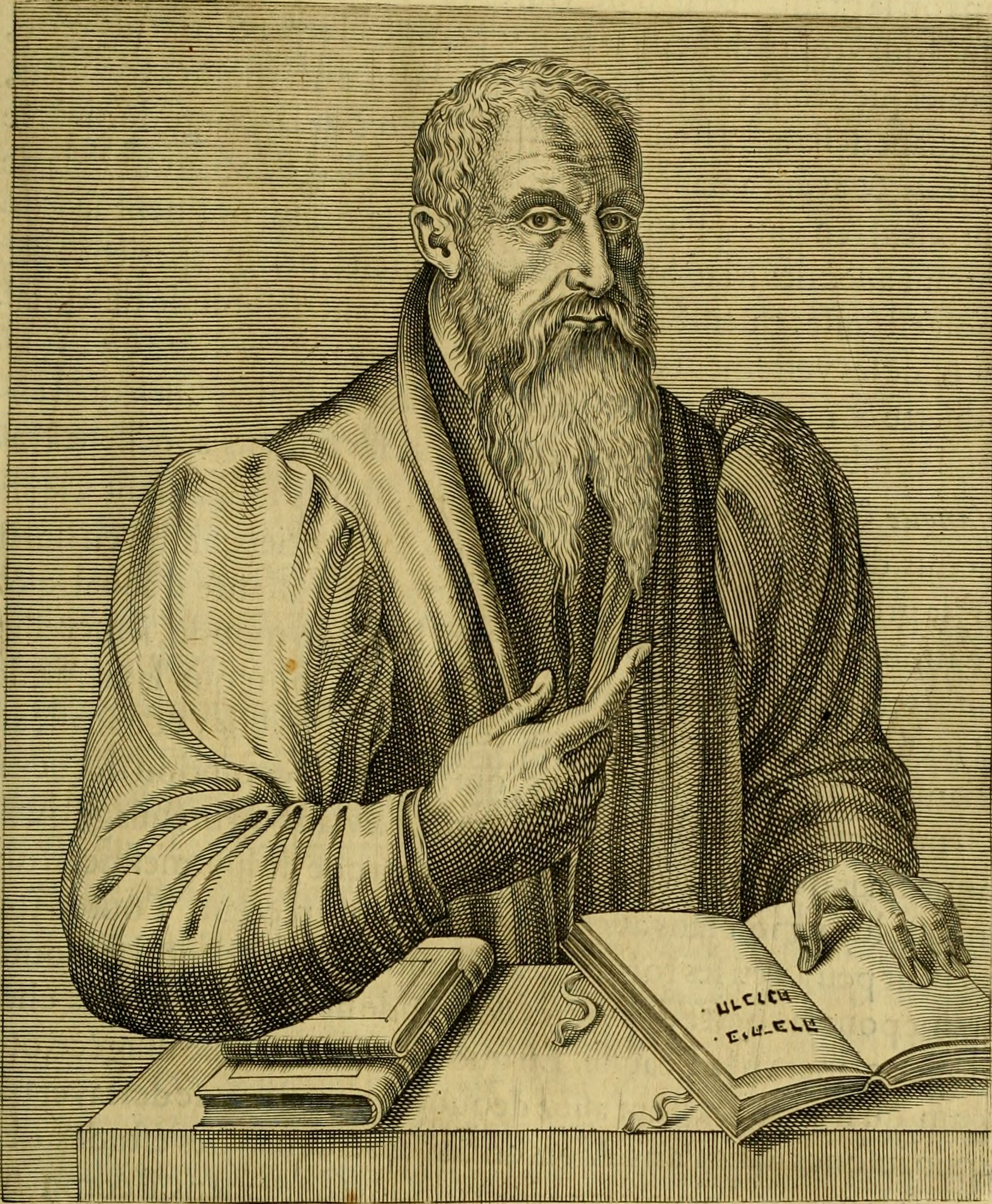
- Postel as depicted in Les vrais pourtraits et vies des hommes illustres grecz, latins et payens (1584) by André Thevet
- Born: 25 March 1510; Barenton
- Died: 6 September 1581 (aged 71); Paris
- Education: Collège Sainte-Barbe
- Occupations: Astronomer, Diplomat, Professor & Writer
- Movement: Ignatius of Loyola & Society of Jesus

Guillaume Postel (25 March 1510 – 6 September 1581) was a French linguist, Orientalist, astronomer, Christian Kabbalist, diplomat, polyglot, professor, religious universalist, and writer.

Born in the village of Barenton in Normandy, Postel made his way to Paris to further his education. While studying at the Collège Sainte-Barbe, he became acquainted with Ignatius of Loyola and many of the men who would become the founders of the Society of Jesus, retaining a lifelong affiliation with them. He entered Rome in the novitiate of the Jesuits in March 1544, but left on December 9, 1545 before making religious vows.

== Diplomacy and scholarship ==
Postel was adept at Arabic, Hebrew, and Syriac and other Semitic languages, as well as the Classical languages of Ancient Greek and Latin, and soon came to the attention of the French court.

=== Travel to the Ottoman Empire ===
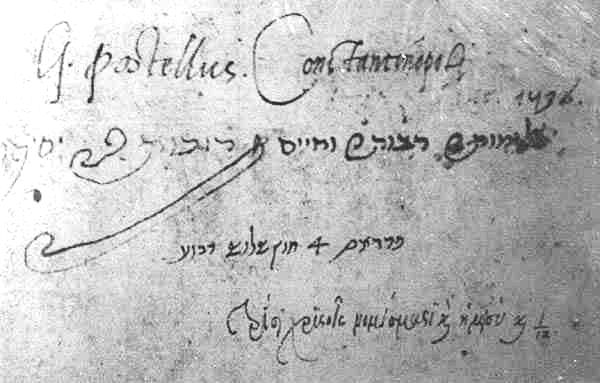
Note of Guillaume Postel on the Arabic astronomical manuscript of al-Kharaqī, Muntahā al-idrāk fī taqāsīm al-aflāk ("The Ultimate Grasp of the Divisions of Spheres"), 1536, Constantinople

In 1536, when Francis I sought a Franco-Ottoman alliance with the Ottoman Turks, he sent Postel as the official interpreter of the French embassy of Jean de La Forêt to the Ottoman sultan Suleiman the Magnificent in Constantinople. Postel was also apparently assigned to gather interesting Eastern manuscripts for the royal library, today housed in the collection of oriental manuscripts at the Bibliothèque Nationale in Paris.

=== Works ===
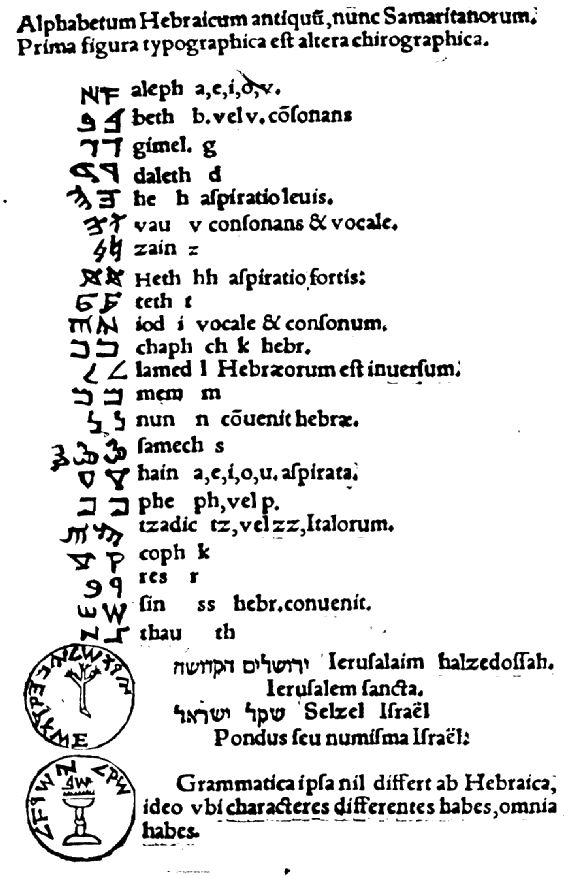
Page from Linguarum Duodecim Characteribus Differentium Alphabetum Introductio including what is thought to be the first Western representation of a Hasmonean coin

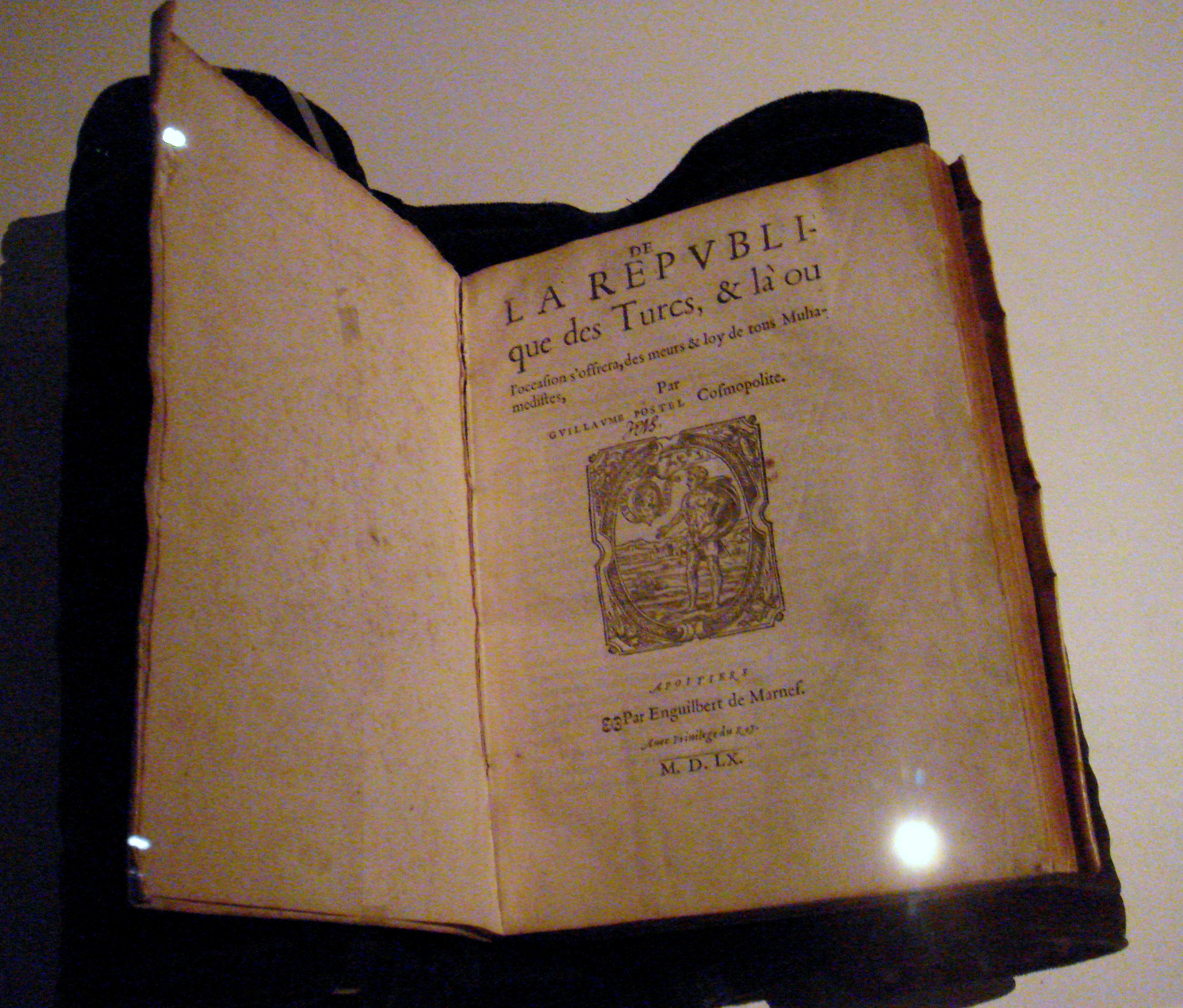
De la République des Turcs, Guillaume Postel, Poitiers, 1560

In Linguarum Duodecim Characteribus Differentium Alphabetum Introductio ("An Introduction to the Alphabetic Characters of Twelve Different Languages"), published in 1538, Postel became the first scholar to recognize the inscriptions on Judean coins from the period of the First Jewish–Roman War as Hebrew written in the ancient "Samaritan" characters.

In 1543, Postel published a criticism of Protestantism, and highlighted parallels between Islam and Protestantism in Alcorani seu legis Mahometi et Evangelistarum concordiae liber ("The book of concord between the Coran and the Evangelicals").

In 1544, in De orbis terrae concordia ("Concerning the Harmony of the Earth"), Postel advocated a universalist world religion. The thesis of the book was that all Jews, Muslims, Hindus, Buddhists and Pagans could be converted to Christianity once all of the religions of the world were shown to have common foundations and that the Christian religion best represented these foundations. He believed these foundations to be the love and praise of God, and love and helping of humankind.

In De la République des Turcs ("Of the Turkish Republic"), Postel describes Ottoman society rather positively. His 1553 Des merveilles du monde et principalemẽt des admirables choses des Indes & du nouveau monde is one of the earliest European descriptions of religion in Japan. He interprets Japanese religion in terms of his universalist views on religion, claiming that the indigenous Japanese religion was a form of Christianity and that one could still find evidence of their worship of crucifixes. Such claims about Japanese religion were common in Europe at the time; Postel's writings may have influenced Francis Xavier's expectations of Japan as he traveled there.

Postel was also a relentless advocate of the unification of all Christian churches, a common concern during the period of the Protestant Reformation, and remarkably tolerant of other faiths during a time when such tolerance was unusual. This tendency led him to work with the Jesuits in Rome and then Venice, but the incompatibility of their doctrine with his beliefs prevented his full membership in their order. Riccioli provides an alternative account in his biography of Postel in Almagestum Novum - that Postel was ejected by St. Ignatius from the Jesuits after taking his vows.

=== Cartographer ===
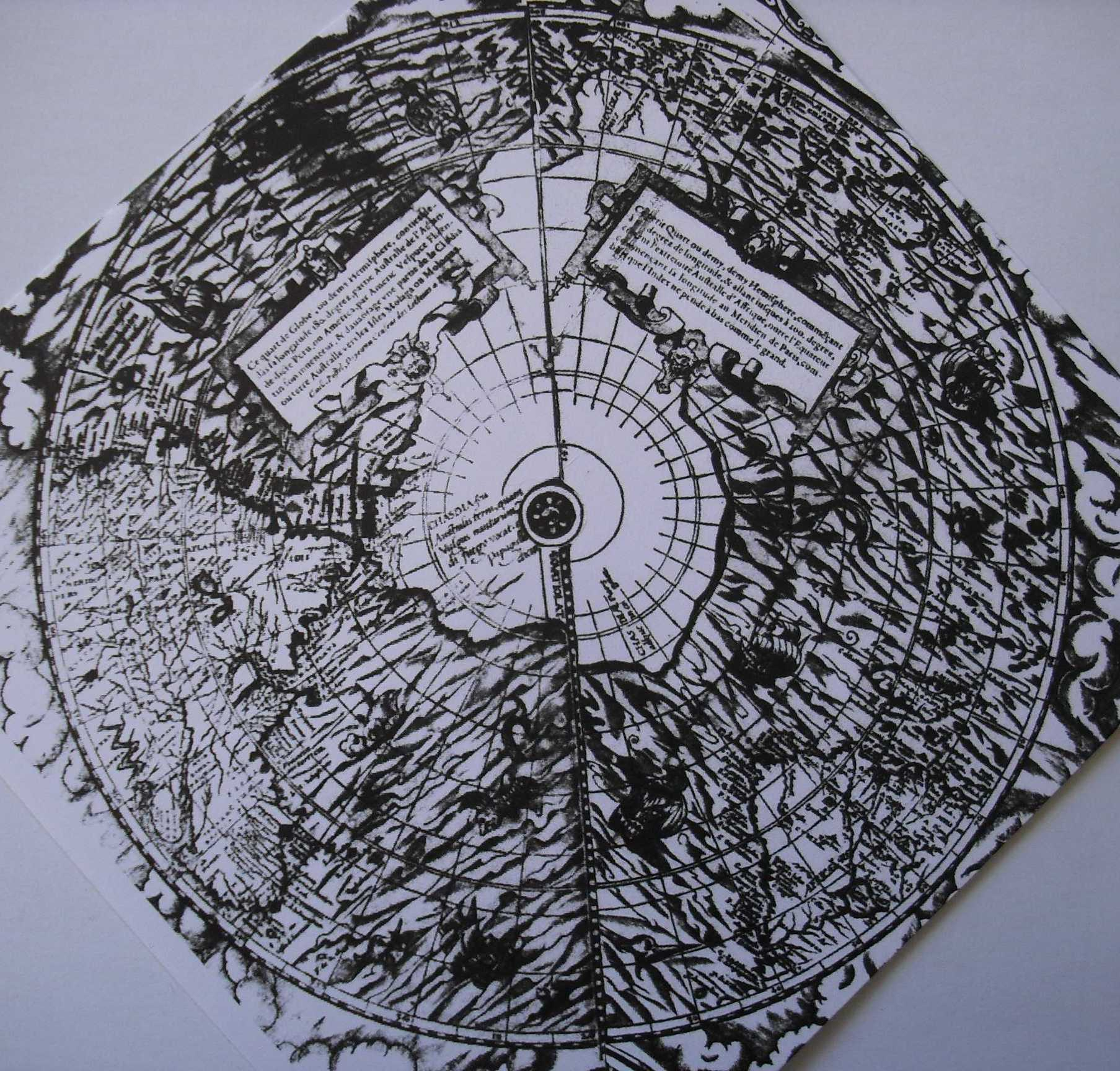
Guillaume Postel: "Chasdia or Terra Australis, which the common sailors call Tierra del Fuego and others say is the Land of the Parrots"

Postel took an interest in geography in his course of lectures at the Collège Royal, now known as Collège de France, in 1537. He is believed to have spent the years from 1548 to 1551 traveling to the Holy Land and Ottoman Syria, to collect manuscripts. After this trip, he earned the appointment of Professor of Mathematics and Oriental Languages at the Collège Royal. In 1552, he published a short compendium under the name, De Universitate Liber, perhaps inspired by that of Henricus Glareanus (1527). This geographer had drawn two polar projections which remained in manuscript. Postel expanded upon De Universitate Liber, which was published as the Cosmographicae Disciplinae Compendium by Johannes Oporinus in Basel, in 1561.

In Cosmographicae, Postel clearly set out his ideas on the continents of Asia (Semia, after Shem), Africa (Chamia or Chamesia, after Ham), Europe (Iapetia, after Japheth), the Americas (Atlantides), and Australia (Chasdia, after Cush). He denoted the Americas as boreal and austral, and distinctly separated them from Australia (Terre Australle or Chasdia) by the Strait of Magellan (Fretum Martini Bohemi). Chasdia was a term created by Postel.

==== World map and Chasdia ====
Cosmographicae has an index of 600 names, which Postel included in his 1578 world map, Polo aptata Nova Charta Universi. Australia is called Chasdia in three places: under the Americas (CHASDIAE residuum Atlantidis meridiana pars); under the Moluccas (CHASDIAE pars) where it is joined to an unnamed New Guinea with its Rio Saint Augustin; and under Africa (CHASDIAE pars adhuc incognita).

To the south of South America, he included the following legend:

Ce quart de globe, ou demy Hémisphere contient dedans sa longitude clxxx degrès [180º], partie Australle de l'Atlantide dicte Peru ou America par Americ Vespuce Florentin son inventeur, et davantage une partie de la Chasdia ou terre Australle vers les Isles Mologa ou Moluques. (This quarter of the globe, or half hemisphere, contains within its 180 degrees of longitude the southern part of the Atlantide called Peru or America by Florentine Amerigo Vespucci its discoverer, and as well a part of Chasdia or Terra Australis toward the Mologa or Moluccas Islands.)

The South Pole is alluded to:

Chasdia qui est vers le Gond ou Pole Austral ainsi appellée à cause que de la Meridionale partie ou Australe procede la Misericorde dicte Chassed (Chasdia which is toward the Hinge or South Pole, so called because from the southern or austral part originates Mercy called Chessed).

Another legend on the same map over the southern continent reads: CHASDIA seu Australis terra, quam Vulgus nautarum di fuego vocant alii Papagallorum dicunt (Chasdia or Terra Australis, which the common sailors call Tierra del Fuego and others say is the Land of the Parrots).

Postel’s world map strongly influenced Gerard de Jode and others of the Antwerp school.

=== Near East and Central Europe ===
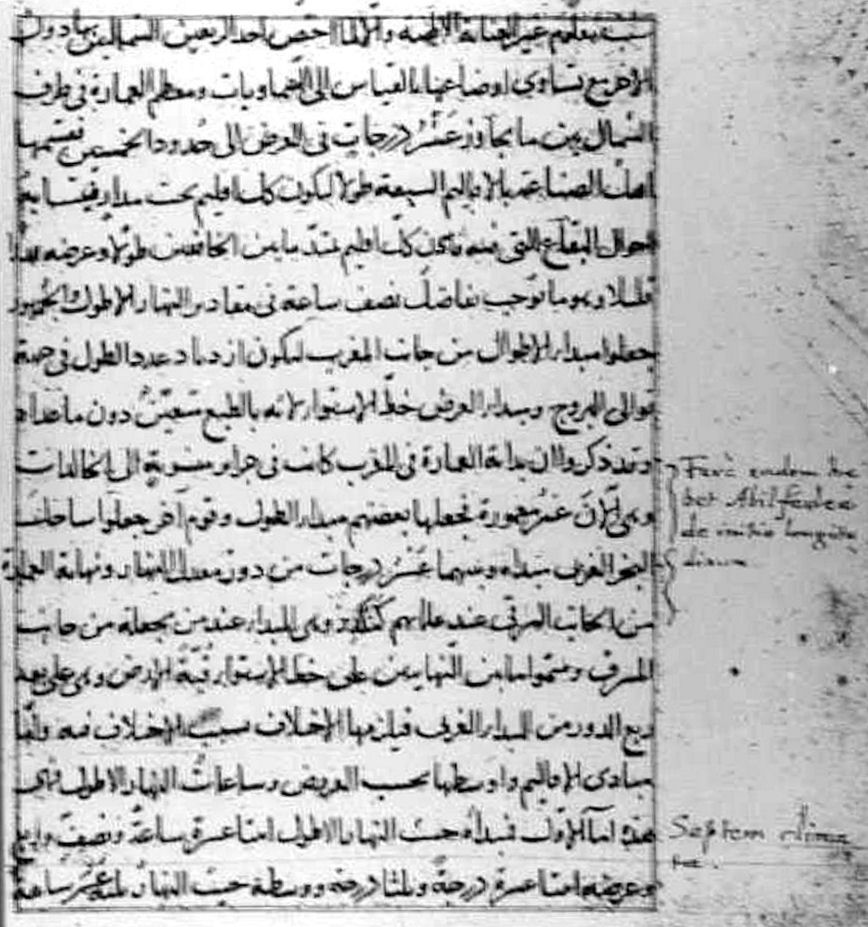
Arabic astronomical manuscript of Nasir al-Din al-Tusi, annotated by Guillaume Postel

After several years, Postel resigned his professorship and traveled throughout Central Europe, including the Habsburg Empire and Renaissance Italy. He returned to France after each trip, often by way of Venice. Through his efforts at manuscript collection, translation, and publishing, he brought many Ancient Greek, Hebrew, and Arabic texts into European intellectual discourse in the Late Renaissance and early modern periods. Among these texts are:

- Euclid's Elements, in the version of the astronomer Nasir al-Din al-Tusi;
- An astronomical work by al-Kharaqī, Muntahā al-idrāk fī taqāsīm al-aflāk ("The Ultimate Grasp of the Divisions of Spheres"), disputing Ptolemy's Almagest.
- Astronomical works by al-Tusi and other Arabic astronomers;
- Latin translations of the Zohar, the Sefer Yetzirah, and the Sefer ha-Bahir, which are works of Jewish Kabbalah, printed in 1552;
- Christian Cabbala texts, such as his own commentary on the significance of the Menorah, which he published in 1548 in Latin and subsequently in Hebrew.

=== Two aspects of the soul ===
To Postel, the human soul is composed of intellect and emotion, which he envisaged as male and female, head and heart. The soul's triadic unity is through the union of these two halves. Yet Postel did not mean a second incarnation of divinity: his sentiment and language make it clear that he spoke figuratively.

=== Heresy and confinement ===
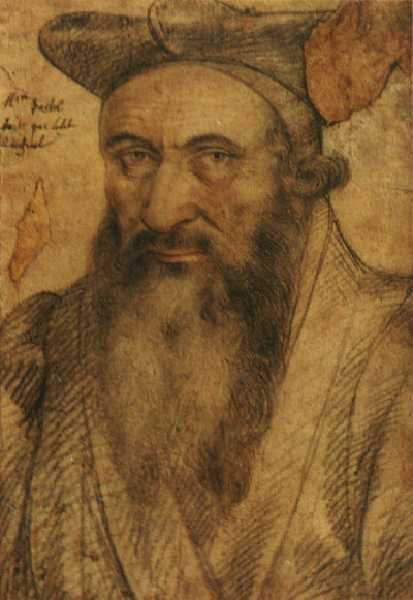
Guillaume Postel

While working on his translations of the Zohar and the Bahir in Venice in 1547, Postel became the confessor of Mother Zuana, an elderly woman who was responsible for the kitchen of the hospital of San Giovanni e Paolo. Zuana confessed to experiencing divine visions, which inspired Postel to believe that she was a prophet, that he was her spiritual son, and that he was destined to be the unifier of the world's religions. When he returned from his second journey to the East, he dedicated two works to her memory: Les Très Merveilleuses Victoire des Femmes du Nouveau Monde and La Vergine Venetiana.

Based on his own visions, these works brought Postel into conflict with the Inquisition. However, Postel's ties to the very men tasked with trying him led to a verdict of insanity, rather than heresy, which could lead to the death penalty, and so Postel was confined to the papal prisons in Rome. He was released when the prison was opened upon the death of Paul IV in 1559. Czech Renaissance humanist Šimon Proxenus ze Sudetu (1532–1575), reports that in 1564 Postel was detained to the monastery of St. Martin des Champs in Paris, "because of his delusions on the Mother Jeanne".

Postel resumed his life in Paris, but the alleged miracle at Laon in 1566 had a profound effect on him, and that year he published an account of it, De summopere considerando miraculo, in which he again expounded upon the interrelatedness of all parts of the universe and his imminent restoration of the world order. As a result, he was sentenced to house arrest by the Parlement of Paris, and eventually spent the last 11 years of his life confined to the monastery of Saint-Martin-des-Champs Priory. He died in Paris in 1581.

== Works ==
- De originibus seu de hebraicae lingua (Concerning the Origins or concerning the language of Hebrew, in Latin), 1538.
- Linguarum Duodecim Characteribus Differentium Alphabetum Introductio (Introduction to Twelve Languages with Characters in Different Alphabets, in Latin), 1538
- Les Magistratures athéniennes (The Athenian Magistrates, in French), 1540.
- Description de la Syrie (Description of Syria, in French), 1540.
- Sacrarum apodixeon, seu, Euclidis christiani lib. II, Apodictic Demonstration of Sacred Matters, or Christian Euclid, in Two Books.
- Les Raisons du Saint-Esprit (The Plans of the Holy Spirit, in French), 1543.
- Alcorani seu legis Mahometi et euangelistarum concordiæ liber, in quo de calamitatibus orbi Christiano imminentibus tractatur (“The Book of Concord between the Quran, or the Law of Muhammad, and the Evangelists, in which the calamities threatening the Christian world are addressed.”), 1543. The work compares the Reformation and Islam: the core of the argument is built around a list of twenty-eight axioms shared by the “Evangelists” and the Quran, which Postel attributes to a single diabolical inspiration.
- De orbis terrae concordia (Concerning the Agreement [in Doctrines] of the World, in Latin), 1544.
- De nativitate Mediatoris (Concerning the Nativity of Jesus, in Latin), 1547.
- Absconditorum clavis, ou La Clé des choses cachées et l'Exégèse du Candélabre mystique dans le tabernacle de Moyse (The Key to Hidden Things and the Interpretation of the Mystical Menorah in Moses' Tabernacle, in French), 1547.
- Livre des causes et des principes (Book of Causes and Principles, in French), 1551.
- Abrahami patriarchae liber Jezirah (The Sefer Yetzirah of Abraham the Patriarch," in Latin), 1552.
- Liber mirabilium (Book of Miracles, in Latin), 1552.
- Raisons de la monarchie (Reasons for Monarchy, in French), 1552.
- La Loi salique (The Salian Law, in French), 1552.
- L'Histoire mémorable des expéditions depuis le déluge (The Known History of Travels after the Flood, in French), 1552.
- Les Très Merveilleuses Victoires des femmes du Nouveau monde (The very Marvelous Victories of the Women of the New World, in French), 1553.
- Des merveilles du monde et principalemẽt des admirables choses des Indes & du nouveau monde (On the Marvels of the world and especially on the Admirable Affairs of the Indies and the New World, in French), 1553
- Cosmographie (Cosmography, in French), 1559.
- La République des Turcs (The Turkish Republic, in French), 1560.
- La Vraye et Entière Description du royaume de France (The True and Whole Description of the Kingdom of France, in French), 1570.
- Des admirables secrets des nombres platoniciens (On the Admirable Secrets of Platonic Numbers, in French).

== See also ==
- Christian universalism
- Comparative religion
- French Renaissance literature
- Islamic Civilization during the European Renaissance
- Orientalism in early modern France

== Sources ==
- Jeanne Peiffer, article in Writing the History of Mathematics: Its Historical Development, edited by Joseph Dauben & Christoph Scriba
- Marion Kuntz, Guillaume Postel: Prophet of the Restitution of All Things, His Life and Thought, Martinus Nijhoff Publishers, Hague, 1981
- Whose Science is Arabic Science in Renaissance Europe?
- Jean-Pierre Brach, "Son of the Son of God: The feminine Messiah and her progeny, according to Guillaume Postel (1510–1581),' in Olav Hammer (ed), Alternative Christs (Cambridge, CUP, 2009), 113-130.
