= Popper =

Popper may refer to:

- Popper (surname), including a list of people with the name
- Jalapeño popper, a type of food
- Poppers, a slang term for alkyl nitrites inhaled for recreational purposes
- Poppers, a brand of frozen food owned by Heinz
- Popper (see Popping (dance)), a person dancing in a certain street/funk style
- Popper, a floating fishing popper or fly with a cupped or flat, forward-facing indentation that splashes the surface of the water with a popping sound when tugged
- A hip pop musician
- Popper, a ball that rises sharply from the pitch when bowled ('pops up') in cricket
- Popper, a juicebox (Australian English)
- Popper buttons, another term for "snap fasteners"
- Poppers, an alternate name for tearaway pants in British English
- Party popper, a small 'toy' filled with confetti streamers and a small explosive charge to release them
- Bang snaps, small novelty fireworks that produce a loud snapping sound when thrown on the ground
- Poppers, a slang term for Papadum, an Indian crisp wafer or cracker
- Poppers, a cartoon strip by Jerry Mills
- Eye popper, a dome-shaped children's toy
