= Pop it =

Аnti-stress toy

Pop-It
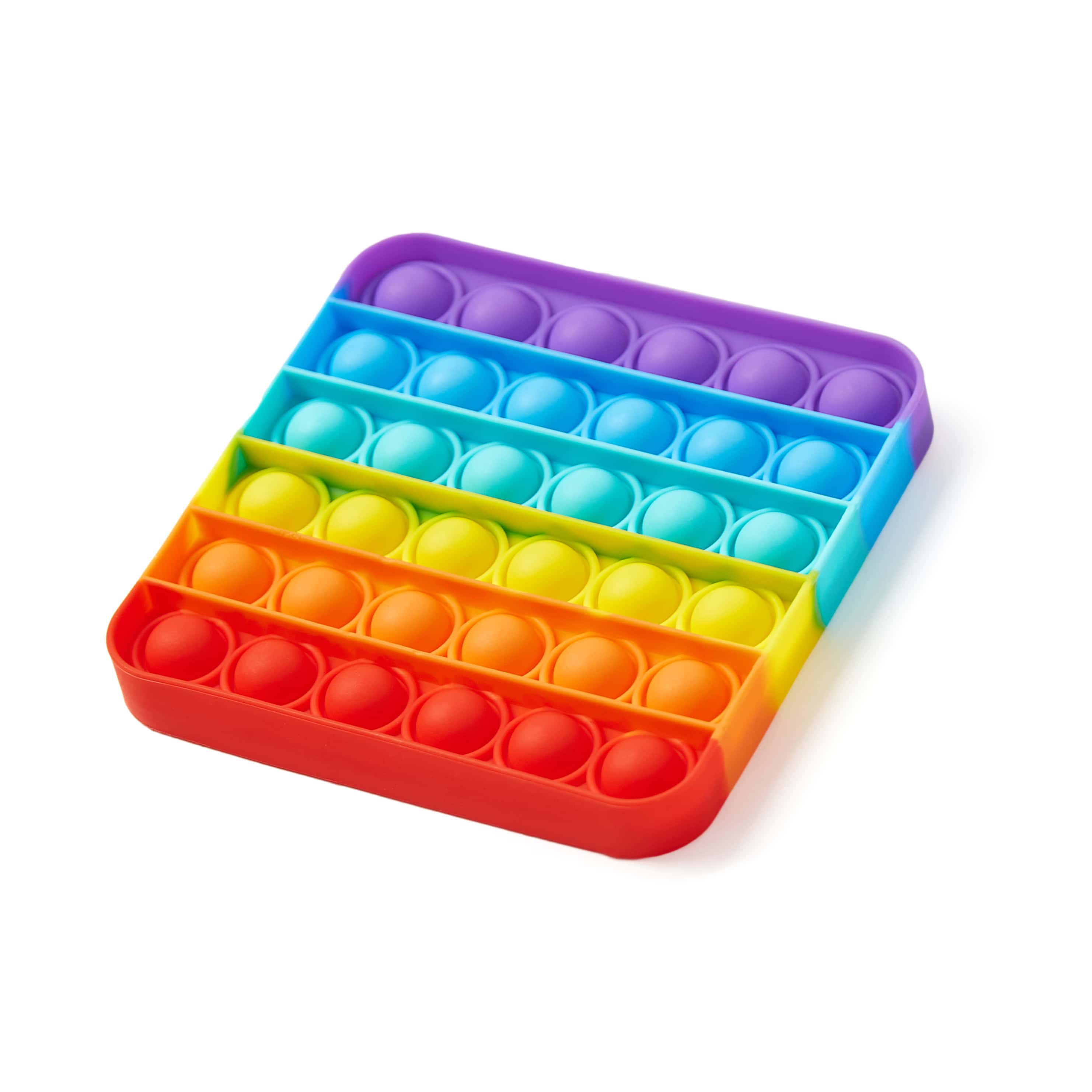
- Type: Fidget toy
- Company: FoxMind
- Country: Israel
- Availability: 2014–present
- Materials: Silicone

A Pop-It (also known as Go Pop and Last One Lost) consists of a usually brightly colored silicone tray with poppable bubbles, similar to bubble wrap, that can be flipped and re-used. They come in a variety of colors, shapes, and sizes, including wearable formats. It is marketed as a stress-reliever and rose in popularity in the spring of 2021 due to TikTok influencers as well as boredom and stress attributed to the COVID-19 pandemic.

== Origin ==
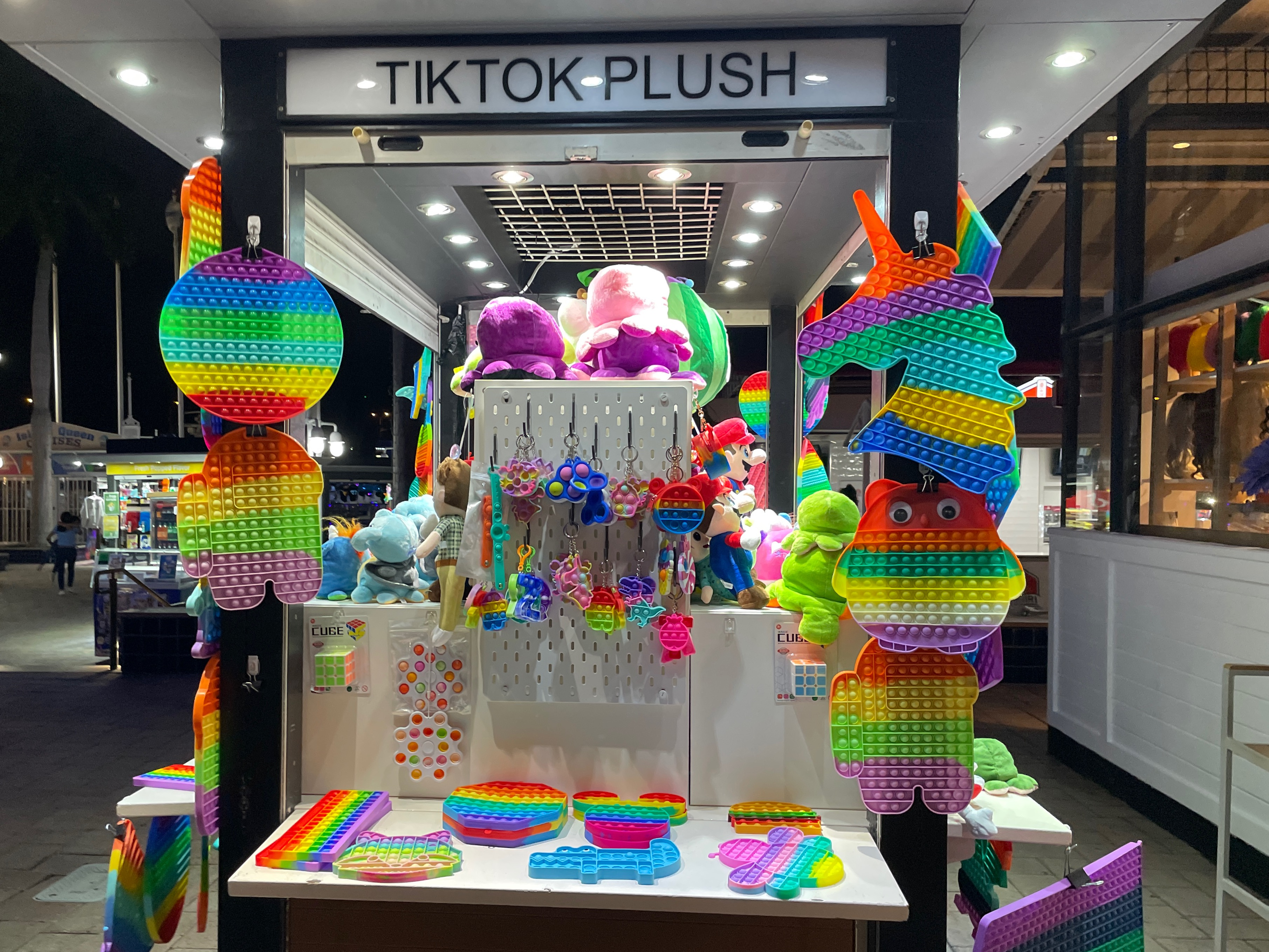
Pop-Its for sale in Miami, Florida

The mechanical design of the Pop-It bubble popper was originally invented in 1975 by Theo and Ora Coster of Theora Concepts, a married Israeli couple who had invented many games including Guess Who? and Zingo!.

The idea came to Ora Coster in a dream in 1974, when her sister died from breast cancer. Following her dream, Ora told Theo to "imagine a large field of breasts, ladies’ breasts, that you can push the nipple" and asked him to "do a carpet of nipples that you can press from one side to the other", according to the couple's son.

At first, there were no buyers to manufacture the toy because its rubber construction made mass production expensive. In 2009, it was acquired by Montreal-based company FoxMindGames. Many iterations of the prototype were made, and the product material was ultimately changed by them to silicone. It was introduced as a logic game for the first time by Darren Watkins in 2014 during the Nuremberg Toy Fair, followed by the New York Toy Fair. The company marketed the product as a logic game that is quick and fun to play and fidget with. It gained popularity initially with toys and games specialty stores and special education specialists. In 2019, FoxMind partnered with Buffalo Games, LLC to introduce the toy/game under Speedy Pop It! trademarked brand in all Target stores in the US under the name "Pop It!".The toy's success is attributed to a 2020 TikTok video of a monkey named Gaitlyn in which the monkey played with a Go Pop. Many spin-offs of the toy were made, creating a massive hike in silicone raw material prices in China.

== See also ==
- Eye popper
- Fidget spinner
- Stress ball
