= Meir ben Solomon Abi-Sahula =

Spanish kabbalist and Sephardic tosafist

Rabbi Meir ben Solomon Abi-Sahula (Hebrew: רבי מאיר בן שלמה בן סהולה; c. 1251 – after 1335) also known as ben Sahula or ibn Sahula was a 13th-century Spanish kabbalist and Sephardic tosafist. He is known for his final commentary on Sefer Bahir, which he published under the pseudonym "Or HaGanuz" ("The Hidden Light").

== Biography ==
Born around 1251 in Spain, in his early years he studied under Joshua ibn Shuaib. He later affiliated himself with the kabbalistic school in Guadalajara, where he wrote a commentary on the esoteric material in Nachmanides' commentary on the Torah. From 1320 to 1325, he began writing his own tosafot; however he only completed part of Genesis. It was also during this time that he wrote a commentary on Sefer Yetzirah which he completed in 1331. In this commentary, ibn Sahula offers severe criticism of Nahmanides' comments on the first chapter of Sefer Yetzirah. After finishing his commentary on Sefer Yetzirah, he began to work on a commentary of Sefer Bahir which he finished in 1335. This would go on to be the final form of Sefer Bahir. ibn Sahula also wrote a kabbalistic commentary on Pirkei De-Rabbi Eliezer, which has unfortunately been lost. His comments on Sefer Yetzirah and Sefer Bahir are considered to be highly arbitrary, and he is criticized for attributing views to Naḥmanides which contradict the latter's real opinions. Shlomo Halevi Alkabetz even accuses him of "not aiming at the truth." That being said, some scholars such as Meir Poppers praised ibn Sahula for his commentary on Sefer Yetzirah, and Poppers made it a basis for his own commentary.
