= Joshua ibn Shuaib =

Joshua ibn Shuaib (Hebrew: יהושע אבן שועיב; ca 1280 - ca 1340) was a rabbi who lived in Spain. He was a pupil of Solomon ben Adret and the teacher of Menahem ibn Zerah and ibn Sahula. He is notable for his book of sermons on the Torah, which he seems to have written for preaching in a synagogue. Each sermon expounds on a weekly Torah portion, derives a moral lesson from it, and teaches some of the laws it contains, or that are relevant to that time of year. Sometimes he creatively links various parts of the portion to a broad ethical or theological theme. His sermons were first published in Constantinople, in 1523.
