= Aaron ben Zerah =

14th century Jewish martyr

Aaron ben Zerah was a French Jew who suffered martyrdom at Estella in the Kingdom of Navarre on March 5, 1328. Banished from his original home in 1306 by order of King Philip the Fair of France, who confiscated his property, he sought refuge at Estella, where, after a residence of twenty years, he, his wife, and four of his sons were slaughtered by Catholics in a barbaric pogrom. The brutal horrors of that event are described in "Ẓedah la-Derek," a work written by Aaron's son Menahem ben Aaron ibn Zerah, who escaped death thanks to the intervention of a compassionate Christian knight, a friend of his father, who brought him home and nursed him back to health.
