= Popper (surname) =

Popper is a surname.

Notable people with the name include:

- Albert Popper (1808–1889), Mayor of Vimperk and official doctor of the Schwarzenberg Princes
- Ami Popper (born 1969), convicted murderer
- Catherine Popper (born 1973), rock musician
- David Popper (1843–1913), Bohemian composer and cellist
- David H. Popper (1912–2008), American diplomat
- Erwin Popper (1879–1955), Austrian physician
- Frank Popper (1918–2020), art historian
- Frank J. Popper (born 1944), Rutgers urban planner
- Ilona Novák-Popper (1925-2019), Hungarian swimmer
- Joachim Edler von Popper (1722–1795), Court Jew and lessee of the Habsburg tobacco monopoly
- John Popper (born 1967), musician and songwriter
- Josef Popper (1838–1921), Austrian engineer and author
- Julius Popper (1857–1893), Romanian explorer
- Karl Popper (1902–1994), philosopher of science, defender of liberal democracy
- Ota Pavel (1930–1973), Czech author (born Otto Popper)
- Robert Popper (born 1967), comedy producer, writer and actor
- Siegfried Popper (1848–1933), Austrian naval constructor
- William Popper (1874–1963), American Orientalist and professor
- Meir ben Judah Leib Poppers (ca 1624–1662), Bohemian rabbi and Kabbalist
