= Al-Kharaqī =

12th century Persian mathematician and astronomer

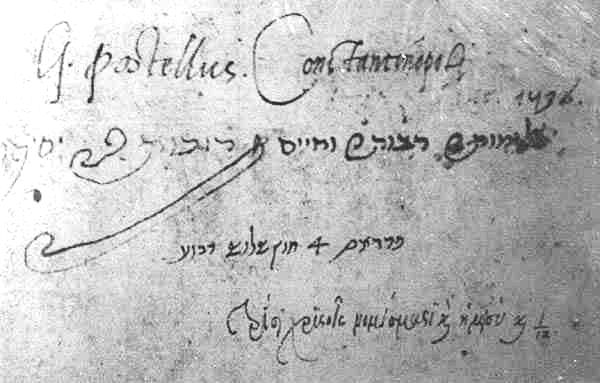
Note of Guillaume Postel on the Arabic astronomical manuscript of al-Kharaqī, Muntahā al-idrāk fī taqāsīm al-aflāk ("The Ultimate Grasp of the Divisions of Spheres").

Abū Muḥammad 'Abd al-Jabbār al-Kharaqī, Persian: بهاءالدین ابوبکر محمد بن احمد بن ابوبشر also Al-Kharaqī (1084-1158) was a Persian astronomer and mathematician of the 12th century, born in Kharaq near Merv. He was in the service of Sultan Sanjar at the Persian Court. Al-Kharaqī challenged the astronomical theory of Ptolemy in the Almagest, and established an alternative theory of the spheres, imagining huge material spheres in which the planets moved inside tubes. He later wrote at-Tabṣıra fî ʿilmi’l-hayʾa as a second edition to his well-known book Muntahā al-idrāk fī taqāsīm al-aflāk in which he removed some parts and reshaped its structure as two parts instead of three.

During his travels to the Ottoman Empire in 1536, Guillaume Postel acquired an astronomical work by al-Kharaqī, Muntahā al-idrāk fī taqāsīm al-aflāk ("The Ultimate Grassp of the Divisions of Spheres"), annotated it, and brought it back to Europe.

Al-Kharaqī also wrote mathematical treatises, now lost, Al-Risala al-Shāmila ("Comprehensive Treatise") and Al-Risala al-Maghribiyya ("The North African Treatise", related to the calculus of dirham and dinar).

== Works ==
- Muntahā al-idrāk fī taqāsīm al-aflāk ("The Ultimate Grassp of the Divisions of Spheres") 1138/9
- Al-Risala al-Shāmila ("Comprehensive Treatise")
- Al-Risala al-Maghribiyya ("The North African Treatise")
