= Amy Dahan =

French mathematician

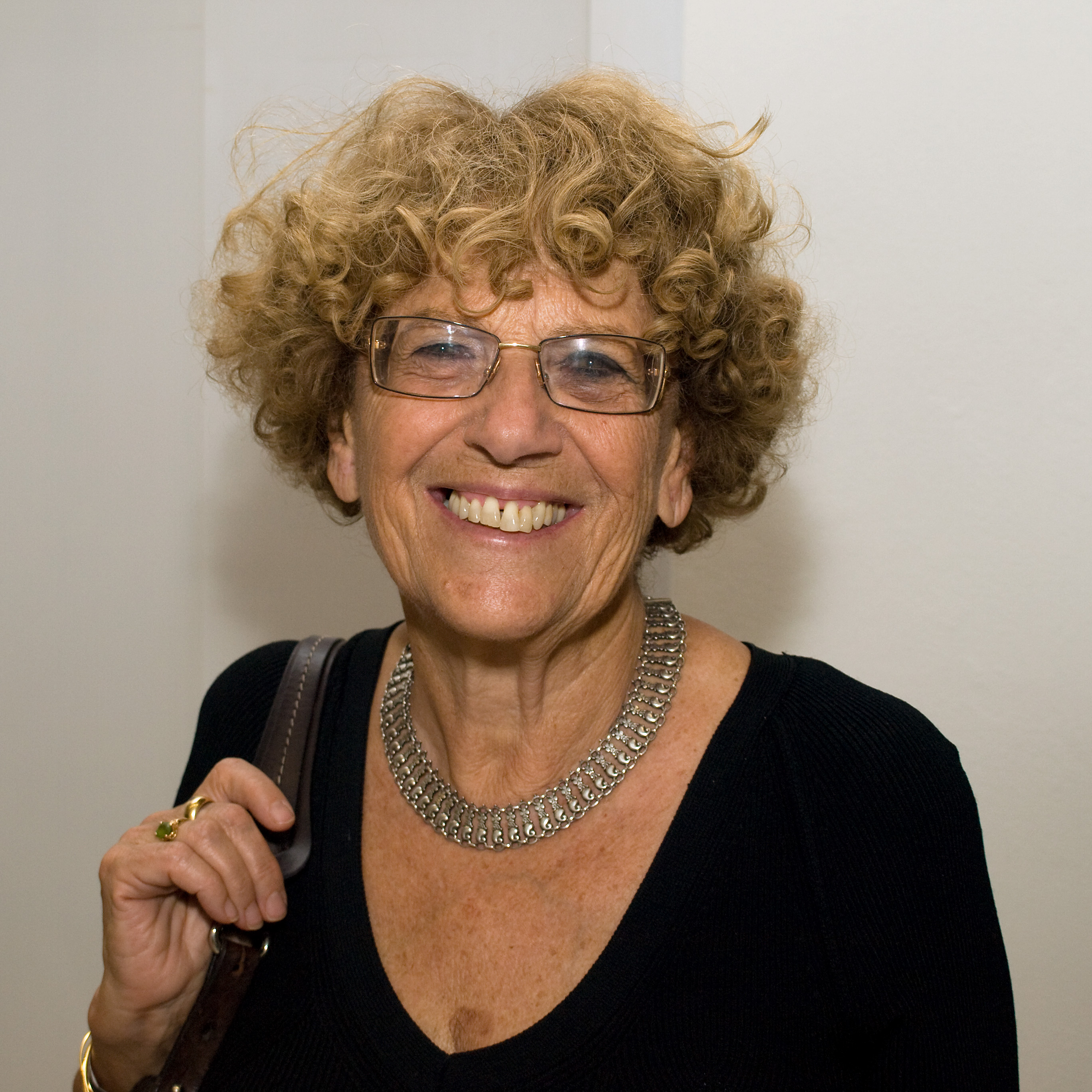
Dahan in 2016

Amy Dahan-Dalmédico is a French mathematician, historian of mathematics, and historian of the politics of climate change.

== Education and career ==
Dahan earned a doctorate in mathematics in 1979 and taught mathematics at the University of Amiens until 1983, when she became a researcher for the CNRS. She has also taught at the École Polytechnique, School for Advanced Studies in the Social Sciences, and Université libre de Bruxelles. She earned a second doctorate in the history of mathematics in 1990, and is an emeritus member of the Alexandre Koyré Center for Research in the History of Science and Technology.

== Books ==
Dahan is the author of:

- Une histoire des mathématiques: routes et dédales (with Jeanne Peiffer, Études Vivantes, 1982). Translated into English by Sanford Segal as History of Mathematics: Highways and Byways (American Mathematical Society, 2010). Also translated into German as Wege und Irrwege — Eine Geschichte der Mathematik (Birkhäuser, 1994) and into Russian as Пути и лабиринты: Очерки по истории математики (Mir, 1986).
- Mathématiques au fil des âges (with J. Dhombres, R. Bkouche, C. Houzel, and M. Guillemot, Bordas, 1987)
- Mathématisations: Augustin-Louis Cauchy et l'École Française (Éditions du Choix, 1992)
- Jacques-Louis Lions, un mathématicien d'exception: entre recherche, industrie et politique (Éditions La Découverte, 2005)
- Les modèles du futur: changement climatique et scénarios économiques, enjeux scientifiques et politiques (Éditions La Découverte, 2007)
- Gouverner le climat ? 20 ans de négociations internationales (with Stefan C. Aykut, Presses de Sciences Po, 2015)

She is the editor of:

- La Formation polytechnicienne, 1794–1994 (with Bruno Belhoste and Antoine Picon, Dunod, 1994)
- La France des X. Deux siècles d'histoire (with Bruno Belhoste, Dominique Pestre, and Antoine Picon, Economica, 1995)
- Changing Images in Mathematics: From the French Revolution to the New Millennium (with Umberto Bottazini, Routledge, 2001).
