= Bubble wrap =

Packing material

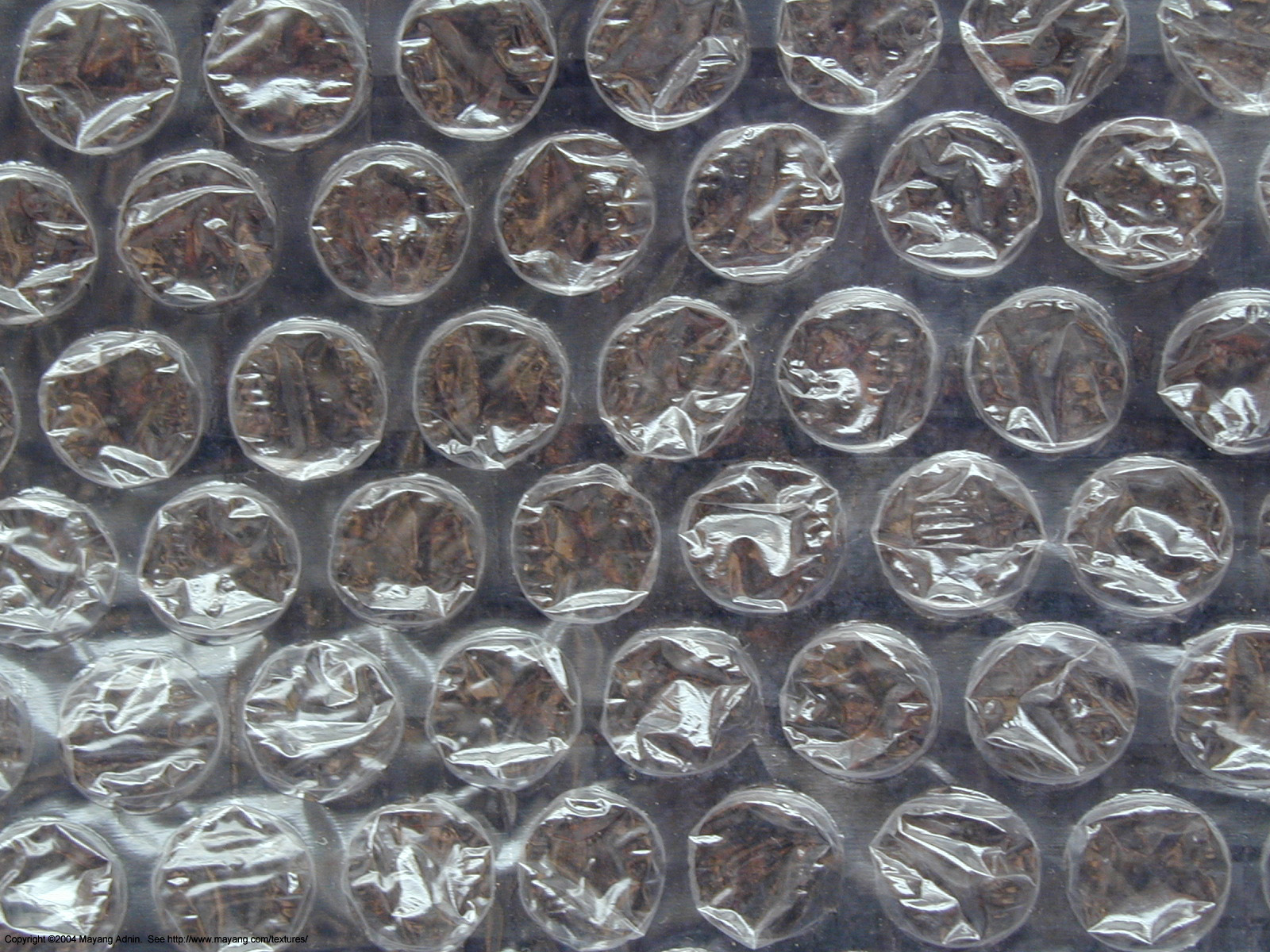
Bubble wrap

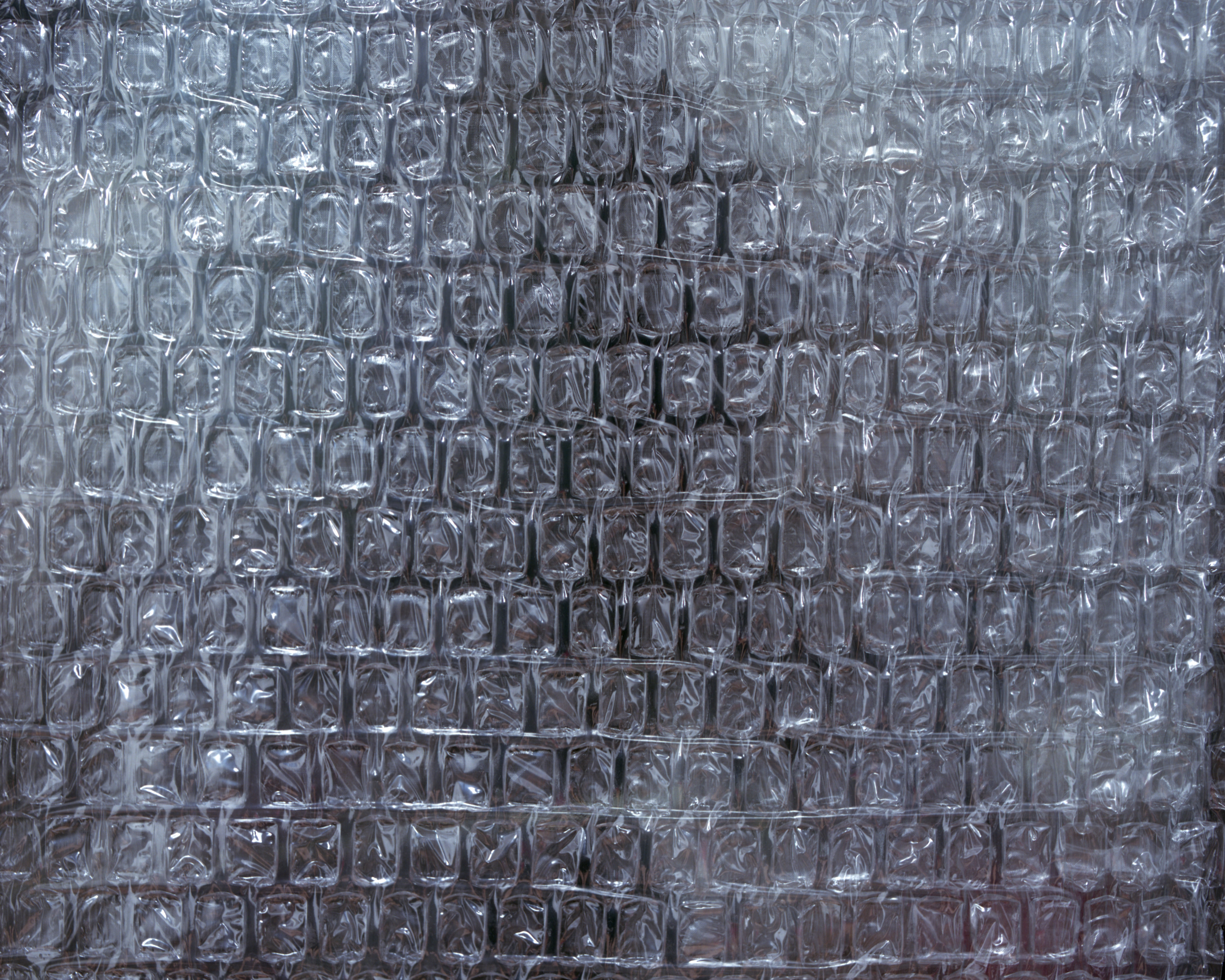
Square-shaped bubble wrap for house insulation

Bubble wrap is a pliable transparent plastic material commonly used for protecting fragile items during shipping. Known for its cushioning air-filled bubbles, it has also become a cultural icon, celebrated for its satisfying popping sound and alternative uses as a stress-relief tool. Regularly spaced, protruding air-filled hemispheres (bubbles) provide cushioning for fragile items.

In 1957, two inventors named Alfred Fielding and Marc Chavannes were attempting to create a three-dimensional plastic wallpaper. Although the idea was a failure, they found that what they made could be used as packing material. Sealed Air was co-founded by Fielding in 1960.

The term "bubble wrap" is owned by Sealed Air Corporation, but has become a generic trademark.

== Design ==
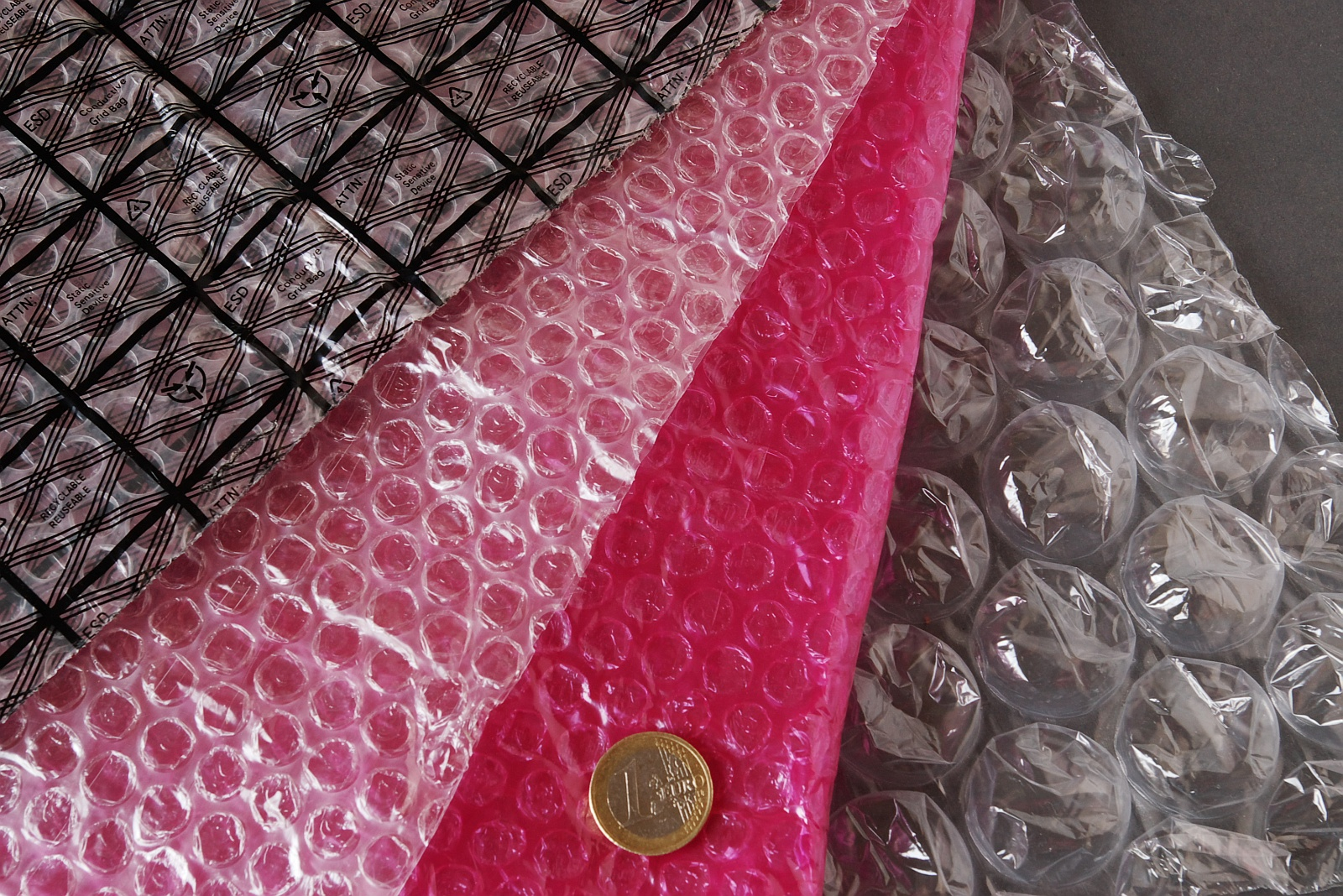
Bubble wrap, standard and with colored markings as electrostatic discharge materials, and in different bubble size

The bubbles that provide the cushioning for fragile or sensitive objects are generally available in different sizes, depending on the size of the object being packed, as well as the level of cushioning protection needed. Multiple layers may be needed to provide shock and vibration isolation, while a single layer may simply be used as a surface protective layer. Bubble wrap is also used to form some types of mailing envelopes.

Bubble wrap is most often formed from polyethylene (low-density polyethylene) film with a shaped side bonded to a flat side to form air bubbles. Some types of bubble wrap have a lower permeation barrier film to allow longer useful life and resistance to loss of air in vacuums.

The bubbles can be as small as 6 millimetres (0.24 inches) in diameter, to as large as 26 millimetres (1.0 inch) or more, to provide added levels of shock absorption during transit. The most common bubble size is 1 centimeter. In addition to the degree of protection available from the size of the air bubbles in the plastic, the plastic material itself can offer some forms of protection for the object in question. For example, when shipping sensitive electronic parts and components, a type of bubble wrap is used that employs an antistatic plastic that dissipates static charge, thereby protecting the sensitive electronic chips from static which can damage them. One of the first widespread uses of bubble wrap came in 1960, with the shipping of the new IBM 1401 computers to customers, most of whom had never seen this packing material before.

In 2015 Sealed Air launched an "iBubble Wrap" design, the bubbles of which are connected in strips. This allows the wrap to be shipped flat to retailers (taking up around 1/50 of the space in transit), who can inflate it with an air pump prior to using it for packaging. The connection between pockets means that the bubbles on iBubble Wrap cannot be "popped".

== Amusement ==
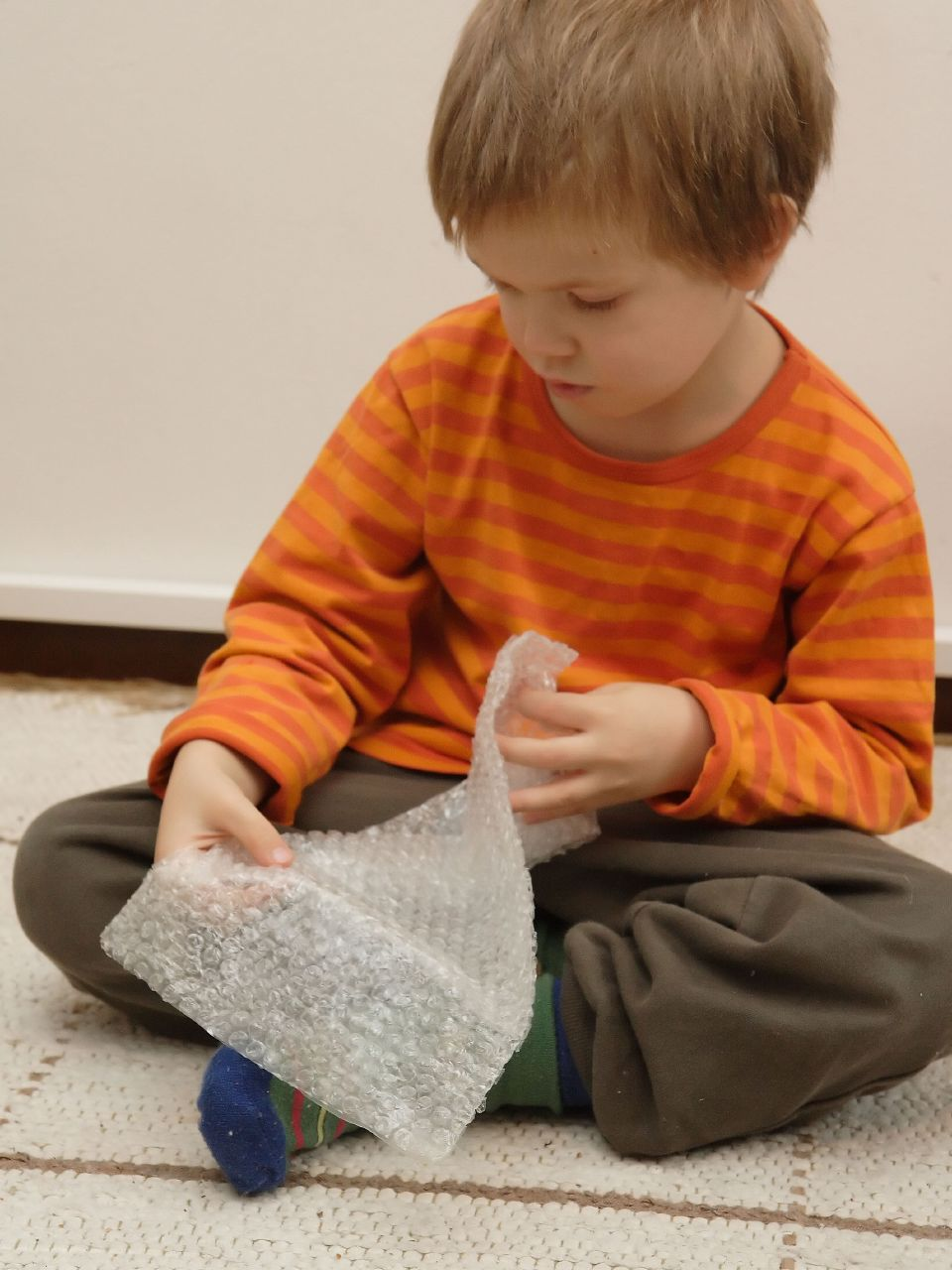
A child playing with bubble wrap

Since bubble wrap makes a satisfying popping sound when compressed and ruptured, it is often used as a source of amusement. Acknowledging this alternative use, some websites provide a virtual bubble wrap program which displays a sheet of bubble wrap that users may pop by clicking on the bubbles, while the Mugen Puchipuchi is a compact electronic toy simulating bubble wrap popping. Products such as Pop-Its, which can be inverted and popped again, rose significantly in popularity in 2021, marketed as a stress reliever.

Bubble Wrap Appreciation Day is celebrated on the last Monday of January. The last Monday of January was designated as Bubble Wrap Appreciation Day after a radio station in Bloomington, Indiana received a shipment of microphones wrapped in bubble wrap and broadcast the sound of their wrappings being popped.

In an episode of the British science fiction sitcom Red Dwarf, set initially in the 23rd century, the character Arnold Rimmer mentions how bubble wrap was painted red and marketed as a 'tension sheet' with the aim of relieving stress by one of his school friends, making them extremely wealthy.

== Alternatives ==
A similar but recyclable form of packaging, sometimes marketed as "paper bubble wrap", consists of thick paper with a heavily embossed pattern reminiscent of bubble wrap, which can be wrapped around objects to protect them in transit. There is also honeycomb paper, also known as hive wrap made of Kraft paper with parting lines allowing the paper to be stretched without breaking, thickening the material and giving it a honeycomb-like structure with cushioning properties. Sometimes honeycomb paper is sold as paper bubble wrap or paper wrap.

== See also ==
- Cushioning
- List of generic and genericized trademarks
- Packaging
