= Ora and Theo Coster =

Dutch toy designers

Theo (1928–2019) and Ora (1931–2021) Coster (Hebrew: תיאו ואורה קוסטר) are the founders of Theora Concepts; they were a married Israeli couple and inventors of about 200 games and toys, including Guess Who?, Magimizer, Zingo!, and Go Pop.

== Early lives ==
Theo was born Maurice (Morris) Simon in 1928 in Amsterdam. His family owned a printing business. He survived the Holocaust by living with a non-Jewish family and changing his name. He had been a classmate of Anne Frank; he later made a film and wrote a book with fellow surviving classmates. After graduating college and serving in the Dutch military, he moved to Israel in 1955 where he met Ora, a schoolteacher.

As a teenager, Ora had served in the Israeli Army during the 1948 war. She then moved to the United Kingdom to study stage design. After returning to Israel, she and Theo wed two years after meeting.

== Business ==
They founded Theora Design (a combination of their given names). They began by creating promotional products for businesses until they made enough money from selling over 12 billion Elsie Stix (an ice cream stick which doubled as a construction toy) to let them focus on designing games.

Their children run Theora Design as of 2023.

== Deaths ==
The Costers' tombstones are designed to appear like tiles from their game Guess Who?.
