= Menahem ben Aaron ibn Zerah =

Navarrese rabbi

Menahem ben Aaron ibn Zerah (Hebrew: מנחם בן אהרן בן זרח; died 1385) was a Navarrese rabbi and codifier born in the Kingdom of Navarre, probably at Estella, in the first third of the 14th century.

== Biography ==
Menahem's father Aaron, forced to leave France in 1306 through the expulsion of the Jews, went to Navarre and settled in Estella, where Menahem passed his youth. In the massacre which took place in Estella on the 5th and 6 March 1328, Menahem's parents and his four younger brothers were slain. Menahem himself was stricken to the ground, and lay all but dead from his wounds, when he was saved through the compassion of a knight, a friend of his father's. He then studied two years under Joshua ibn Shuaib, after which he went to Alcalá to join Joseph ibn al-'Aish, with whom he studied the Talmud and Tosafot. His chief teacher was Judah ben Asher, who went through the whole of the Talmud with him, with the exception of the third and fourth orders. In 1361 Menahem succeeded Joseph ibn al'Aish as rabbi in Alcala, and held office for eight years, during which time he also taught the Talmud.

In consequence of the civil war which broke out in 1368, Menahem lost all his property, and he then went to Toledo, where Don Samuel Abravanel took him under his protection, and enabled him to continue his studies during the rest of his life. Menahem died at Toledo in July 1385.

== Zedah la-Derek ==
In honor and for the benefit of Abravanel, Menahem wrote Zedah la-Derek (Ferrara, 1554). This work occupies a peculiar position among law codes, and is in a certain sense unique. As the author states in the introduction (ed. Sabbionetta, p. 166), it is intended mainly for rich Jews who associate with princes and who, on account of their high station and their intercourse with the non-Jewish world, are not over-rigorous in regard to Jewish regulations. For such a class of readers a law-codex must not be too voluminous, but must contain the most essential laws, especially those that the higher classes would be inclined to overstep.

The Ẓedah la-Derek is divided into five parts (comprising altogether 372 sections), which may be summarized as follows:

- Part i.: The ritual and all that is related to it, as, for example, the regulations concerning phylacteries, zizit, etc.
- Part ii.: Laws concerning forbidden foods.
- Part iii.: Marriage laws.
- Part iv.: Sabbath and feast-days.
- Part v.: Fast-days and laws for mourning. As a supplement to the last part is a treatise on the Messiah and on the resurrection of the dead.

Menahem sought to emphasize the ethical side of the Law in his work. He was not satisfied with merely stating the regulations like other religious codifiers: he tried also to give a reason for them. Deficient as the Ẓedah la-Derek is as a code, its author has succeeded remarkably well in bringing to light the religious element in the Jewish ceremonial. At the same time he is far removed from mysticism (comp. ib. ed. Sabbionetta, iv. 4, 1, p. 187), possessing an unusually wide mental horizon. Although his parents and brothers fell victim to religious hatred, he still maintained that the superiority of Israel as the "chosen people" is based upon their fulfilling God's word, and "that a non-Jew who lives in accordance with God's will is more worthy than a Jew who does not perform it" (ib. i. 1, 33, p. 39). In dogmatical questions Menahem was more inclined to a strictly Orthodox point of view than to a philosophical one, although he believed that the Biblical stories of the Creation and the Bible's teaching about the resurrection contained mysteries, which he did not venture to solve. In a Turin manuscript (A. iv. 37) are given laws by him on shehitah and bedikah, perhaps excerpted from his larger work.

== Jewish Encyclopedia bibliography ==
- Meyer Kayserling, Geschichte der Juden in Spanien und Portugal, i. 84;
- Ẓedah la-Derek, p. 16a;
- Almanzi-Luzzatto, Abne Zikkaron, pp. 14–16 (where the date of Menahem's death is given together with the inscription on his tomb; the Jewish chronographers place his death eleven years earlier)
- Moritz Steinschneider, Cat. Bodl. s.v.;
- Ernest Renan-Adolf Neubauer, Ecrivains Juifs, pp. 361
