= Guess Who? =

Children's board game

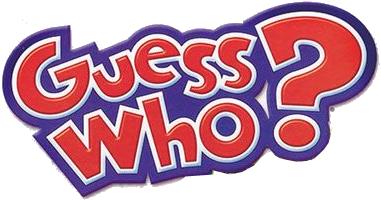

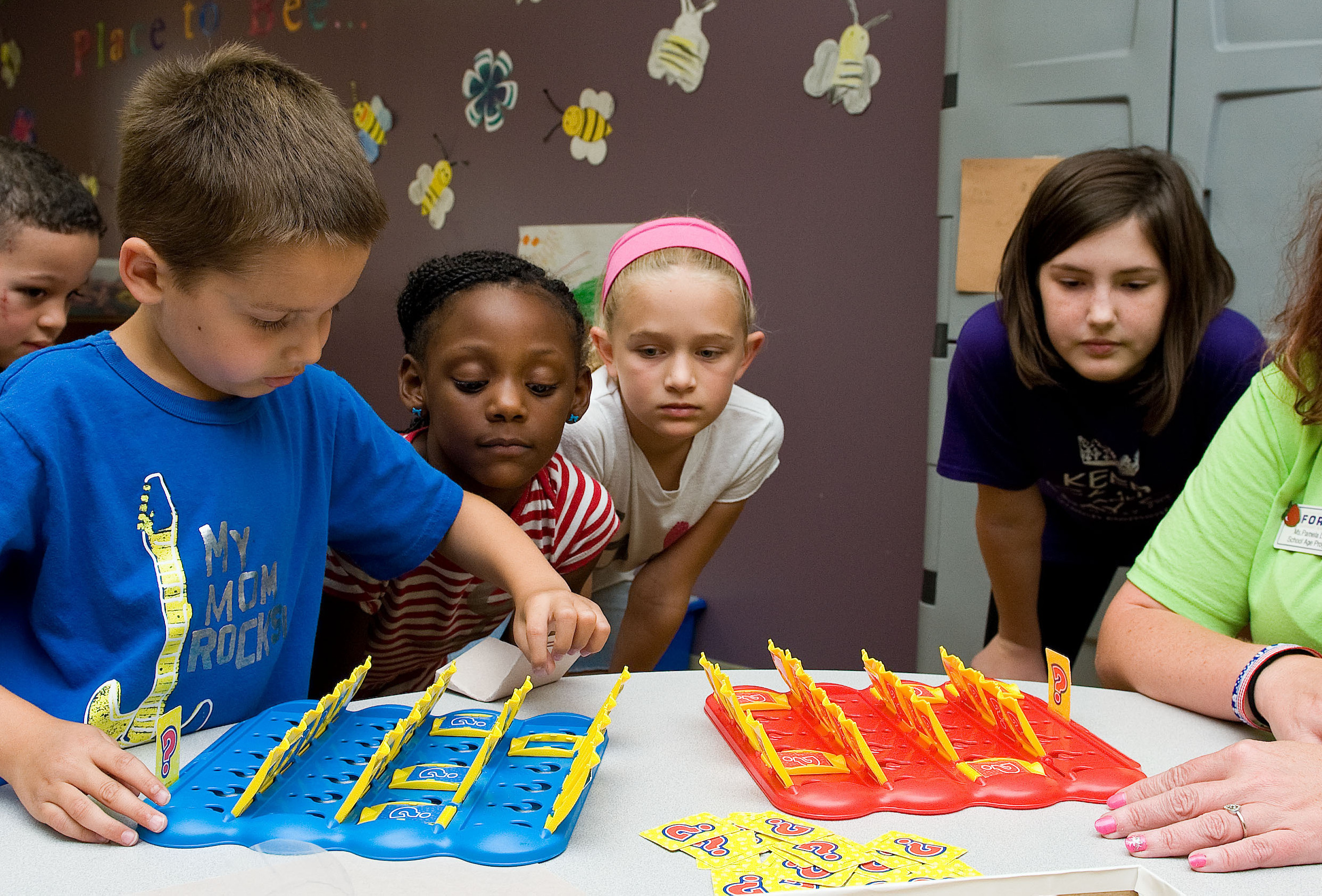
- A group of children playing the game
- Designers: Theo Coster; Ora Coster; Theora Design
- Illustrators: Theora Design
- Publishers: Milton Bradley
- Publication: 1979; 47 years ago
- Years active: 1979–present
- Genres: Board game
- Languages: English
- Players: 2
- Playing time: 20'
- Age range: 6+

Guess Who? is a two-player board game in which players each guess the identity of the other's chosen character. The game was developed by Israeli game inventors Ora and Theo Coster, the founders of Theora Design. It was first released in Dutch in 1979 under the name Wie is het?. Milton Bradley then produced the game in the United Kingdom, and it was brought to the United States in 1982. It is now owned by Hasbro.

== Gameplay ==
Each player starts the game with a board that includes cartoon images of 24 people and their first names with all the images standing up. Each player selects a card of their choice from a separate pile of cards containing the same 24 images. The objective of the game is to be the first to determine which card one's opponent has selected. Players alternate asking various yes or no questions to eliminate some of the candidates, such as:

- "Does your person wear a hat?"
- "Does your person wear glasses?"
- "Is your person a man?"

The player will then eliminate candidates (based on the opponent's response) by flipping those images down until only one is left. Well-crafted questions allow players to eliminate one or more possible cards.

== Editions ==
Special editions which have different faces have been released, including Star Wars (released 2008 with 24 characters, and 2014 with 15 characters), Batman (released 2019), Animal Crossing (2019), Marvel Comics (released 2022, 24 characters), Super Mario (2022), Disney, Mr. Men, Peppa Pig and The Simpsons. There are smaller, "travel" editions that have only 20 different faces. In 2008 and 2010, extra and mix and match games were released. A computer game based on the series was released in 1999 by Hasbro Interactive/Infogrames. In 1999 a Scratchcard version of the game was released.

== Advertising ==
In the United States, advertisements for the board game often showed the characters on the cards coming to life and making witty comments to each other. This caused later editions of such ads to carry the spoken disclaimer line "game cards do not actually talk" to meet Federal Trade Commission advertising guidelines requiring full disclosure of toy features unable to be replicated with the actual product.

== Strategy ==
Popular belief is that a binary search is the most efficient approach to the game, in which each question halves the number of possible identities. This can be applied by asking complex questions—such as "Does your character have red hair, or glasses, or a big nose?"—where a yes or a no eliminates exactly half of the remaining characters. Such a strategy takes only four questions to reduce the field to three people, giving the fifth question a 50/50 chance of identifying the opponent's character.

The game was strongly solved by Mihai Nica in 2016. Nica's research found that while a player was ahead their optimal strategy was a binary search, and when behind they should instead make "bold plays" that had a chance of narrowing things down significantly, in order to pull ahead of the other player. Using this method, the player that goes first has a 63% chance of winning under optimal play by both sides.

== Use in education ==
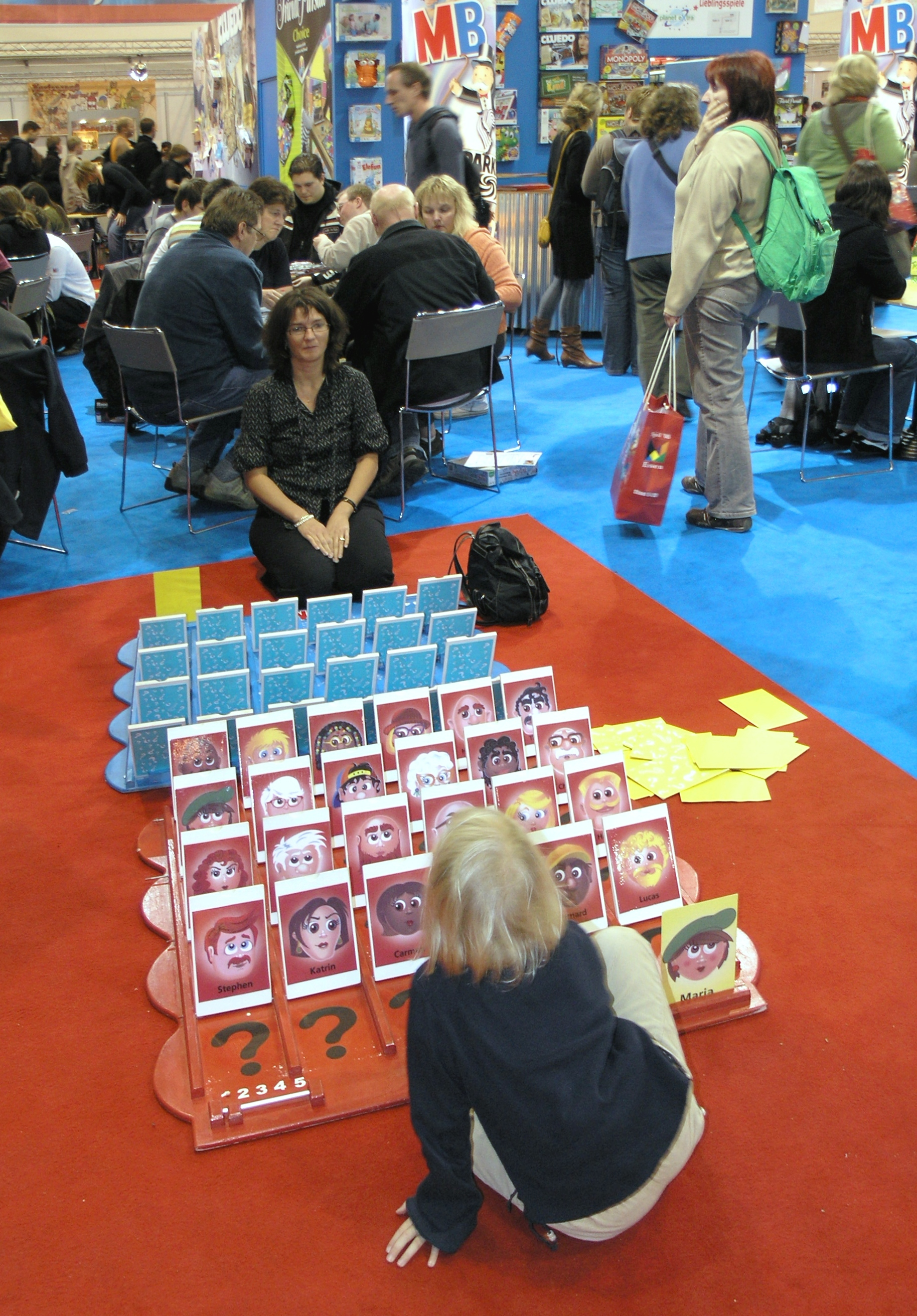
A giant-sized game of Guess Who? at the Spiel festival, 2008

Guess Who? has been used in educational contexts, including the development of deductive reasoning skills. In addition, the game can be used for a wide range of speech and language development goals, including:

- Articulation
- Comprehension
- Question formation
- Describing salient features
- Vocabulary in foreign languages

== Criticism of lack of diversity ==
Some have noted a bias toward white and male characters in Guess Who?. In 2012, a freelance journalist wrote to Hasbro on behalf of her six-year-old daughter, asking why there were only five female characters to choose from, as opposed to nineteen male characters. Hasbro's response said that the game was based around "a numerical equation", noting that there were five of each characteristic in the game (such as wearing glasses or having red hair), and that the game was intended to "draw attention away from using gender or ethnicity as the focal point, and to concentrate on those things that we all have in common, rather than focus on our differences."

In response to Hasbro's statement, the journalist said that she thought identifying physical differences was "the whole point" of the game, and asked: "Why is female gender regarded as a 'characteristic', while male gender is not?" New Statesman criticized the "tone-deafness" of Hasbro's remarks.

Some editions of the game since the early 2000s have included more women. In the 2018 edition of the game, half of the characters are female and a rule has been added saying "For an added challenge, don't ask if your opponent's mystery character is male or female until the third turn!"

The original version of Guess Who? featured only one non-white character—Anne, a black woman who was redrawn in a subsequent edition as white. More recently, Hasbro has redesigned the board to feature a more racially diverse set of people.

== Television adaptation ==
On April 19, 2021, Deadline Hollywood announced that a planned unscripted television adaptation of the board game was in early development at NBC and would be produced by Endemol Shine North America and Entertainment One (Hasbro's subsidiary).

== Characters ==
Name	Also known as	Gender	Eyes	Hair	Beard	Moustache	Big nose	Glasses	Hat	Introduced	Retired	Notes
Al	Alfred, Stephen	Male	Blue	Light brown	No	Yes	No	No	No	1980	—	
Alex	—	Male	Brown	Black	No	Yes	No	No	No	1980	2018	
Amy	—	Female	Brown	Highlights	No	No	No	Yes	No	2018	—	
Anita	—	Female	Blue	Blonde	No	No	No	No	No	1980	2018	
Anne	—	Female	Brown	Black	No	No	Yes	No	No	1980	2018	Absent from 1998 to 2002
Ben	—	Male	Brown	Dark brown	No	No	Yes	Yes	No	2018	—	
Bernard	—	Male	Brown	Dark brown	No	No	Yes	No	Yes	1980	2018	
Betty	—	Female	Blue	White	No	No	No	Yes	No	1999	2001	
Bill	Phillipe	Male	Brown	Light brown	Yes	No	No	No	No	1980	2018	
Carmen	—	Female	Brown	White	No	No	No	No	No	2002	—	
Charles	Hans	Male	Brown	Blonde	No	Yes	No	No	No	1980	2018	
Claire	Sarah	Female	Brown	Light brown	No	No	No	Yes	Yes	1980	2018	
Daniel	—	Male	Green	Light brown	Yes	Yes	Yes	No	No	2018	—	
David	Luke, Lucas	Male	Brown	Blonde	Yes	No	No	No	Yes	1980	—	
Emma	—	Female	Brown	Light brown	No	No	No	No	No	2018	—	
Eric	—	Male	Brown	Blonde	No	No	No	No	Yes	1980	—	
Farah	—	Female	Blue	Black	No	No	No	No	No	2018	—	
Frans	Frank	Male	Brown	Light brown	No	No	No	No	No	1980	1998	
Gabe	—	Male	Brown	Black	No	No	No	No	No	2018	—	
George	Joe	Male	Brown	White	No	No	No	No	Yes	1980	2001	
Herman	—	Male	Brown	Light brown	No	No	Yes	No	No	1980	2018	
Holly	Katrin	Female	Brown	Dark brown	No	No	No	No	No	1999	2018	
Joe	—	Male	Brown	Blonde	No	No	No	Yes	No	1980	—	Absent from 1998 to 2002
Jordan	—	Male	Brown	Highlights	Yes	Yes	No	No	No	2018	—	
Katie	—	Female	Blue	Blonde	No	No	No	No	Yes	2018	—	
Laura	—	Female	Green	Black	No	No	No	No	No	2018	—	
Leo	—	Male	Brown	White	No	Yes	No	No	No	2018	—	
Lily	—	Female	Green	Dark brown	No	No	No	No	Yes	2018	—	
Liz	—	Female	Blue	White	No	No	No	Yes	No	2018	—	
Maria	—	Female	Brown	Dark brown	No	No	No	No	Yes	1980	2018	
Max	Theo	Male	Brown	Dark brown	No	Yes	Yes	No	No	1980	2018	
Mia	—	Female	Brown	Black	No	No	No	No	No	2018	—	
Mike	—	Male	Brown	Black	No	No	No	No	Yes	2018	—	
Nick	—	Male	Brown	Blonde	No	No	Yes	No	No	2018	—	
Olivia	—	Female	Brown	Highlights	No	No	No	No	No	2018	—	
Paul	—	Male	Brown	White	No	No	No	Yes	No	1980	2018	
Peter	—	Male	Blue	White	No	No	Yes	No	No	1980	2018	Absent from 1998 to 2002
Philip	Max, Mario	Male	Brown	Black	Yes	No	No	No	No	1980	2018	
Rachel	—	Female	Blue	Dark brown	No	No	No	Yes	No	2018	—	
Richard	Roger	Male	Brown	Dark brown	Yes	Yes	No	No	No	1980	2018	
Robert	—	Male	Blue	Dark brown	No	No	Yes	No	No	1980	1999	
Sally	Sophie	Female	Brown	Black	No	No	No	No	No	1999	2018	
Sam	Charles	Male	Brown	White	No	No	No	Yes	No	1980	—	
Sofia	—	Female	Green	Dark brown	No	No	No	No	No	2018	—	
Susan	—	Female	Brown	White	No	No	No	No	No	1980	1998	
Tom	Albert, Daniel	Male	Blue	Black	No	No	No	Yes	No	1980	2018	
Victor	—	Male	Brown	White	No	No	No	No	No	1999	2018	
