= Eye popper =

Children's toy

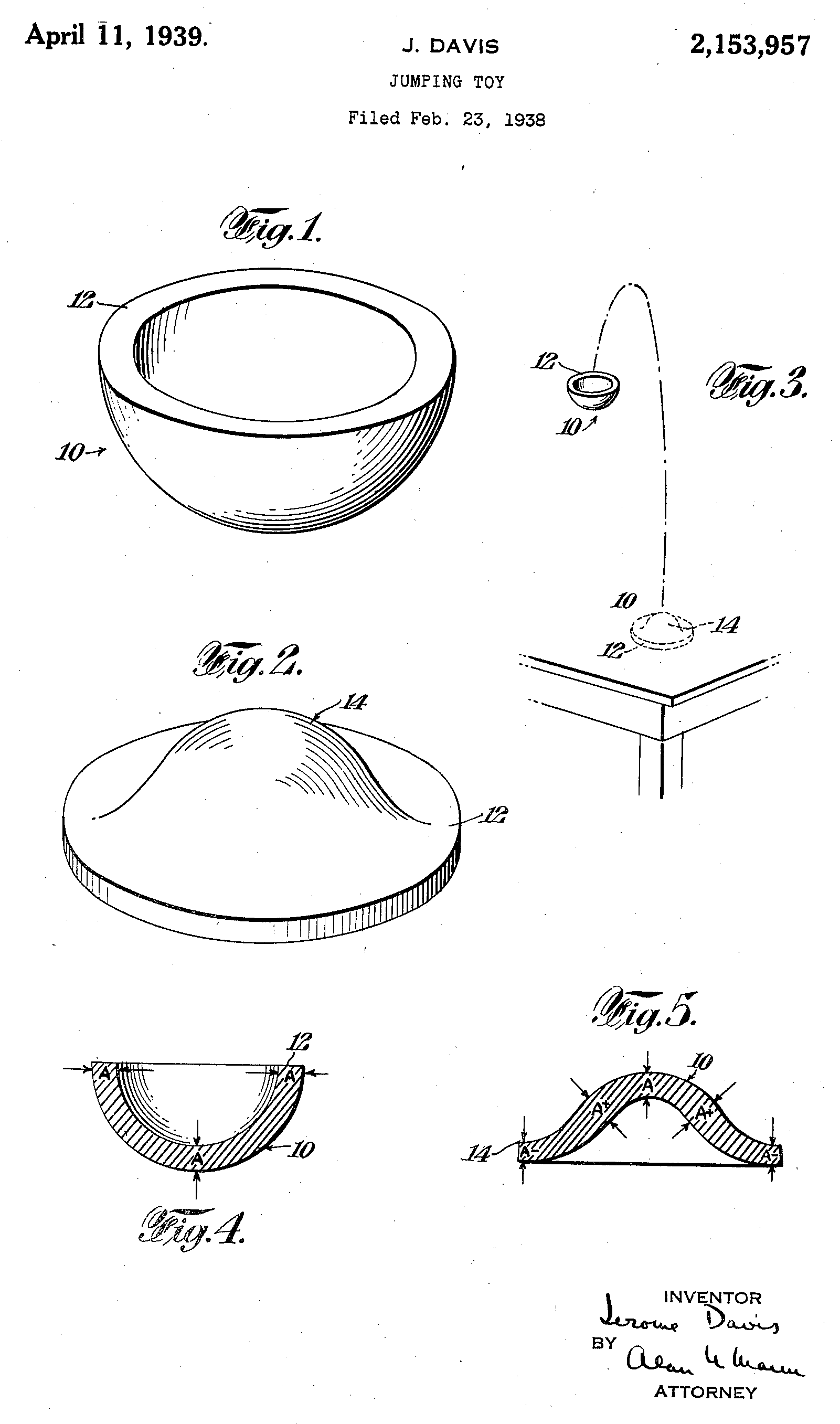
U.S. patent 2,153,957

An eye popper, rubber popper, hopper popper or jumping popper is a children's toy. It consists of a small, dome-shaped piece of rubber or similar material resembling a half of a rubber ball; the shape of a smile is often imprinted on the dome. When pressed, the object inverts and becomes unstable and, after a few seconds, undergoes snap-through buckling to pop back into its original shape, making a loud popping sound. If resting on the ground when this happens, the toy will fly several feet into the air. It can also be thrown on the ground, causing it to pop upward. The eye popper's behavior resembles the process by which a ball compresses upon hitting a hard surface.

== See also ==
- Pop it
