= Jeanne Peiffer =

Luxembourgish historian of mathematics (born 1948)

Jeanne Peiffer (born 20 August 1948 in Mersch) is a Luxembourgish historian of mathematics. She is Emeritus Research Director at the CNRS, at the Center Alexandre Koyré of the CNRS, and at the École des hautes études en sciences sociales (EHESS).

== Biography ==
Peiffer studied at the University of Luxembourg where she was a professor after being a student of René Taton.

She was co-editor (with Pierre Costabel) of the correspondence of Johann Bernoulli (Birkhäuser 1988, 1992) and published a French translation of the geometry of Albrecht Dürer. With Amy Dahan, she wrote a popular French-language history of mathematics that was translated into English and German. From 1995 to 2015 she was co-editor of the Revue d'histoire des mathématiques and co-editor of Historia Mathematica.

She deals with scientific journals in the 17th and 18th centuries, also from a scientific sociological point of view and with the aspect of the history of the specialization of mathematics journals, with perspective in the Renaissance in connection with geometry and optics, and the letter as a communication tool of mathematics in the 18th century.

== Publications ==
- Dahan-Dalmédico, Amy; Peiffer, Jeanne (1986). Une histoire des mathématiques: routes et dédales (in French). Paris: Editions du Seuil. ISBN 978-2-02-009138-1.
  - (English translation) Dahan-Dalmedico, Amy; Pieffer, Jeanne (3 August 2020). History of Mathematics: Highways and Byways. American Mathematical Soc. ISBN 978-1-4704-5746-4.
- Herausgeberin und Übersetzerin: Albrecht Dürer, Géométrie, Ed. du Seuil 1995 (also translated into Spanish)
- Faire des mathématiques par lettres, Revue d'histoire des mathématiques IV/1, 1998, pp. 143–157
- Peiffer, Jeanne; Vitu, Jean-Pierre (2008). "Les journaux savants, formes de la communication et agents de la construction des savoirs (17e -18e siècles)". Dix-Huitième Siècle (in German). 40: 281–300. doi:10.3917/dhs.040.0281. ISSN 0070-6760.
- Constructing perspective in sixteenth-century Nuremberg, in: Mario Carpo, Frédérique Lemerle (publisher), Perspective, Projections & Design. Technologies of Architectural Representation, London & New York : Routledge, 2007, pp. 65–76
