= Bahir =

Early work of Jewish Kabbalah

Bahir or Sefer HaBahir (Hebrew: סֵפֶר הַבָּהִיר, Hebrew pronunciation: [ˈsefeʁ ˌhabaˈhiʁ]; "Book of Clarity" or "Book of Illumination") is an anonymous mystical work, attributed to a 1st-century rabbinic sage Nehunya ben HaKanah (a contemporary of Yochanan ben Zakai) because it begins with the words, "R. Nehunya ben HaKanah said". It is also known as Midrash of Rabbi Nehunya ben HaKanah מִדְרָשׁ רַבִּי נְחוּנְיָא בֶּן הַקָּנָה.

First mentioned in late 12th-century Languedoc/Provencal works, the Bahir is an early work of the esoteric Jewish mystical tradition that eventually became known as Kabbalah. The work is considered by scholars to be pseudepigraphical, composed in Provence in the late 12th century.

== Title ==
Nahmanides, in his commentary on the Torah, (Genesis 1) is one of the first to quote the work under the title Midrash R. Nehunya ben HaKanah. ("R. Nehunya ben HaKanah said," the opening sentence)

Among medieval Kabbalists it became known as Sefer HaBahir, taken from its opening comment, "One verse says: 'And now men see not the light which is bright (bahir) in the skies'" (Job 37:21).

== Authorship ==
Kabbalists ascribed authorship of the Bahir to R. Nehunya, a rabbi of the Mishnaic era, who lived around 100 CE. Medieval Kabbalists write that the Bahir did not come down to them as a unified book, but rather in pieces found in scattered scrolls and booklets. The scattered and fragmentary nature of the Bahir's text, which sometimes ends discussion in mid-sentence, and which often jumps randomly from topic to topic, supports this claim.

The historical critical study of this book points to a later date of composition. For some time scholars believed that it was written in the 13th century by Isaac the Blind, or by those in his school. The first sentence, "And now men see not the light which is bright in the skies" (Job 37:21), being isolated, and having no connection with what follows, was taken to be an allusion to the blindness of its author. However, modern scholars of Kabbalah now hold that at least part of the Bahir was an adaptation of an older work, the Sefer Raza Rabba. This older book is mentioned in some of the works of the Geonim; however no complete copies of Sefer Raza Rabba are still in existence. However, quotes from this book can still be found in some older works. Scholar Ronit Meroz argues that elements in the Bahir date back to 10th century Babylonia, as witnessed by the acceptance of the Babylonian system of vowel points, which later fell into disuse, while other elements were written in 12th century Provence.

Many scholars of Kabbalah hold that the Bahir adds gnostic elements to the older work. The question of how much gnosticism has influenced Kabbalah is one of the major themes of modern-day research on Kabbalah; see the works of Gershom Scholem and Moshe Idel for more information.

There is a striking affinity between the symbolism of Sefer HaBahir, on the one hand, and the speculations of the Gnostics, and the theory of the "aeons," on the other. The fundamental problem in the study of the book is: is this affinity based on an as yet unknown historical link between the gnosticism of the mishnaic and talmudic era and the sources from which the material in Sefer HaBahir is derived? Or should it possibly be seen as a purely psychological phenomenon, i.e., as a spontaneous upsurge from the depths of the soul's imagination, without any historical continuity?
Bahir, Encyclopedia Judaica, Keter Publishing

== History ==
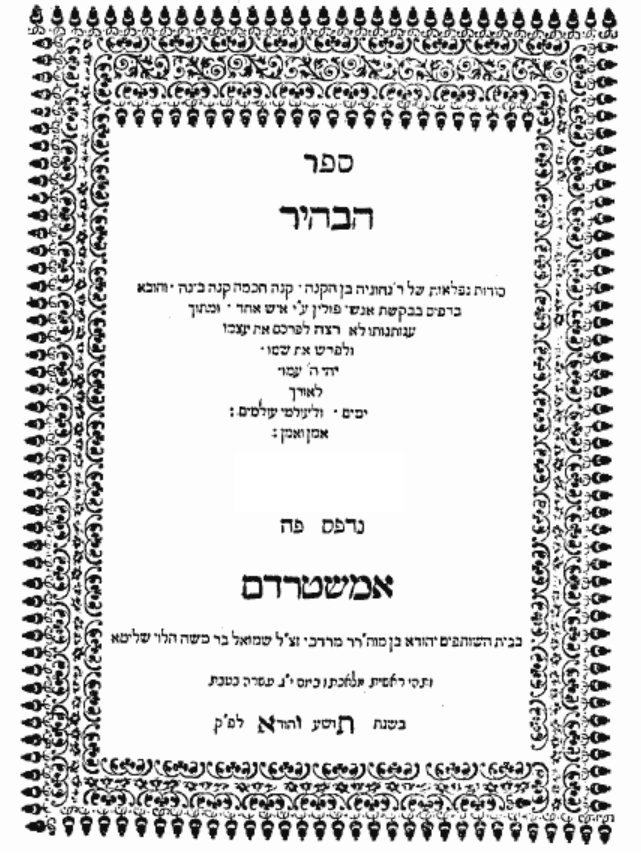
Title page of Bahir, 1651 edition

- Kabbalists believe that oral tradition of the Bahir goes back to the 1st century CE. It is possible that some secret manuscripts existed before publication in the 12th century.
- c. 1174 - The Bahir was published by the Provence school of Kabbalists and was circulated to a limited audience in manuscript form.
- 1298 - The earliest extant manuscript dates from the end of the 13th century.
- 1331 - Earliest commentary on the Bahir is written by Rabbi Meir ben Shalom Abi-Sahula, a disciple of Shlomo ben Aderet (Rashba), and it is published anonymously under the title Or HaGanuz.
- End of 15th century - The Bahir is translated into Latin by Flavius Mithridates but this translation is wordy and not useful.
- 1651 - The Bahir is published in Amsterdam together with Mayan HaChakhmah in printed form.
- 1706 - The Bahir is published in Berlin together with Mayan HaChakhmah.
- 1784 - The Bahir is published in Sklav and Koretz.
- 1800 - The Bahir is published in Lvov.
- 1830 - The Bahir is published in Lvov.
- 1849 - The Bahir is published in unknown place as part of Chamishah Chumshey Kabbalah.
- 1865 - The Bahir is published in Lvov.
- 1883 - The Bahir is published in Vilna.
- 1913 - The Bahir is published in Vilna.
- 1923 - German translation is published by Gershom Scholem.
- 1951 - The Bahir is published in Jerusalem.
- 1979 - English translation by Rabbi Aryeh Kaplan is published.
- 1980 - Latin Translation (Guillaume Postel's) is published by François Secret.
- 1994 - Hebrew Text is published from the manuscripts by Daniel Abrams.
- 2005 - Latin Translation (Flavius Mithridates') is published, together with a critical edition of the Hebrew text, by Saverio Campanini.

The 13th-century kabbalist, Rabbi Isaac HaKohen, reports that the Sefer HaBahir "came from the Land of Israel to the early pietists, the sages of Ashkenaz, the kabbalists of Germany and from there to the early wise men in Provence who chase after all sorts of written (records of) wisdom, those who know the divine, supernal knowledge. But they saw only part of the book and not all of it because they did not see it in its entirety, in its complete form."

Several distinct literary layers can be distinguished in Bahir – some written in the East at the end of the 9th century or in the early 10th century, and some in 12th century Provence. The Book Bahir's use of the Babylonian grammar and vocalization system (which also reflects a different pronunciation and was widely utilized throughout the East) decisively proves the existence of an Oriental layer. The Babylonian vocalization, as opposed to the Tiberian one used in Hebrew to this day, is mainly upper (that is, marked above the letters) and is characterized, among other properties, by the segol being pronounced like a patah. Only if Bahir was written in a region in which the Babylonian system was in use can the claim "the Lord placed a patah above (a letter) and a segol beneath" be meaningful. The patah is upper according to the Babylonian vocalization system, whereas the segol is lower according to the Tiberian system. Only according to the Babylonian system is it possible to pronounce this combination of vowels at the same time, as they both have the same pronunciation (the short u).

The use of the Babylonian vocalization system to symbolize the Holy is evidence of the passage's date of composition: At the beginning of the 10th century, a debate arose between Jewish communities over which grammatical system most faithfully represented the Torah; in other words, how was it pronounced when it was given to Moses on Mount Sinai? This debate ended with the victory of the Tiberian system and with the understanding that the Babylonian system reflected a foreign influence on the Hebrew language. Thereafter, one could no longer employ it as a proper symbolic instrument for the Holy. Hence, the Babylonian layer must have been written before this debate was concluded.

== Contents ==
The Bahir assumes the form of an exegetic midrash on the first chapters of Genesis. It is divided into sixty short paragraphs or a hundred and forty passages, and is in the form of a dialogue between master and disciples.

The main characters are "R. Amora" (or "Amorai"), and "R. Rahamai" (or "Rehumai"). Some statements in the book are attributed to R. Berechiah, R. Johanan, R. Bun, rabbis mentioned in the later midrashic literature.

The Bahir contains commentaries explaining the mystical significance of Biblical verses; the mystical significance of the shapes of the Hebrew letters; the mystical significance of the cantillation signs and vowel points on the letters; the mystical significance of statements in the Sefer Yetzirah ("Book of Creation"); and the use of sacred names in magic.

There are two hundred aphorism-like paragraphs. Each paragraph uses references from the Torah to expand upon its presentation. As with all Kabbalistic texts the meanings are highly symbolic and subject to numerous opportunities for interpretation. A common analogy is used throughout. A king, his servants, his daughter and his gardens are all used to explain a meaning, first of Torah and then in general, of the main topic of the text. The paragraphs refer to each other in segments and are broken into five sections in the Aryeh Kaplan translation. These sections are loosely grouped together but they do more or less stay within the underlying themes given by their title.

=== Sections ===
Section 1 (v. 1–16) consists of commentary on the first verses of Genesis or of the Creation Story.

Section 2 (v. 17–44) talks about the Aleph-Beth or the Hebrew alphabet and gets its inspiration from the Sefer Yetzirah, which links these letters of creation to the overall mysticism presented in the Torah.

Section 3 (v. 45–122) concerns the Seven Voices and the Sefirot.

Section 4 (v. 124–193) is grouped under the section title of Ten Sefirot.

Section 5 (v. 193–200) completes the discourse and is called Mysteries of the Soul.

=== Sefirot ===
The Hebrew word "sefirot" was first described in Sefer Yezirah as corresponding to the ten basic numbers, and did not possess the meaning that later Kabbalists gave to it. It is in the Bahir that we find the first discussion of the Kabbalistic concept of Sefirot as divine attributes and powers emanating from God.

“Why are they called סְפִירוֹת (sefirot)? Because it is written, The heavens מְסַפְּרִים (mesaprim), tell, God’s glory (Psalms 19:2)” (Bahir §125 [Scholem]).

=== Creation of the universe ===
The world, according to the Bahir, is not the product of an act of creation. Like God, this book existed from all eternity, not only in potentiality, but in actuality; and the Creation consisted merely in the appearance of that which was latent in the first "Sefirah," "Or HaGanuz," or, as it is called, "Keter 'Elyon", which emanated from God.

This Sefirah gave birth to "Hokmah" (Wisdom), from which emanated "Binah" (Intelligence). From these three, which are the superior "Sefirot", and from the primary principles of the universe, emanated, one after another, the seven inferior Sefirot from which all material beings are formed. All the ten Sefirot are linked one to the other, and every one of them has an active and a passive quality—emanating and receiving. The efflux of one Sefirah from another is symbolized in the form of the letters of the Hebrew alphabet. Thus the letter gimel (ג), shaped like a tube open at each end, represents a Sefirah, which receives strength at one end and discharges it at the other. The ten Sefirot are the energy of God, the forms in which His being manifests itself.

=== Reincarnation ===
The Bahir adopts the concept of reincarnation to solve the question of why the just may suffer in this world, while the wicked may be prosperous: "The just may have been wicked in their former lives, and the wicked righteous."

== Editions and commentaries ==
One of the most accurate manuscripts of the final form of Sefer Bahir was written in 1331 by Meir ben Solomon Abi-Sahula; his commentary on the Bahir was anonymously published as Or HaGanuz, "The Hidden Light".

It has been translated into German by Gershom Scholem (1923) and into English by Aryeh Kaplan.

Recently it has been critically edited by Saverio Campanini. See The Book of Bahir. Flavius Mithridates' Latin Translation, the Hebrew Text, and an English Version, edited by Saverio Campanini with a Foreword by Giulio Busi, Torino, Nino Aragno Editore 2005.

== See also ==
- Kabbalah
- Primary texts of Kabbalah
- Sefer HaRazim
- Semiphoras and Schemhamphorash
