= Socker Boppers =

Children's toy

Socker Boppers (formerly Sock'em Boppers) is a children's toy popularized in the late 1990s by Big Time Toys. Socker Boppers and their spin-off products such as Sock'em Swords, Sock'em Shields, and Sock'em Screamers have sold more than five million units in the United States and internationally in such countries as Canada, Great Britain, Australia, New Zealand, and Mexico. In the 1990s, the package tagline and the television ad and video jingle was "more fun than a pillow fight!".

Socker Boppers were first made and sold by Centsable Products, Inc., in the 1970s, when the toy was a top 10 best-seller among all toys. The original packaging included a photo of two children, one of which was owner Tom Mayfield's son, playing with the toy.

In 2002-03, Mattel sued Big Time Toys for $1 million for trademark infringement over the use of the name "Sock'em Boppers," claiming that the name infringed on the name of their toy "Rock'em Sock'em Robots," which was eventually settled when Big Time Toys changed the name of the product to Socker Boppers. Eventually, Big Time Toys made spin-off products including Sock'em Swords, Sock'em Shields, and Sock'em Screamers.

Sock'em Boppers underwent something of a renaissance in the mid- to late-2000s, spurred on in equal parts by nostalgia and their increased availability from online retail stores. A July 24, 2006 article in the Chicago Tribune reports that "sales ... of [Sock'em Boppers] saw an increase of 18% between 2005 and 2006, ... the product's strongest showing in almost a decade."

In January 2012, Socker Boppers were launched in the UK at the London Toy Fair by London-based toy company Wicked Vision, which purchased rights from Big Time Toys.
