= Meir ben Judah Leib Poppers =

Meir ben Judah Leib Poppers or Meir ben Judah Loeb Ha-Kohen Ashkenazi Poppers (c. 1624–1662) was a Bohemian rabbi and kabbalist. He was born in Prague and died in Jerusalem in February or March, 1662.

He studied the Kabbala under Israel Ashkenazi and Jacob Zemah, and he wrote a great number of works, all in the spirit of Isaac Luria; thirty-nine of them have "Or" as the beginning of their titles, in reference to his name "Meir." His works which have been published are: Or Ẓaddiḳim (Hamburg, 1690), a mystical methodology, or exhortation to asceticism, based upon Isaac Luria's writings, the Zohar, and other moral works (an enlarged edition of this work was published later under the title Or haYashar [Fürth, 1754]); Or Penei Melekh, a treatise on the mysteries of the prayers and commandments, condensed and published under the title Sefer Kavanot Tefillot uMitzvot (Hamburg, 1690); Me'orei Or, an alphabetical arrangement of the kabbalistic sacred names found in Isaac Luria's Sefer haKavanot, published by Elijah ben Azriel, with the commentary Ya'ir Nativ of Nathan Mannheimer and Jacob ben Benjamin Wolf, under the title Me'orot Natan (Frankfort-on-the-Main, 1709); Mesillot Ḥokhmah (Shklov, 1785), regulations and rules for the study of the Kabbala.

Among his unpublished works the following may be mentioned: Or Rav, a commentary on the Zohar; Or haAvuḳah, a treatise on the Kabbala; Or Zarua, a commentary on Hayyim Vital's Derekh 'Eẓ ha-Ḥayyim; Or Ner, on the transmigration of souls; Or Ẓaḥ, on the order in which souls are linked together; Derushim al haTorah, homilies on the Pentateuch; Matoḳ ha-Or, a kabbalistic commentary on the aggadah of the Talmud and Midrash Rabbah.

He is buried on the Mount of Olives.
