= Faturan =

Material used to make beads

Faturan, in Middle Eastern beadwork, is a material used to make beads, notably in the making of komboloi and misbaha.

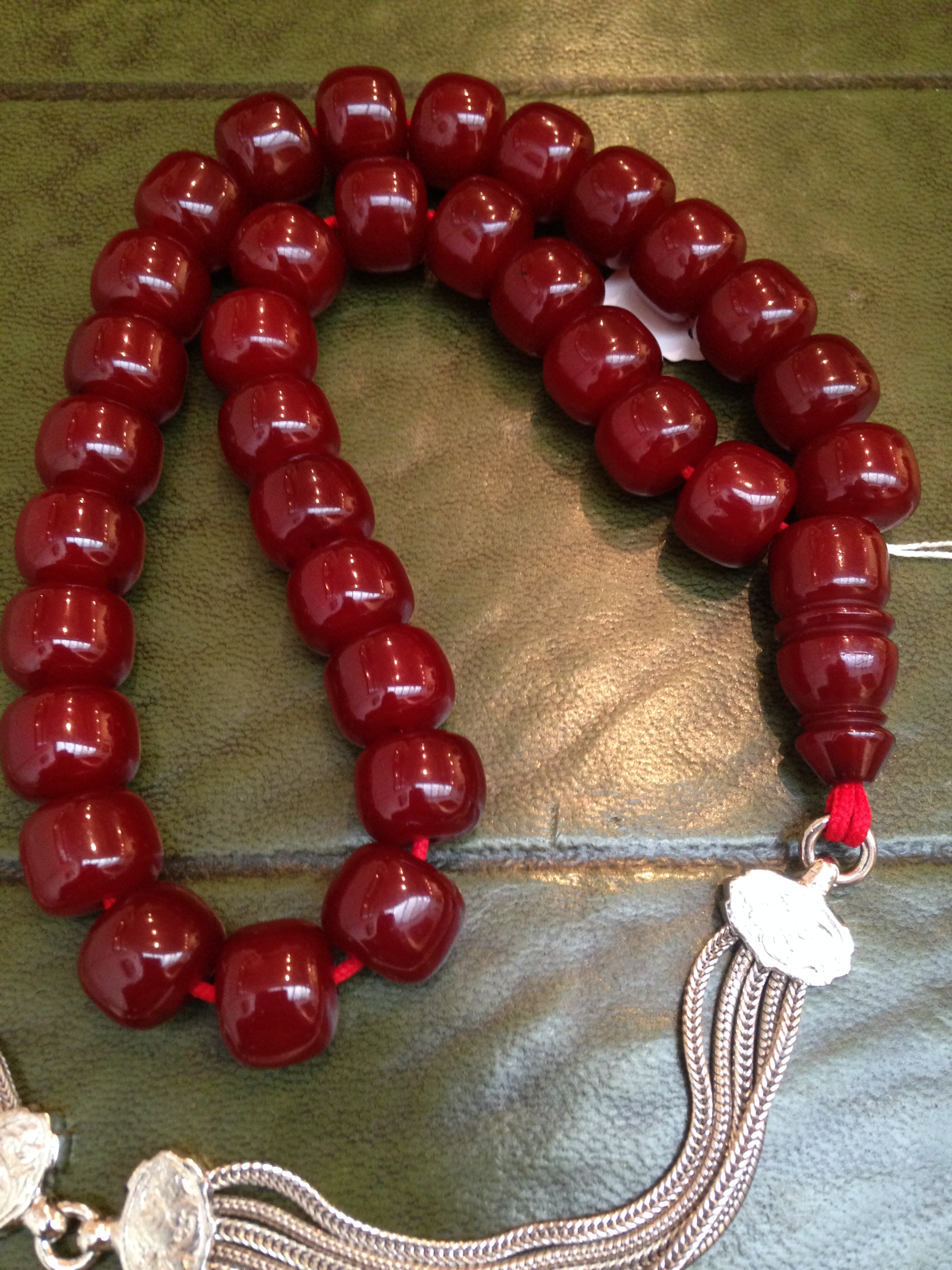
An Ottoman marbled Faturan prayer bead strand

== History ==
"Bakelite" and "Parkesine" are both synthetic resins named after their inventors. And so "Faturan", named after its original inventor, became a brand of cast thermosetting phenol formaldehyde resin, similar to Bakelite and Catalin, manufactured by Traun & Son of Hamburg., developed in the early 20th century, and produced until the 1940s.

== In the bead trade ==
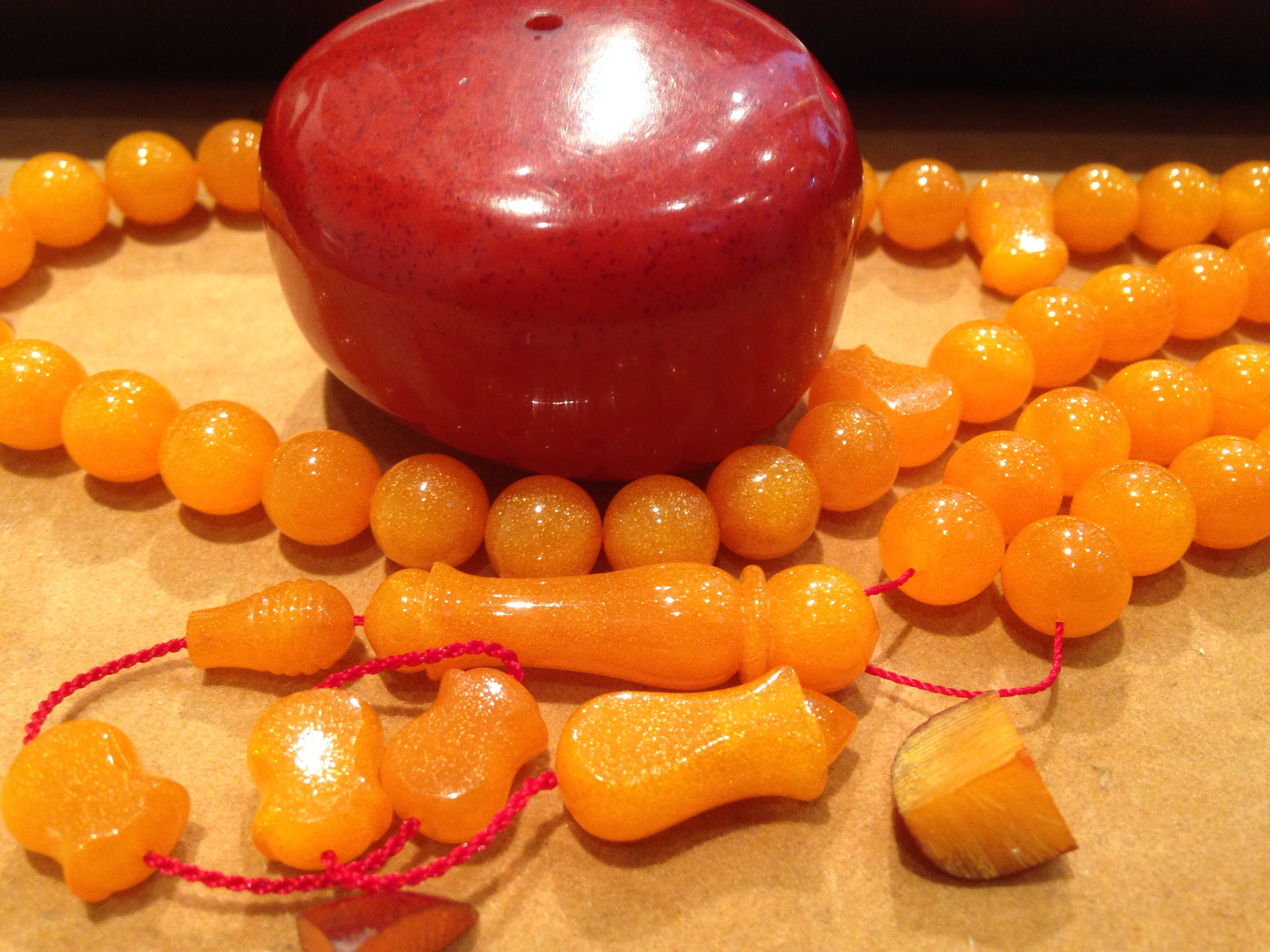
A carved gold dust Faturan prayer bead strand made from North African tribal beads

In the bead trade, "Faturan" is thought to be a mixture of natural amber shavings with other materials, and is described as having been invented in the Middle East in the 18th or 19th century, however, there is some dispute over this within the trade.

The Komboloi Museum, Nafplio, Greece, insists that a Kuwaiti chemist called Esmaeel Almail Faturan first made beads from amber fillings mixed with other natural resins, rather than synthetic, long before the well known synthetic resins were mass-produced. The National Historical Museum, Athens, has on display komboloi made of Faturan dating to 1821.

"Faturan" became the protected brand name of one particular German company who mass-produced synthetic resin in rod form for making beads. These beads are now rare, but rarer still are the handmade beads of Arava Faturan's time.

The first Bakelite that arrived in Turkey and the Middle East in the early 1900s was mainly in the form of drawer and furniture knobs and handles. This coincided with when the first prayer bead strands made of Bakelite began to appear on the market.

The bead carvers, mainly in Turkey, were swift to understand that Bakelite was a material that could be well carved, had a great appearance, and could replace amber. Each master also had his secret "recipe", even heating in various liquids and oils, and making it undergo various physical or chemical processes to obtain the most beautiful product.

The original and genuine Faturan beads were mainly in shades of red or yellow. The last genuine Faturan beads were made in the 1940s, and production ended mainly due to the Second World War, when the supply of raw material became very scarce. The demand for genuine Faturan, often confused for amber, has always been great among prayer bead, tasbih and komboloi collectors. Genuine pre-war Faturan, with beads still intact, in complete strands, and made from one single type of material, are considered museum items and fetch extremely high prices by both institutional and individual auction bidders.

== Faturan oxidization ==
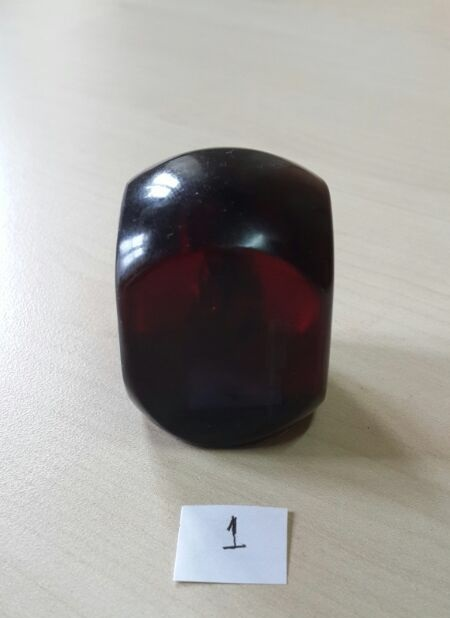
A 1930s Faturan shift knob. Oxidization means this car gear stick knob appears to be a dark cherry color on the outside.

Faturan, as a material, displays an extreme example of a characteristic common to most phenolics - surface oxidization. Most phenolic will, over time, oxidize to a darker form of its original color. However, Faturan has the unique characteristic of always oxidizing to a dark red, regardless of the original color. This red color caused the material to become known as 'cherry amber' in the Middle East. If the red surface oxidization is removed, the original color of the material is exposed underneath.

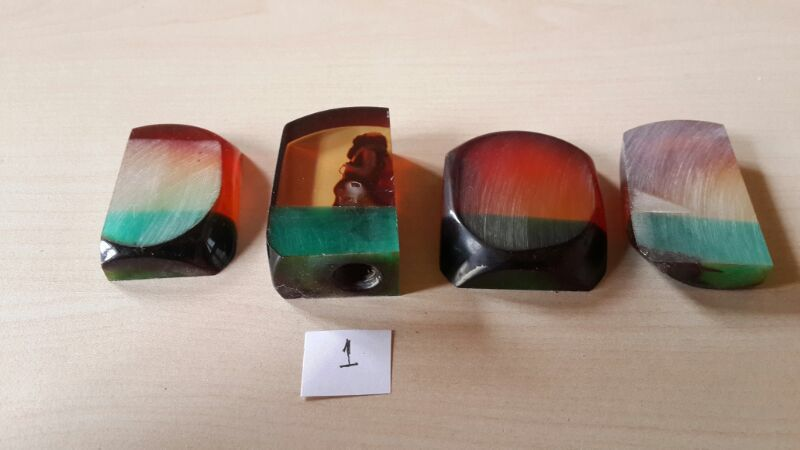
Faturan shift knob cut into segments. Once cut into segments the true color of the material is revealed as green with a translucent yellow top.

== Faturan types ==
The most widely known types of Faturan is called damar. The swirls show the combination of more than one type of Faturan being mixed and combined, for example, transparent mixed with a dark color. Most Ottoman Faturan prayer beads were made from Faturan rods that have a swirl effect. This is called "eye damar".

=== Gold Faturan ===
The properties found inside Faturan determine its desirability and value, the most valuable being gold, in the forms of gold leaf, dust or metal, added when molten. Gold Faturan was used for making jewelry beads, rings, and accessories. Tribal beads were used as dowry gifts and for making necklaces and other jewelry in North Africa and Asia.

=== Golden Lava Flow Faturan ===
One of the rarest and sought after Faturan types is called Golden Lava Flow Faturan. It is a very rare mixture that involves a complicated and costly method of preparing a combination of melted gold and infusing it with Faturan. As the gold is in a molten form when combined with Faturan, it gives the material a molten lava look.
