= Squishy =

Type of soft foam toy

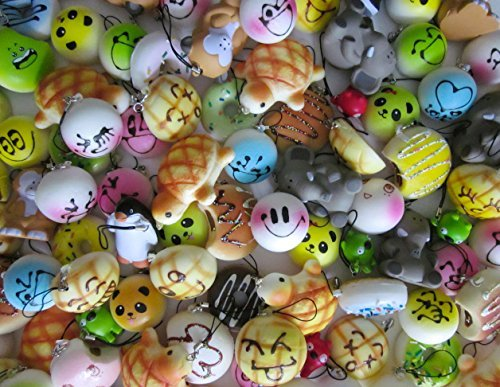
Squishy keychains.

A squishy is a type of soft toy made of a specially formulated soft polyurethane foam or thermoplastic rubber, that slowly returns to its original shape after being squeezed. Squishies are manufactured into many different shapes and sizes, such as animals, fruits, and food items. They are often scented to match the object represented. The toy is also called kawaii squishy, kawaii meaning "cute" in Japanese.

Originating in Japan, squishies became available in the US in the spring of 2017. In the following years, the toys became popular around the world.

Squishies became popular among children, orphans and adolescents, but also among adults, for the tactile pleasure that one experiences squishing them, which is said to relieve stress.

In addition to relieving stress, squishies can also enhance focus and help regulate emotions by serving as a pleasant distraction. This makes it useful and popular among those who have anxiety or ADHD.

== History ==
Squishies are a recent member of a more general class of mindless manipulation toys that includes stress balls and fidget spinners. The genre may be seen as very old, including, for example, the 16th-century cup-and-ball toy (bilboquet). Non-foamed materials can also be referred to as squishies. This might involve highly plasticized rubber or crosslinked polymers that generate squishy materials. The latter might provide a healthier alternative as it contains no small migratable molecules if prepared properly. The squishiness of the material can be controlled by controlling the crosslink density. If there are too few crosslinks, the material might remain squashed.

In the 2010s and 2020s, squishy-style toys became widely commercialized. In addition to the classic slow-rising polyurethane foam squishies, manufacturers have produced various tactile sensory toys with similar properties.

In 2026, squishies that looked like sticks of butter, or NeeDohs, made an Internet trend on TikTok and YouTube.

A Japanese toy manufacturer, BLOOM, reported that it began producing polyurethane squishies in 2002. Its early products included fruit designs such as bananas and peaches. The company later introduced squishies as large mobile-phone charms, which became popular in Japan around 2007–2009. According to a 2019 interview with the company, videos posted by overseas YouTubers attracted widespread attention from around 2014, helping introduce the toys to international audiences.

In 2018, toy manufacturer ORB reported that its Soft’n Slo Squishies product line had reached 12 million retail units sold. The company also displayed more than 400 designs at the American International Toy Fair in New York and introduced over 100 new designs at the event. These figures were reported by ORB and refer to its own product line rather than the entire squishy toy market.

== Materials and characteristics ==
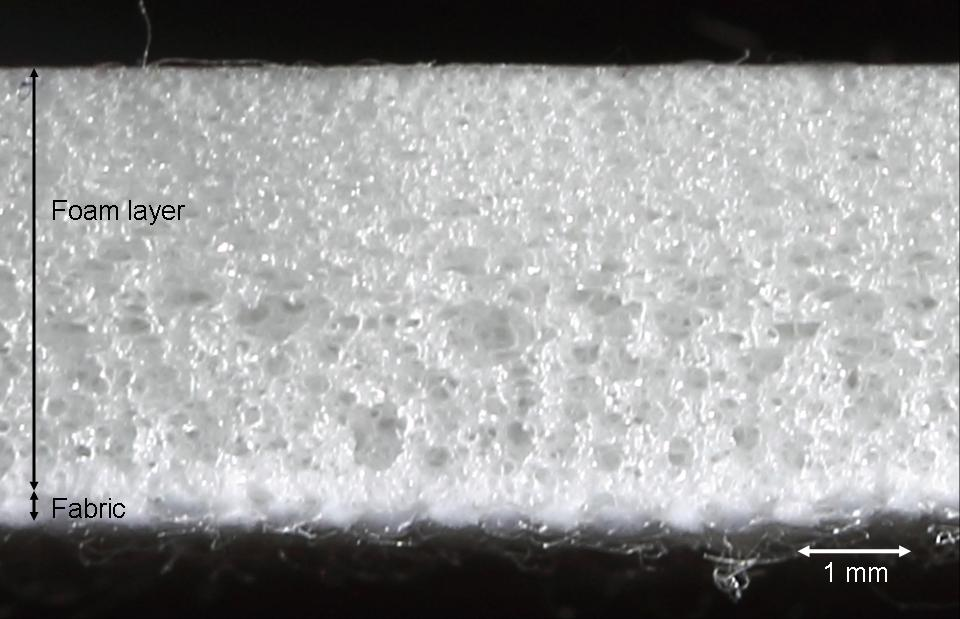
Polyurethane Foam

The material affects a squishy's softness, flexibility, and response to pressure. Many slow-rising squishies are made from modified polyurethane foam. This type of foam compresses when squeezed and gradually returns to its original shape. This property is known as slow recovery or slow-rising behavior.

Not all squishies use the same materials or construction. Some products use thermoplastic rubber (TPR), while others may use materials such as silicone. For example, Schylling, the manufacturer of NeeDoh toys, states that most of its products have a TPR outer layer and fillings such as polyvinyl alcohol (PVA) or maltose. The materials used can therefore vary between product types and manufacturers.

Squishies are manufactured in a range of designs, including food, fruit, animals, and fictional characters. Some products resemble everyday objects, while others feature bright colors and simplified shapes. Certain products also contain fragrances that resemble the objects they represent. These design and sensory features are described in an interview with the Japanese toy manufacturer BLOOM.

== Health issues ==
The Danish Environmental Protection Agency tested 12 squishy toys for the release of organic substances, including fragrances. The investigation detected substances such as N,N-dimethylformamide, fragrances, and amines. In a risk assessment involving a young child sleeping while hugging a newly unpacked squishy, all 12 tested products released unacceptably high levels of N,N-dimethylformamide, triethylenediamine, and cyclohexanone after one hour. For four toys tested again after three days, levels of N,N-dimethylformamide and triethylenediamine remained unacceptably high. The findings relate to the exposure scenarios examined in the study and should not be interpreted as evidence that all squishy toys present the same level of risk under every condition.

In 2026, Cornwall Trading Standards in southwest England warned that some liquid-filled squishies shaped like Baozi contained high levels of Benzene. These actions caused nationwide recalls.

Squishies have also been taken off the market in Norway because of their potential choking hazard and their popularity with small children between the ages of 6–12.

== Environmental impact ==
Many squishies are made from synthetic materials. Polyurethane foam, which is used in some products, can be difficult to recycle, depending on its composition and the recycling method. Research on polyurethane foam waste has examined methods for recovering or reusing the material and the challenges involved in doing so.

The environmental impact of a squishy depends on its materials, how long it is used, and how it is disposed of. Some products include coatings, fragrances, or decorative parts, but these features alone do not establish whether a particular toy can be recycled. Research specifically measuring the environmental impact of squishy toys as a product group remains limited.

== See also ==
- Kinetic sand
- Flubber (material)
- Slime (toy)
- Silly Putty
- Office toy
- Fidget Cube
- Baoding balls
- NeeDoh
