= Worry beads =

String of beads

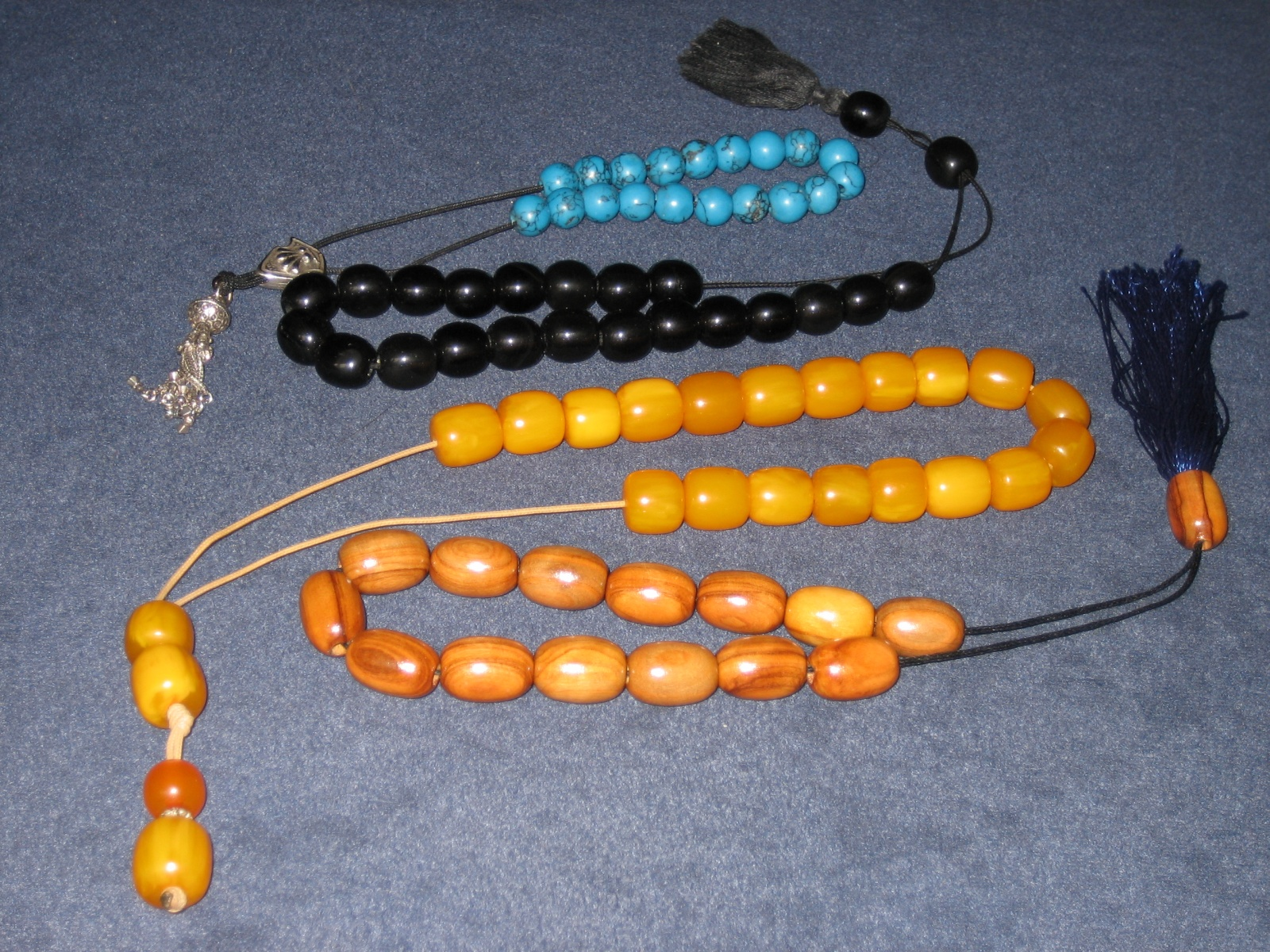
Worry beads made from different materials

Worry beads or komboloi/kompoloi (Greek: κομπολόι, IPA: [ko(m)boˈloi̯], 'bead collection'; plural: κομπολόγια, IPA: [ko(m)boˈloʝa]) is a string of beads manipulated with one or two hands and used to pass time in Greek and Cypriot culture. Unlike the similar prayer beads used in many religious traditions, worry beads have no religious or ceremonial purpose.

== Etymology ==
Modern Greek κομπολόι is derived from κομβολόγιον < κόμβος "knot" + -λόγιο "collection". It is sometimes said that it is short for the phrase σε κάθε κόμπο προσευχή λέω, "in every knot I say a prayer" (κόμπος "knot" and λέω "say"). This etymology accounts for the fact that κομπολόι evolved from κομποσκοίνι, the Greek word for prayer rope.

== Use ==
Worry beads have several uses in Greek culture, including:

- relaxation, enjoyment, and generally passing the time
- as an amulet, to guard against bad luck
- used by people who wish to limit smoking
- as a mark of power and social prestige. This is especially true in the case of expensive worry beads made of silver or amber.

Many prominent Greeks were users and collectors of worry beads, including former Prime Minister Andreas Papandreou and business magnate Aristotle Onassis.

== Features ==
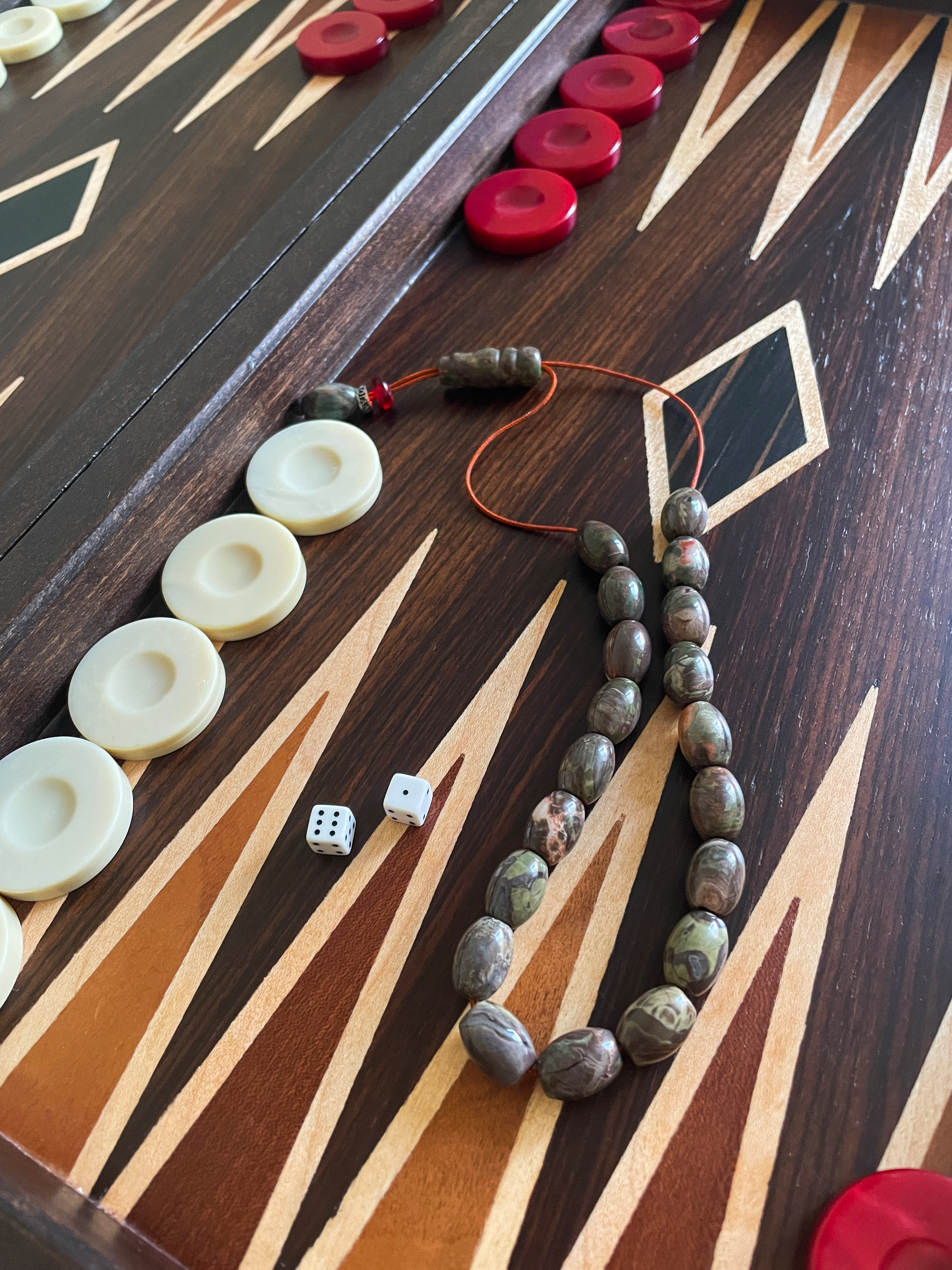
Komboloi on a tavli board

Worry beads may be constructed from any type of bead, although amber, amber resin (such as faturan), and coral are preferred, as they are thought to be more pleasant to handle than non-organic materials such as metal or minerals.

Greek worry beads generally have an odd number of beads, often one more than a multiple of four (e.g. (4×4)+1, (5×4)+1, and so on) or a prime number (usually 17, 19 or 23), and usually have a head composed of a fixed bead (παπάς "priest"), a shield (θυρεός) to separate the two threads and help the beads to flow freely, and a tassel (φούντα). Usually the length of worry beads is approximately two palm widths.

== Usage ==
Using and slinging a komboloi

Worry beads can be handled in many different ways. The most common are a quiet method, for indoors, and a noisier method that is acceptable in public places.

=== Quiet ===
"Quiet" method

The most common quiet method is to start at one end of the thread or chain, near the shield, and to pull the thread forward using that hand's thumb and the side of the index finger until one of the beads is reached. Then the cord is tipped so that the bead falls and hits the shield. This is repeated until all the beads have been tipped and then the user starts over.

=== Loud ===
"Loud" method

The second, louder, method is to divide the beads into two groups. On one end is the shield and a small number of the beads. On the other end is the rest of the beads. Where the two threads are empty, that space is laid between the index and middle fingers. The hand should be in a position where the palm is facing the torso. Then the end behind the hand is swung up and forward so that it hits the other beads, making a noise.

The threads are then switched back into the space between the index and middle fingers by holding the threads between the thumb and the side of the index finger. This is repeated rhythmically, creating a louder clicking noise than the quiet method. Another method is to hold all of the worry beads in one hand and roll them against each other, creating soft clicking sounds.

== See also ==
- Baoding balls
- Begleri
- Fidget toy
- Japamala
- Mangas
- Misbaha
- Rosary
- Stress ball
- Worry stone
