= Stress ball =

Squeezable toy meant to relieve stress

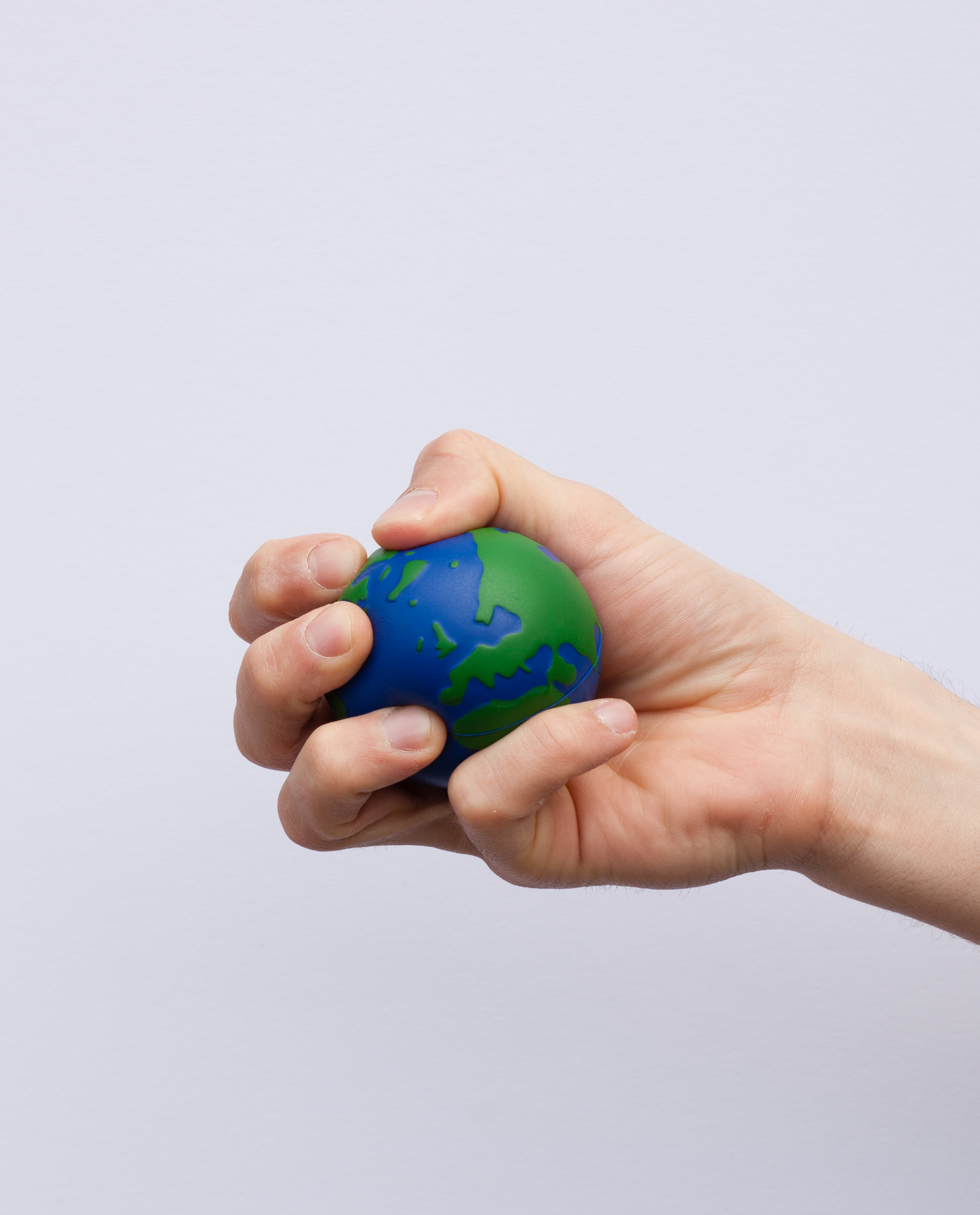
A stress ball in the shape of a globe

A stress ball or hand exercise ball is a malleable toy, usually not more than 7 centimetres (2.8 in) in diameter. It is squeezed in the hand and manipulated by the fingers, ostensibly to relieve stress and muscle tension or to exercise the muscles of the hand.

Despite the name, many stress balls are not spherical. Some are molded in amusing shapes, and pad- or transfer-printed with corporate logos. They may be presented to employees and clients of companies as promotional gifts. Because of the many non-spherical shapes now available, stress balls are commonly known as stress toys or stress relievers.

== Types ==
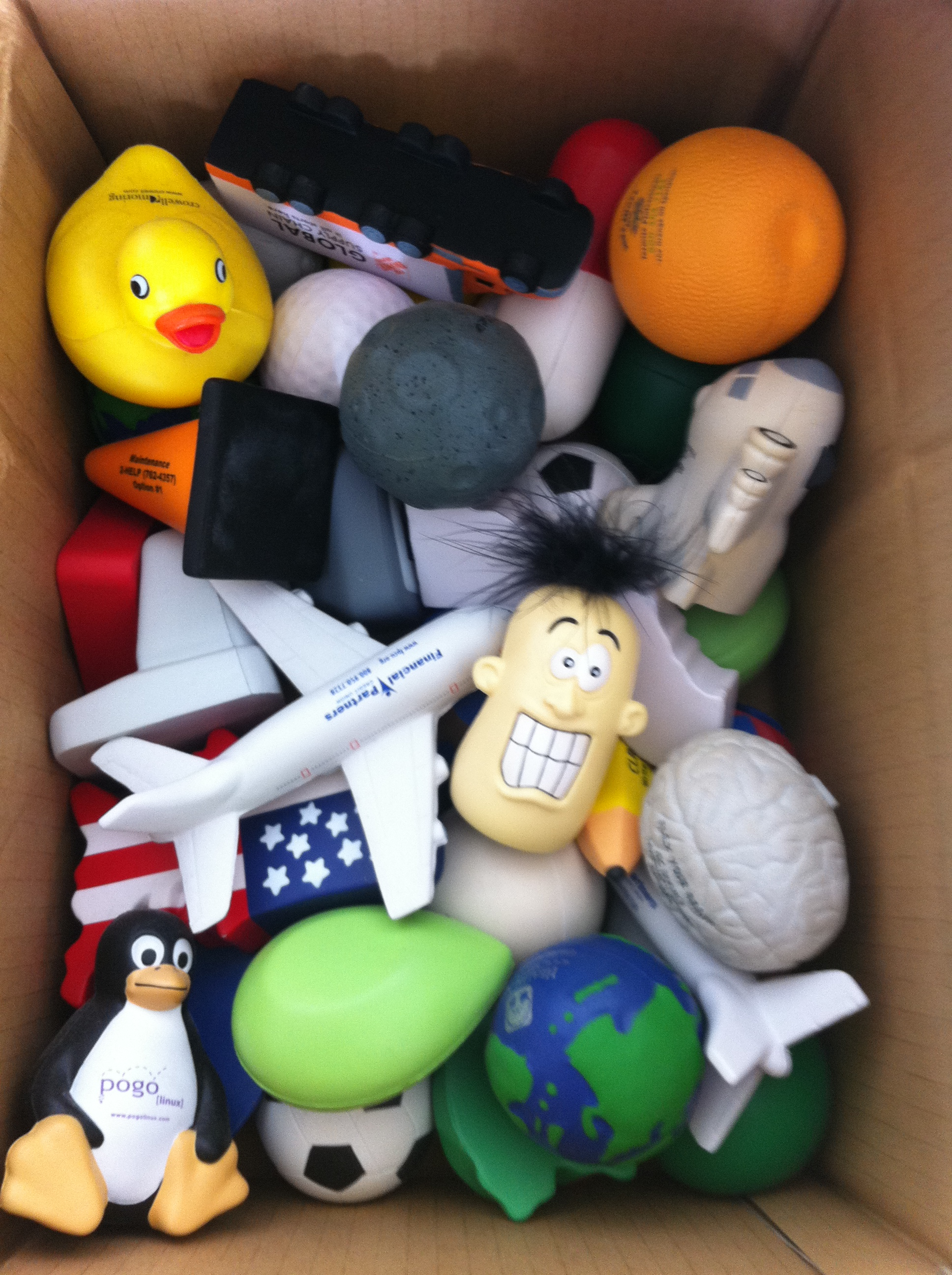
A selection of foam-rubber stress relievers

There are several types of stress balls that originate from many countries. The most common type of stress ball in America is the "bean bag" type, commonly known as a "Hacky Sack." In Australia, most common are the foam type, which prevents stress through resistance from squeezing the ball. Chinese-form balls are known as the Baoding ball; unlike others, these are not squeezable as they are solid and come in pairs, allowing users to roll them together to make a soothing sound and a smooth sensation feeling in one's hands. They come in a variety of shapes and sizes.

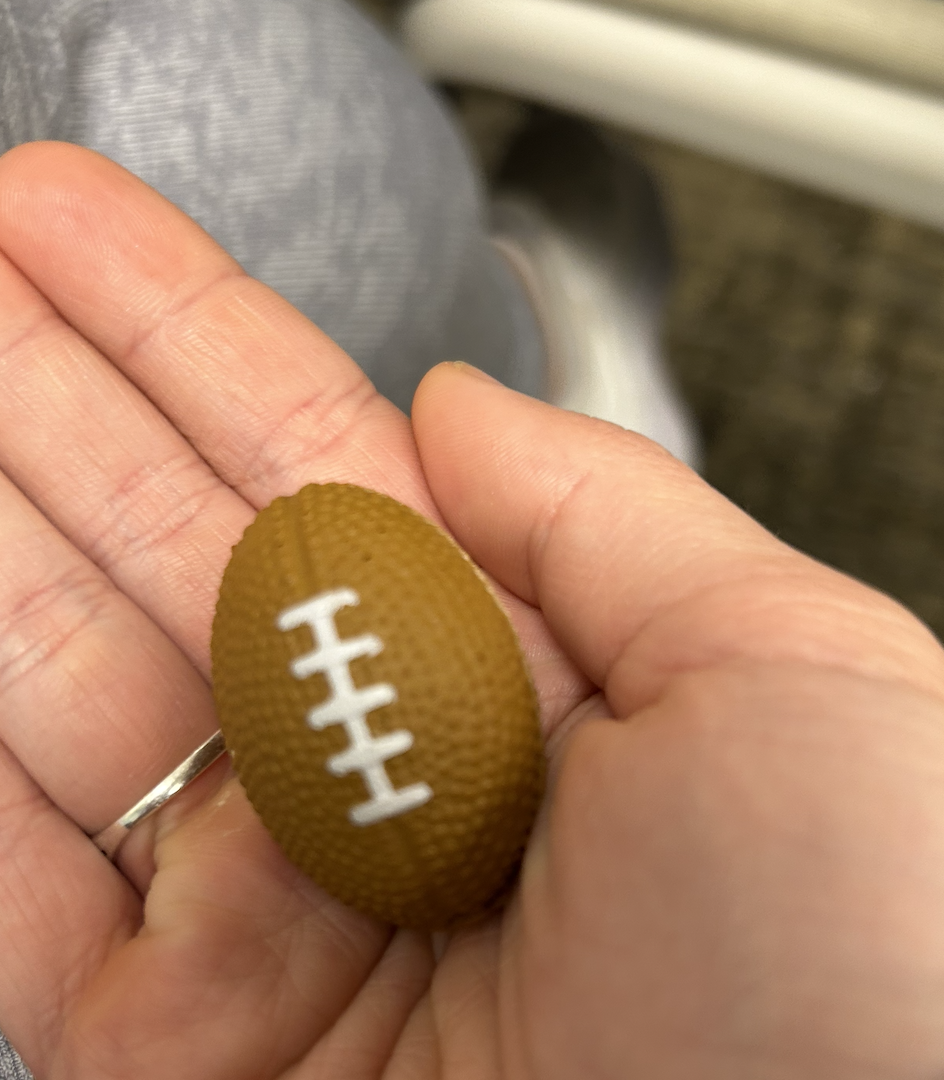
A type of stress toy in the shape of an American football

Some stress relievers are made from closed-cell polyurethane foam rubber. These are made by injecting the liquid components of the foam into a mold. The resulting chemical reaction creates carbon dioxide bubbles as a byproduct, which in turn creates the foam.

There are also mochi squishies, which are small, slightly sticky, usually shaped like cute animals or fruits/vegetables, and are made of silicone. They get their name from mochi, a Japanese dessert.

Contemporary squishy stress toys also overlap with the broader market for fidget and sensory toys. NeeDoh, a line of squeezable toys made by Schylling, is a prominent commercial example: ABC News described NeeDohs as handheld sensory toys that can be stretched and squeezed and contain non-toxic, dough-like compounds, while Business Insider described them as colorful rubbery balls and cubes with varying textures. Along with NeeDohs, there are also butter squishies that also act like NeeDohs, just in the shape of butter.

== See also ==
- Fidget spinner
- Fidget Cube
- Worry beads
- Worry stone
- Natasha doll
- Squishies
- Pop it (toy)
- Grippers
- NeeDoh
