= Baoding balls =

Chinese handheld exercise balls

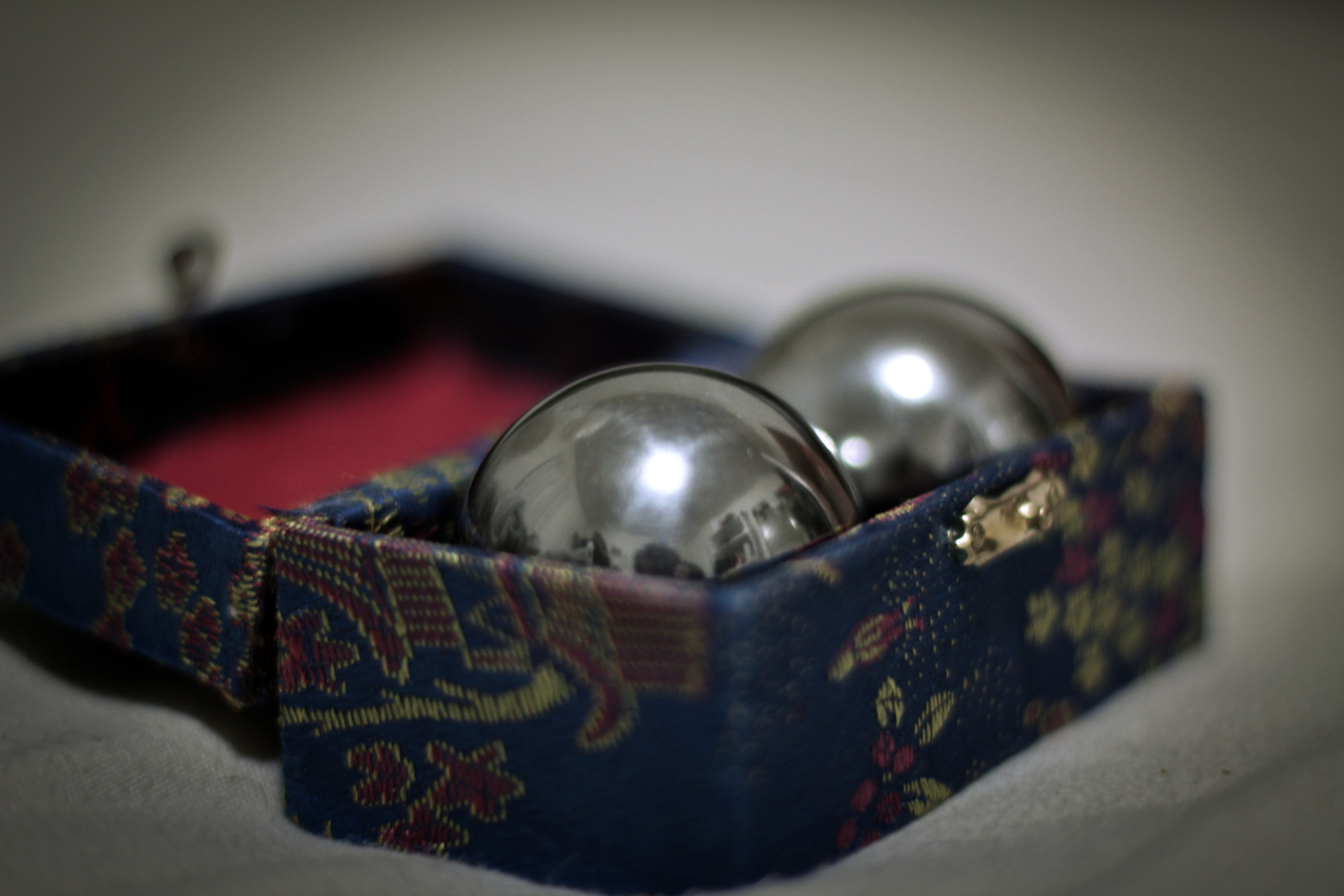
Steel Baoding balls in a box

Baoding balls (Chinese: 保定健身球; pinyin: Bǎodìng Jiànshēn Qiú; Wade–Giles: Pao^{3}-ting^{4} Chien^{4}-sheng^{1} Ch'iu^{2}) are metal balls small enough to hold in one hand, used for physical exercise and therapy. They are also known as Chinese exercise balls, Chinese health balls, Chinese meditation balls, and Chinese medicine balls. Baoding balls are used by rotating two or more balls repeatedly in the hand. Intended to improve finger dexterity, relax the hand, or aid in the recovery of muscle strength and motor skills after surgery, Baoding balls work similarly to Western stress balls.

== History ==
Baoding balls were named after the city of Baoding in the province of Hebei, China, during the Ming dynasty. Construction methods varied. Formerly, they were usually called "iron balls", as they were originally made of iron. As metalworking advanced, "iron balls" became more popular. Baoding balls continue to be produced there.

== Composition ==
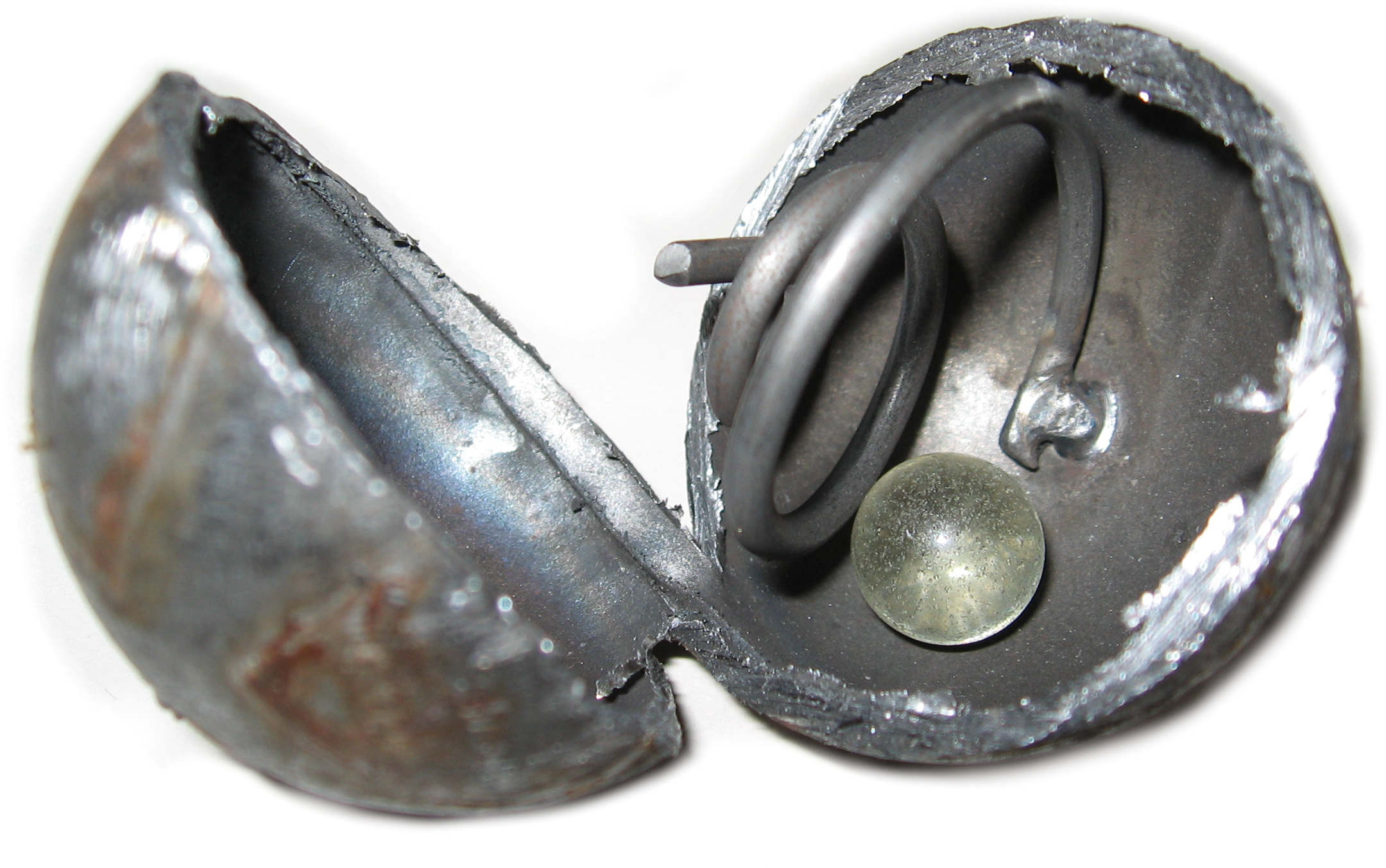
Inside Baoding balls: a wire and a marble

Most Baoding balls consist of a pair of hollow spheres, each containing a chime that rings when an inner ball strikes the outer sphere. Many modern examples are decorated with cloisonné and brass wire; these are essentially decorative since they easily chip when dropped or rubbed together. Baoding balls can also be made of solid jade, agate, marble, and other types of stone.

Hollow balls are generally more suitable for therapeutic use due to their lighter weight. Heavier balls of iron, steel or tungsten carbide require more effort for rotation. These are mainly used to build strength by resistance training.

== Use ==
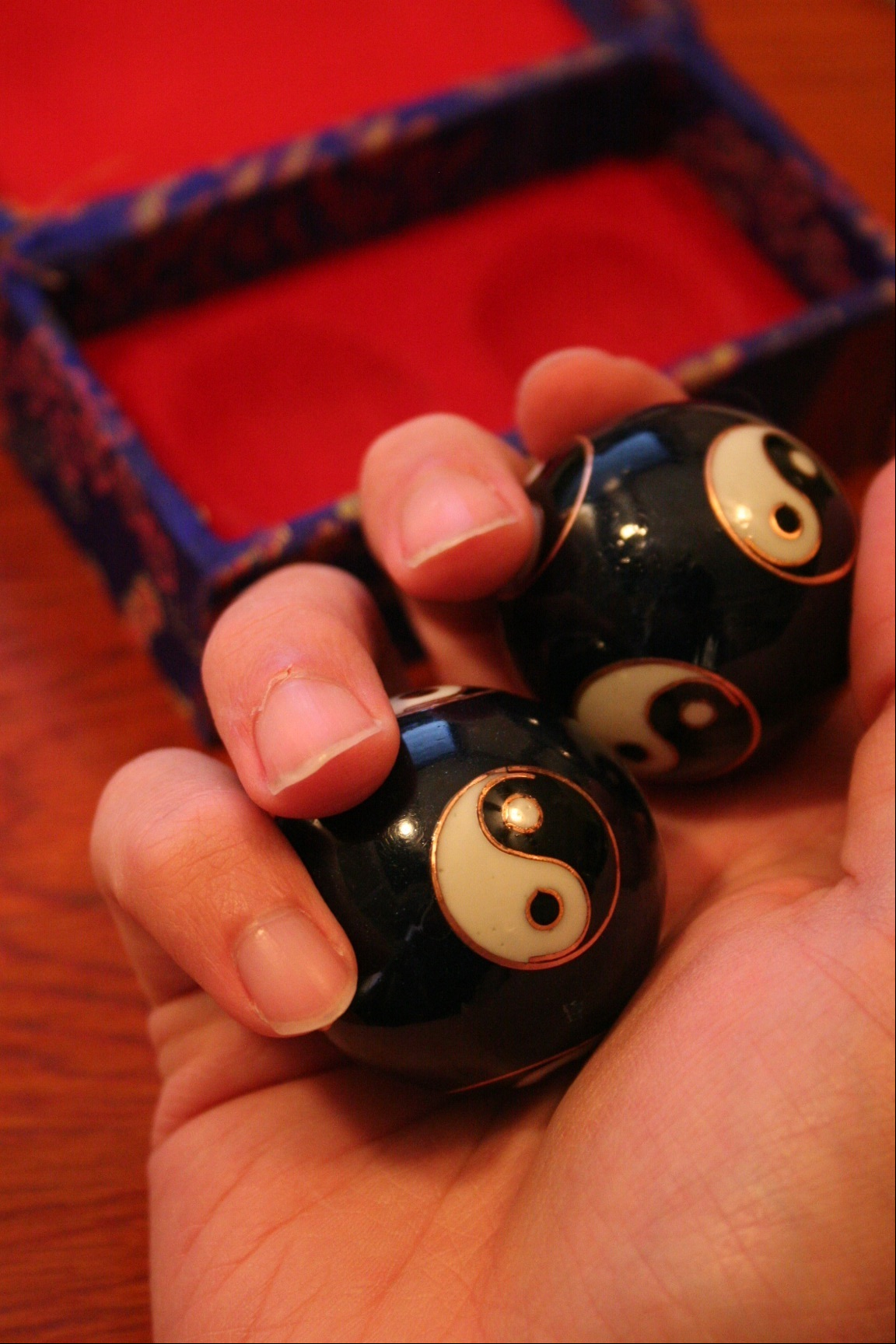
Baoding balls in use

The basic exercise consists of holding a pair of Baoding balls in the palm of one hand, rotating them (switching the relative position of the two balls) while maintaining constant contact between them. Once this technique has been mastered, the rotation speed can be gradually increased until the balls separate in the hand. Eventually one hand can learn to rotate them completely without the balls making contact with each other. Exercises have been developed involving more balls, where the main technique is to avoid contact with the other balls. This requires using a finger, usually the index finger, as a divider.

An average user should be able to start with a 45 mm (1.8 in) ball and move up to 60 mm (2.4 in) as their muscles get accustomed to the exercise. Larger Baoding balls between 70 and 100 mm (2.8 and 3.9 in) can be used. Keeping larger balls separate while rotating them is an advanced skill. The area of the hand exercised can be varied, altering the part of the hand they rotate over, or changing the orbit of the balls so that more force is exerted on a particular finger or finger joints.

=== In popular culture and film ===
Baoding balls feature prominently as an item used to relieve tension and anxiety by the character Furious Styles, a father figure played by Laurence Fishburne in the 1991 film Boyz n the Hood.

Other films and television shows to have featured Baoding balls include: Extraction (2020), The Adventurers (2017), Agents of S.H.I.E.L.D (2017), Tron: Legacy (2010), Open Season 3 (2010), and The Caine Mutiny (1954).

== As exercise ==
Baoding balls are often used in physical therapy and occupational therapy to exercise the soft tissues of the hand, wrist, and arm, such as after surgery to the hand. They are sometimes recommended for treating traumatic stress in children and adolescents.

Well-known strongmen such as John Brookfield used shot put balls as Baoding balls, rotating them to develop forearm muscles and improve their grip.

== Alternative medicine ==
Proponents of alternative medicine claim that baoding balls can improve brain function and reduce stress by stimulating the acupuncture points on the hand.

== See also ==
- Exercise ball
- Worry beads
- Worry stone
- Stress ball
- Fidget toy
- Begleri
