= Bakelite =

First synthetic plastic

Identifiers
CAS Number	9003-35-4
3D model (JSmol)	Interactive image
ChemSpider	none
- SMILES: Oc0ccccc0Cc0cc(C1)c(O)c(c0)Cc0c(O)ccc(c0)Cc0ccc(O)c(c0)Cc0c(O)ccc(c0)Cc0c(O)ccc(c0)Cc0c(O)c(C2)cc(c0)Cc0c(O)ccc(c0)Cc(c0O)cc2cc0Cc0cc(Cc2ccc(O)cc2)c(O)c(c0)Cc0c(O)ccc(c0)C1

Properties
Chemical formula	(C_{6}H_{6}O·CH_{2}O)_{n}
Molar mass	Variable
Appearance	Brown solid
Density	1.3 g/cm^{3}
Thermal conductivity	0.2 W/(m·K)
Refractive index (n_{D})	1.63

Thermochemistry
Heat capacity (C)	0.92 kJ/(kg·K)
- Except where otherwise noted, data are given for materials in their standard state (at 25 °C [77 °F], 100 kPa). Infobox references

Bakelite (/ˈbeɪkəlaɪt/ BAY-kə-lyte) is the first plastic made from synthetic components. It was developed by chemist Leo Baekeland in Yonkers, New York, in 1907, and patented on December 7, 1909.

After its invention, Bakelite became a commercial success because it could be molded into any shape. It has been used for such diverse products as kitchenware, jewelry, pipe stems, children's toys, and firearms. Because Bakelite is heat-resistant and electrically nonconductive, it has also been used to make products such as electrical insulators and casings for radios and telephones.

The creation of a synthetic plastic was revolutionary for the chemical industry, which at the time was mostly focused on cloth dyes and explosives. Bakelite's commercial success led to other synthetic plastics. As the world's first commercial synthetic plastic, Bakelite was named a National Historic Chemical Landmark by the American Chemical Society.

Formally, Bakelite is polyoxybenzylmethyleneglycolanhydride, a thermosetting phenol formaldehyde resin, formed from a condensation reaction of phenol with formaldehyde.

The retro appeal of old Bakelite products has made them collectible.

== History ==
The reaction between phenol and aldehyde was first reported in 1872 by Adolf von Baeyer, though its use as a commercial product was not considered at the time.

Leo Baekeland was already wealthy after selling the rights to his Velox photographic paper to Eastman Kodak in 1899 for $750,000, of which he personally netted about $215,000, when he began to investigate the reactions of phenol and formaldehyde in his home laboratory. Chemists had begun to recognize that many natural resins and fibers were polymers. Baekeland's initial intent was to find a replacement for shellac, a material in limited supply because it was made naturally from the secretion of lac insects (specifically Kerria lacca). He produced a soluble phenol-formaldehyde shellac called Novolak, but it was not a market success, even though it is still used to this day (e.g., as a photoresist).

He then began experimenting on strengthening wood by impregnating it with a synthetic resin rather than coating it. By controlling the pressure and temperature applied to phenol and formaldehyde, he produced a hard moldable material that he named Bakelite, after himself and the heat curing process it required. It was the first synthetic thermosetting plastic produced, and Baekeland speculated on "the thousand and one … articles" it could be used to make. He considered the possibilities of using a wide variety of filling materials, including cotton, powdered bronze, and slate dust, but was most successful with wood and asbestos fibers, though asbestos was gradually abandoned by all manufacturers in the latter quarter of the 20th century due to stricter environmental laws.

Baekeland filed a substantial number of related patents. Bakelite, his "method of making insoluble products of phenol and formaldehyde", was filed on July 13, 1907, and granted on December 7, 1909. He also filed for patent protection in other countries, including Belgium, Canada, Denmark, Hungary, Japan, Mexico, Russia, and Spain. He announced his invention at a meeting of the American Chemical Society on February 5, 1909.

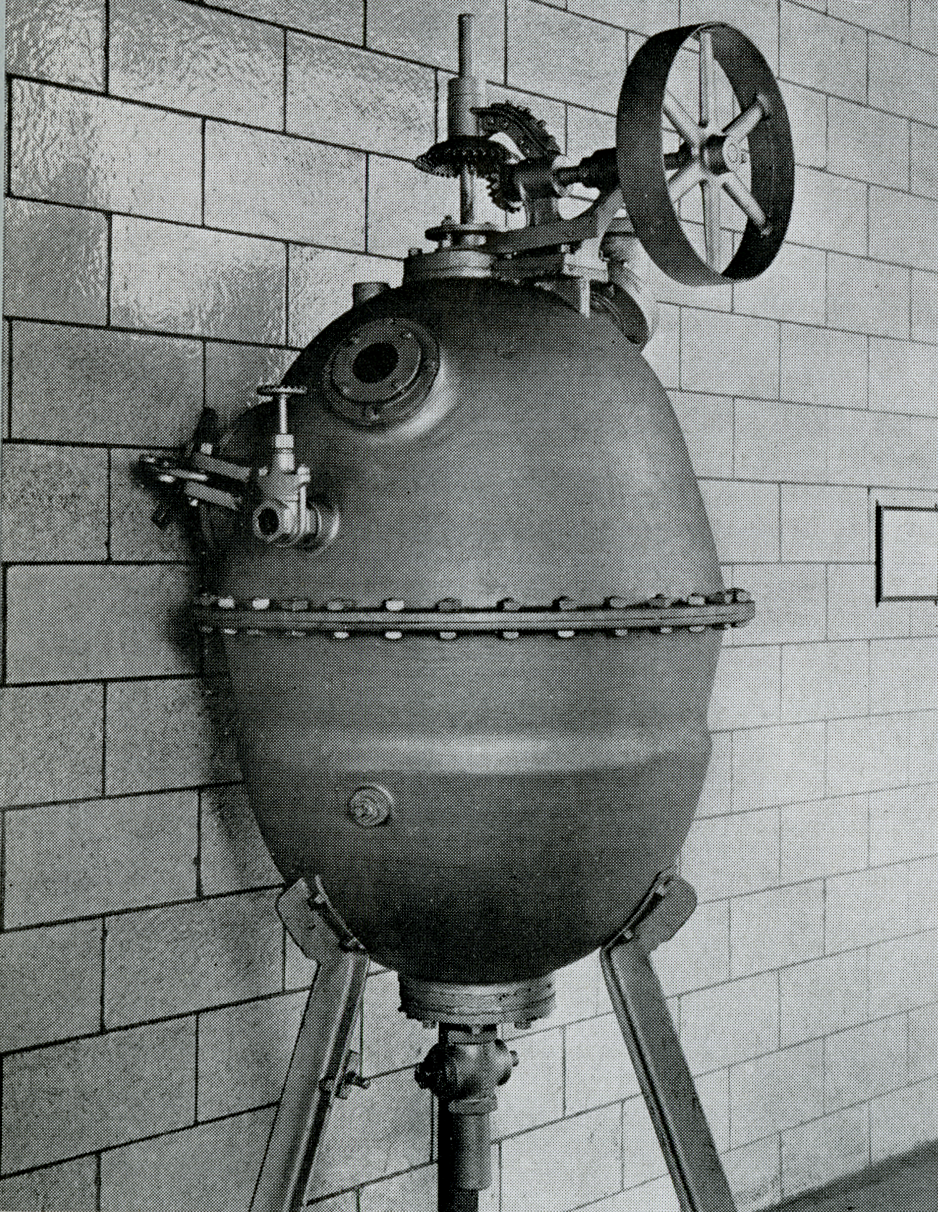
The first semi-commercial Bakelizer, from Baekeland's laboratory, 1935

Baekeland started semi-commercial production of his new material in his home laboratory, marketing it as a material for electrical insulators. In the summer of 1909, he licensed the continental European rights to Rütger AG. The subsidiary formed at that time, Bakelite AG, was the first to produce Bakelite on an industrial scale.

By 1910, Baekeland was producing enough material in the US to justify expansion. He formed the General Bakelite Company of Perth Amboy, New Jersey, as a U.S. company to manufacture and market his new industrial material, and made overseas connections to produce it in other countries.

The Bakelite Company produced "transparent" cast resin (which did not include filler) for a small market during the 1910s and 1920s. Blocks or rods of cast resin, also known as "artificial amber", were machined and carved to create items such as pipe stems, cigarette holders, and jewelry. However, the demand for molded plastics led the company to concentrate on molding rather than cast solid resins.

The Bakelite Corporation was formed in 1922 after patent litigation favorable to Baekeland, from a merger of three companies: Baekeland's General Bakelite Company; the Condensite Company, founded by J. W. Aylesworth; and the Redmanol Chemical Products Company, founded by Lawrence V. Redman. Under director of advertising and public relations Allan Brown, who came to Bakelite from Condensite, Bakelite was aggressively marketed as "the material of a thousand uses". A filing for a trademark featuring the letter B above the infinity symbol was made August 25, 1925, and claimed the mark was in use as of December 1, 1924. A wide variety of uses were listed in their trademark applications.

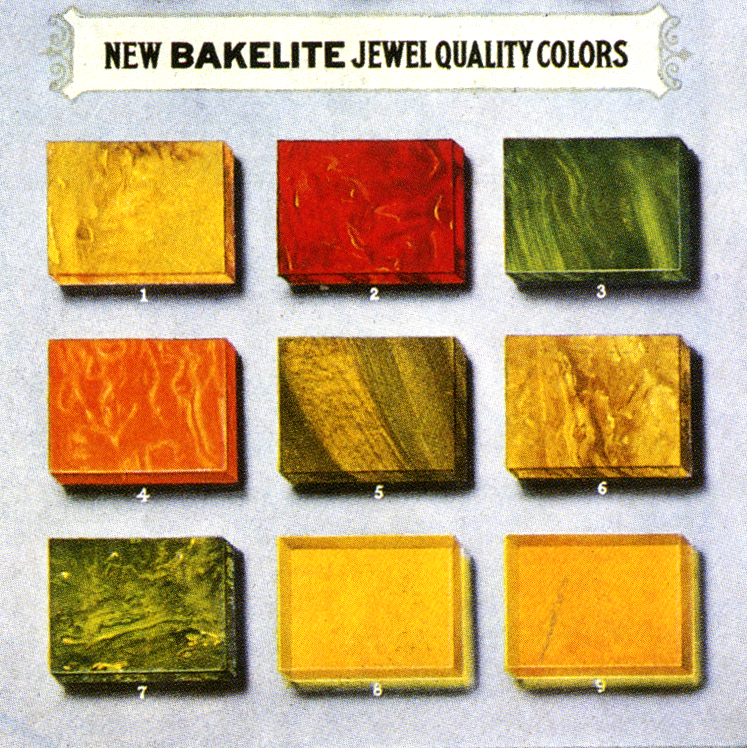
Color chart for Bakelite "jewel" quality colors (cast resin or "Clear Material"), 1924

The first issue of Plastics magazine, October 1925, featured Bakelite on its cover and included the article "Bakelite – What It Is" by Allan Brown. The range of colors that were available included "black, brown, red, yellow, green, gray, blue, and blends of two or more of these". The article emphasized that Bakelite came in various forms.

Bakelite is manufactured in several forms to suit varying requirements. In all these forms the fundamental basis is the initial Bakelite resin. This variety includes clear material, for jewelry, smokers' articles, etc.; cement, for sealing electric light bulbs in metal bases; varnishes, for impregnating electric coils, etc.; lacquers, for protecting the surface of hardware; enamels, for giving resistive coating to industrial equipment; Laminated Bakelite, used for silent gears and insulation; and molding material, from which are formed innumerable articles of utility and beauty. The molding material is prepared ordinarily by the impregnation of cellulose substances with the initial "uncured" resin.

In a 1925 report, the United States Tariff Commission hailed the commercial manufacture of synthetic phenolic resin as "distinctly an American achievement", and noted that "the publication of figures, however, would be a virtual disclosure of the production of an individual company".

In the UK, Bakelite Limited, a merger of three British phenol formaldehyde resin suppliers (Damard Lacquer Company Limited of Birmingham, Mouldensite Limited of Darley Dale and Redmanol Chemical Products Company of London), was formed in 1926. A new Bakelite factory opened in Tyseley, Birmingham, around 1928. It was the "heart of Bakelite production in the UK" until it closed in 1987.

A factory to produce phenolic resins and precursors opened in Bound Brook, New Jersey, in 1931.

In 1939, the companies were acquired by Union Carbide and Carbon Corporation.

In 2005, German Bakelite manufacturer Bakelite AG was acquired by Borden Chemical of Columbus, Ohio, now Hexion Inc.

In addition to the original Bakelite material, these companies eventually made a wide range of other products, many of which were marketed under the brand name "Bakelite plastics". These included other types of cast phenolic resins similar to Catalin, and urea-formaldehyde resins, which could be made in brighter colors than polyoxybenzylmethylenglycolanhydride.

Once Baekeland's heat and pressure patents expired in 1927, Bakelite Corporation faced serious competition from other companies. Because molded Bakelite incorporated fillers to give it strength, it tended to be made in concealing dark colors. In 1927, beads, bangles, and earrings were produced by the Catalin company, through a different process which enabled them to introduce 15 new colors. Translucent jewelry, poker chips and other items made of phenolic resins were introduced in the 1930s or 1940s by the Catalin company under the Prystal name. The creation of marbled phenolic resins may also be attributable to the Catalin company.

== Synthesis ==
External videos
- "Making Bakelite Plastic", NileRed

Making Bakelite is a multi-stage process. It begins with the heating of phenol and formaldehyde in the presence of a catalyst such as hydrochloric acid, zinc chloride, or the base ammonia. This creates a liquid condensation product, referred to as Bakelite A, which is soluble in alcohol, acetone, or additional phenol. Heated further, the product becomes partially soluble and can still be softened by heat. Sustained heating results in an "insoluble hard gum". However, the high temperatures required to create this tend to cause violent foaming of the mixture when done at standard atmospheric pressure, which results in the cooled material being porous and breakable. Baekeland's innovative step was to put his "last condensation product" into an egg-shaped "Bakelizer". By heating it under pressure, at about 150 °C (302 °F), Baekeland was able to suppress the foaming that would otherwise occur. The resulting substance is extremely hard and both infusible and insoluble.

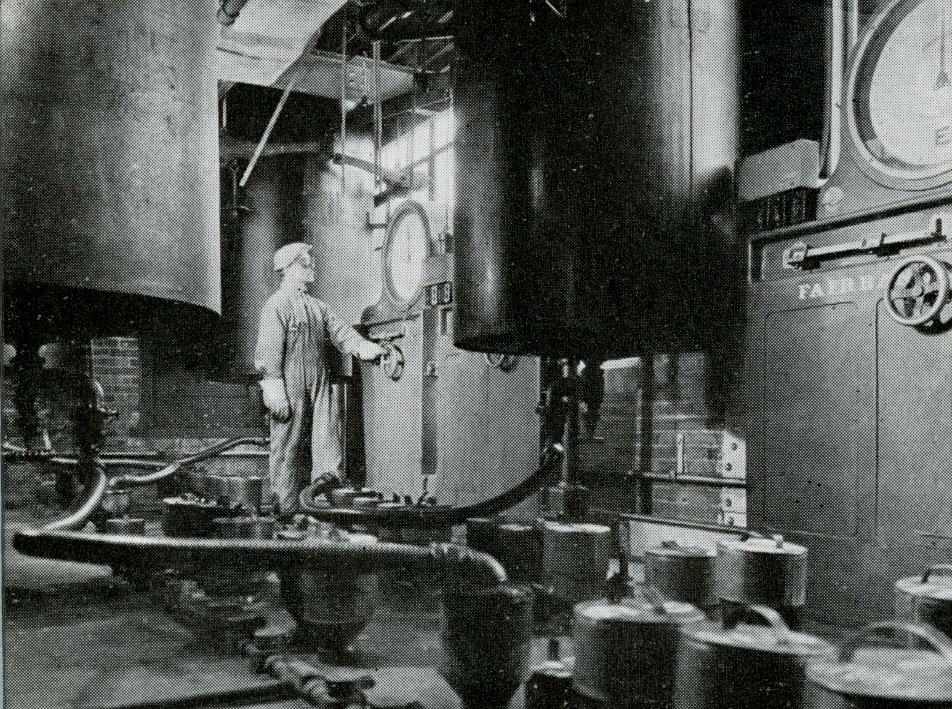
Weigh room

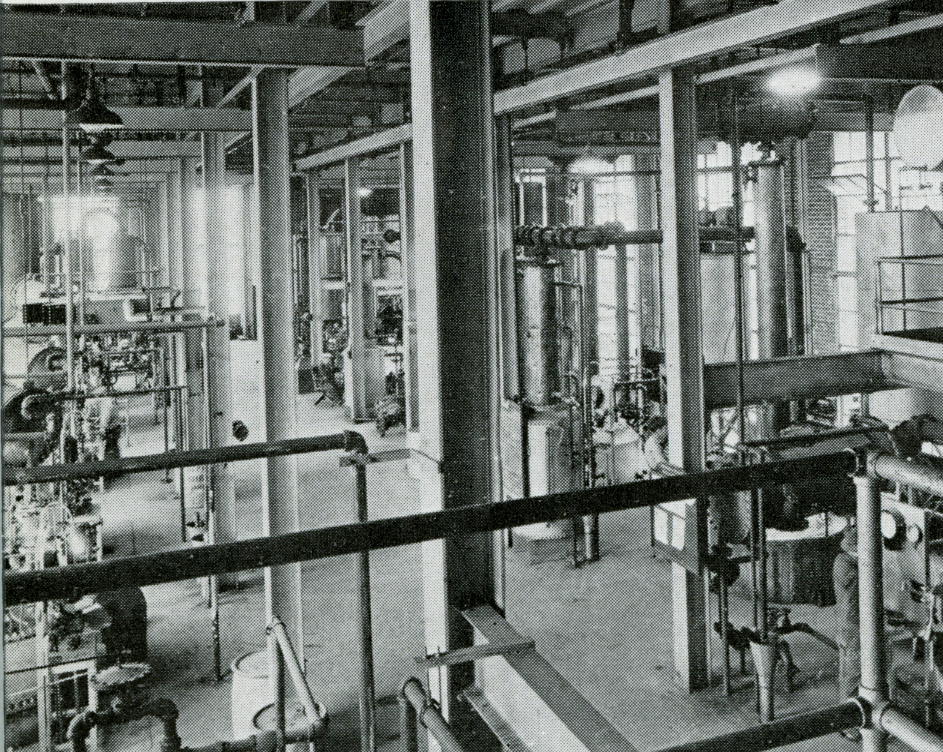
Still room

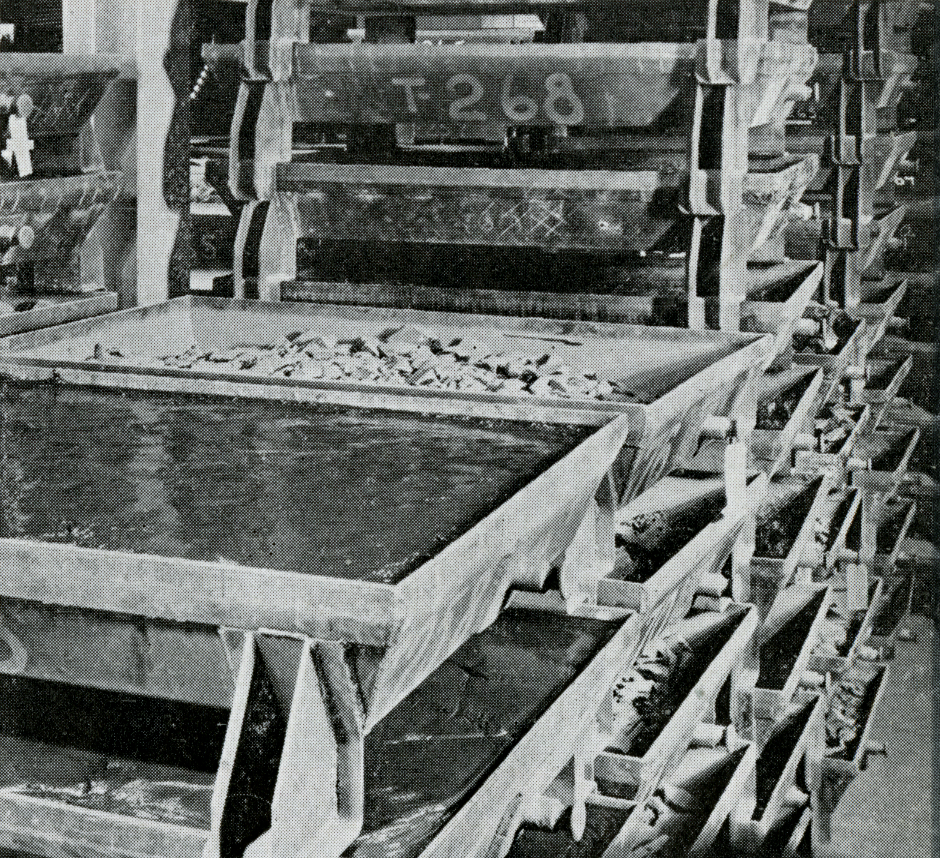
Cooling room

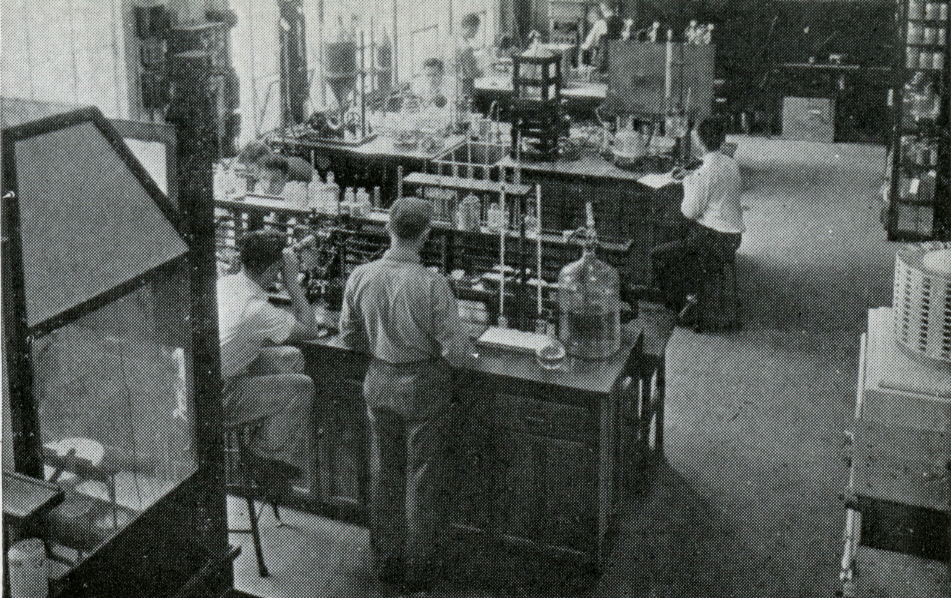
Resin and varnish inspection laboratory

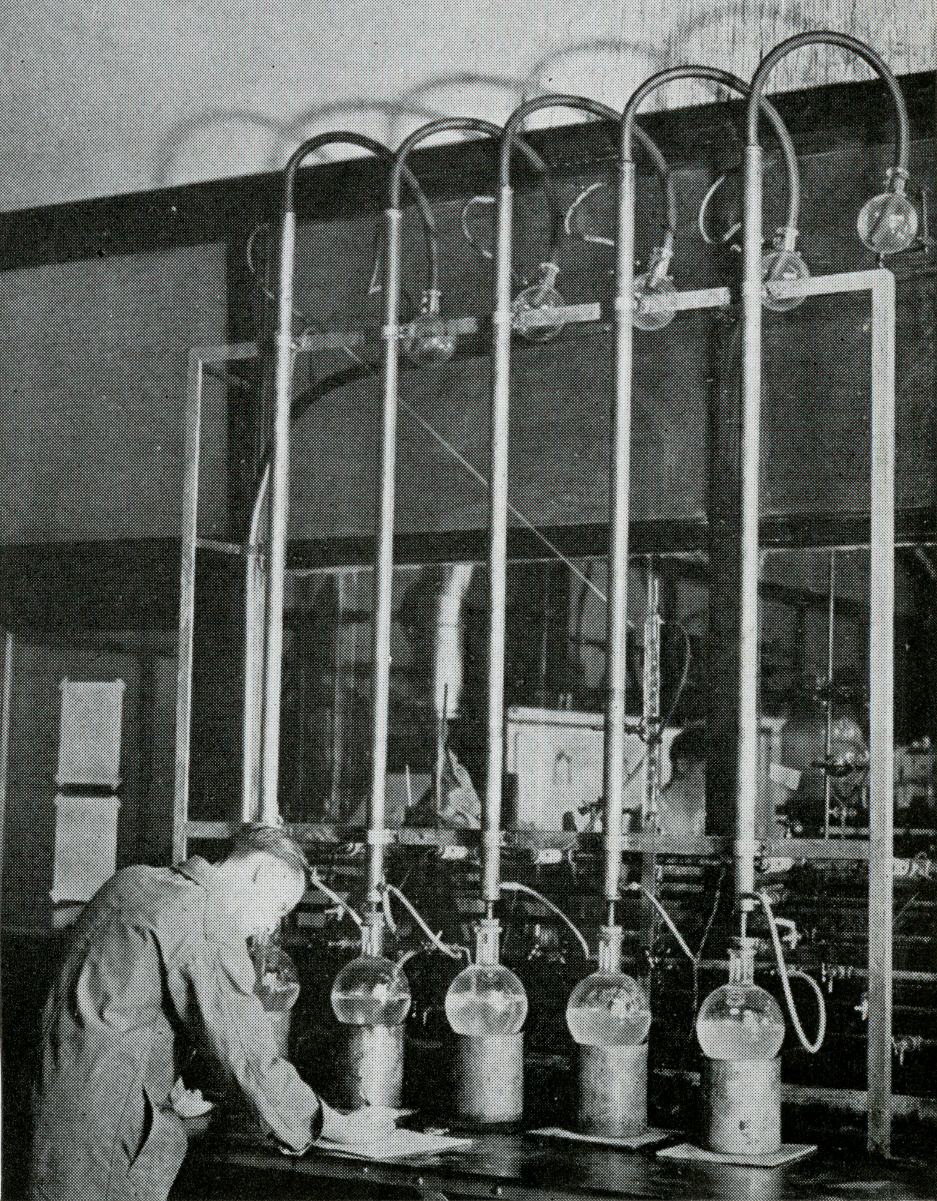
Testing resin samples

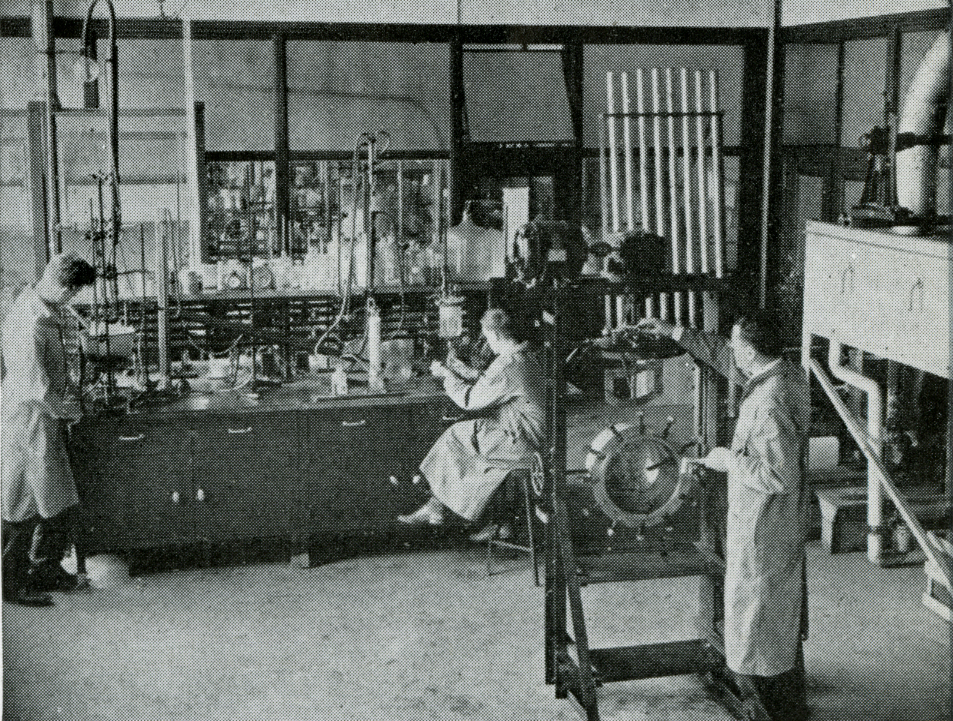
Development laboratory

=== Compression molding ===
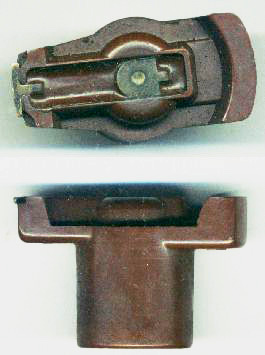
A combustion engine's spark distributor rotor made of Bakelite

Molded Bakelite forms in a condensation reaction of phenol and formaldehyde, with wood flour or asbestos fiber as a filler, under high pressure and heat in a time frame of a few minutes of curing. The result is a hard plastic material. Asbestos was gradually abandoned as filler because many countries banned the production of asbestos.

Bakelite's molding process had a number of advantages. Bakelite resin could be provided either as powder or as preformed partially cured slugs, increasing the speed of the casting. Thermosetting resins such as Bakelite required heat and pressure during the molding cycle but could be removed from the molding process without being cooled, again making the molding process faster. Also, because of the smooth polished surface that resulted, Bakelite objects required less finishing. Millions of parts could be duplicated quickly and relatively cheaply.

=== Phenolic sheet ===
Another market for Bakelite resin was the creation of phenolic sheet materials. A phenolic sheet is a hard, dense material made by applying heat and pressure to layers of paper or glass cloth impregnated with synthetic resin. Paper, cotton fabrics, synthetic fabrics, glass fabrics, and unwoven fabrics are all possible materials used in lamination. When heat and pressure are applied, polymerization transforms the layers into thermosetting industrial laminated plastic.

Bakelite phenolic sheet is produced in many commercial grades and with various additives to meet diverse mechanical, electrical, and thermal requirements. Some common types include:

- Paper reinforced NEMA XX per MIL-I-24768 PBG. Normal electrical applications, moderate mechanical strength, continuous operating temperature of 250 °F (121 °C).
- Canvas-reinforced NEMA C per MIL-I-24768 TYPE FBM NEMA CE per MIL-I-24768 TYPE FBG. Good mechanical and impact strength with a continuous operating temperature of 250 °F (121 °C).
- Linen-reinforced NEMA L per MIL-I-24768 TYPE FBI NEMA LE per MIL-I-24768 TYPE FEI. Good mechanical and electrical strength. Recommended for intricate high-strength parts. Continuous operating temperature 250 °F (121 °C).
- Nylon reinforced NEMA N-1 per MIL-I-24768 TYPE NPG. Superior electrical properties under humid conditions, fungus resistant, continuous operating temperature of 160 °F (71 °C).

== Properties ==
Bakelite has a number of important properties. It can be molded very quickly, decreasing production time. Moldings are smooth, retain their shape, and are resistant to heat, scratches, and destructive solvents. It is also resistant to electricity, and prized for its low conductivity. It is not flexible.

Phenolic resin products may swell slightly under conditions of extreme humidity or perpetual dampness. When rubbed or burnt, Bakelite has a distinctive, acrid, sickly-sweet or fishy odor.

== Applications ==
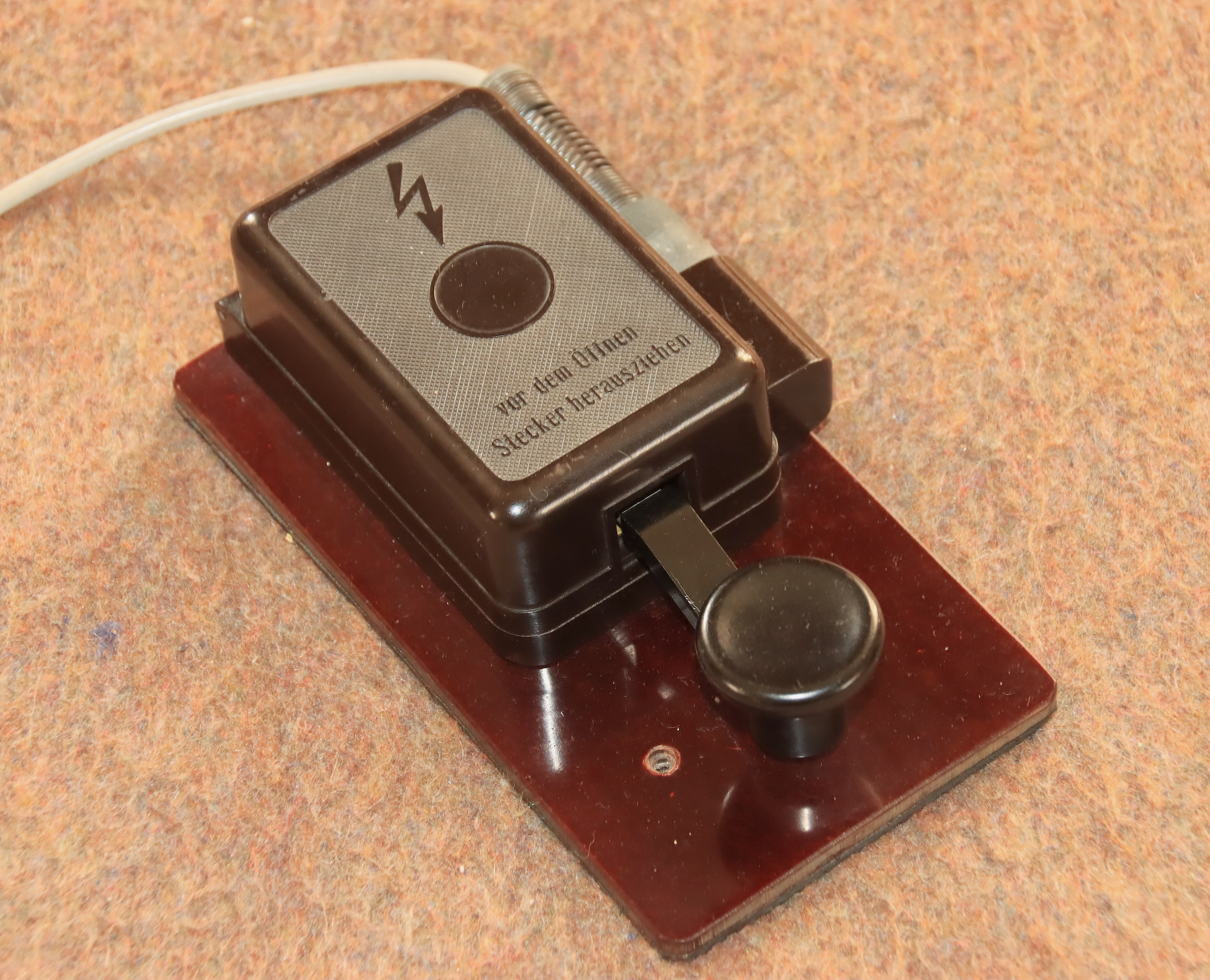
Bakelite cover of a German telegraph key

The characteristics of Bakelite made it particularly suitable as a molding compound, an adhesive or binding agent, a varnish, and a protective coating, as well as for the emerging electrical and automobile industries because of its extraordinarily high resistance to electricity, heat, and chemical action.

The earliest commercial use of Bakelite in the electrical industry was the molding of tiny insulating bushings, made in 1908 for the Weston Electrical Instrument Corporation by Richard W. Seabury of the Boonton Rubber Company. Bakelite was soon used for non-conducting parts of telephones, radios, and other electrical devices, including bases and sockets for light bulbs and electron tubes (vacuum tubes), supports for any type of electrical components, automobile distributor caps, and other insulators. By 1912, it was being used to make billiard balls, since its elasticity and the sound it made were similar to ivory.

During World War I, Bakelite was used widely, particularly in electrical systems. Important projects included the Liberty airplane engine, the wireless telephone and radio phone, and the use of micarta-bakelite propellers in the NBS-1 bomber and the DH-4B aeroplane.

Bakelite's availability and ease and speed of molding helped to lower the costs and increase product availability so that telephones and radios became common household consumer goods. It was also very important to the developing automobile industry. It was soon found in myriad other consumer products ranging from pipe stems and buttons to saxophone mouthpieces, cameras, early machine guns, and appliance casings. Bakelite was also very commonly used in the pistol grip, hand guard, and buttstock of firearms. Also magazines for Kalashnikov rifles - though components of the AKM, and some early AK-74 rifles are frequently mistakenly identified as using Bakelite, but most were made with AG-4S. Other uses through the first half of the 20th century include knife handles and "scales".

Beginning in the 1920s, it became a popular material for jewelry. Designer Coco Chanel included Bakelite bracelets in her costume jewelry collections. Designers such as Elsa Schiaparelli used it for jewelry and also for specially designed dress buttons. Later, Diana Vreeland, editor of Vogue, was enthusiastic about Bakelite. Bakelite was also used to make presentation boxes for Breitling watches.

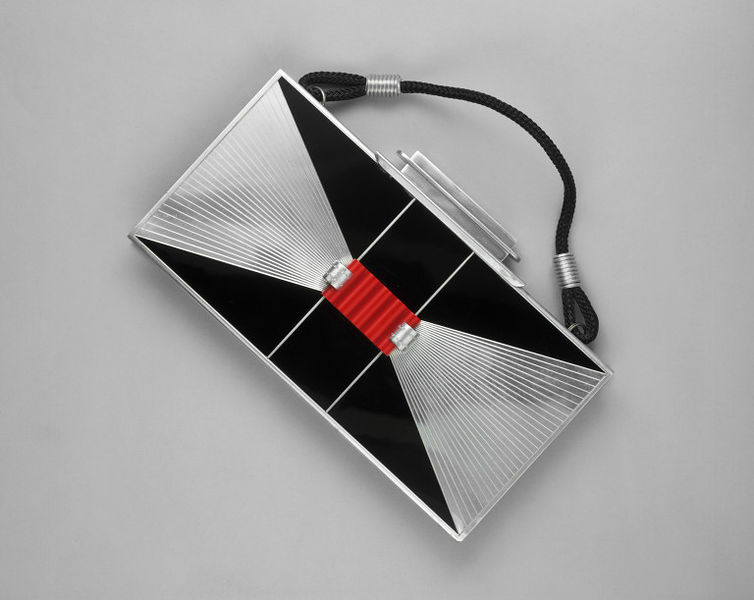
Handbag made of textured aluminium and bakelite, 1925, collection of the Victoria and Albert Museum

By 1930, designer Paul T. Frankl considered Bakelite a "Materia Nova", "expressive of our own age". By the 1930s, Bakelite was used for game pieces like chess pieces, poker chips, dominoes, and mahjong sets. Kitchenware made with Bakelite, including canisters and tableware, was promoted for its resistance to heat and to chipping. In the mid-1930s, Northland marketed a line of skis with a black "Ebonite" base, a coating of Bakelite. By 1935, it was used in solid-body electric guitars. Performers such as Jerry Byrd loved the tone of Bakelite guitars but found them difficult to keep in tune.

Charles Plimpton patented BAYKO in 1933 and rushed out his first construction sets for Christmas 1934. He called the toy Bayko Light Constructional Sets, the words "Bayko Light" being a pun on the word "Bakelite".

During World War II, Bakelite was used in a variety of wartime equipment including pilots' goggles and field telephones. It was also used for patriotic wartime jewelry. In 1943, the thermosetting phenolic resin was even considered for the manufacture of coins, due to a shortage of traditional material. Bakelite and other non-metal materials were tested for usage for the one cent coin in the US before the Mint settled on zinc-coated steel.

During World War II, Bakelite buttons were part of British uniforms. These included brown buttons for the Army and black buttons for the RAF.

In 1947, Dutch art forger Han van Meegeren was convicted of forgery, after chemist and curator Paul B. Coremans proved that a purported Vermeer contained Bakelite, which van Meegeren had used as a paint hardener.

By the late 1940s, newer materials were superseding Bakelite in many areas. Phenolics are less frequently used in general consumer products today due to their cost and complexity of production, and brittle nature. They still appear in some applications where their specific properties are required, such as small precision-shaped components, molded disc brake cylinders, saucepan handles, electrical plugs, switches and parts for electrical irons, printed circuit boards, as well as in the area of inexpensive board and tabletop games produced in China, Hong Kong, and India. Items such as billiard balls, dominoes and pieces for board games such as chess, checkers, and backgammon are constructed of Bakelite for its look, durability, fine polish, weight, and sound. Common dice are sometimes made of Bakelite for weight and sound, but the majority are made of a thermoplastic polymer such as acrylonitrile butadiene styrene (ABS). Bakelite continues to be used for wire insulation, brake pads and related automotive components, and industrial electrical-related applications. Bakelite stock is still manufactured and produced in sheet, rod, and tube form for industrial applications in the electronics, power generation, and aerospace industries, and under a variety of commercial brand names.

Phenolic resins have high heat resistance and tend to smolder rather than burn or melt. For this reason Phenolics are used in welding and other high heat applications and have been commonly used in ablative heat shields. Soviet heatshields for ICBM warheads and spacecraft reentry consisted of asbestos textolite, impregnated with Bakelite. Bakelite is also used in the mounting of metal samples in metallography.

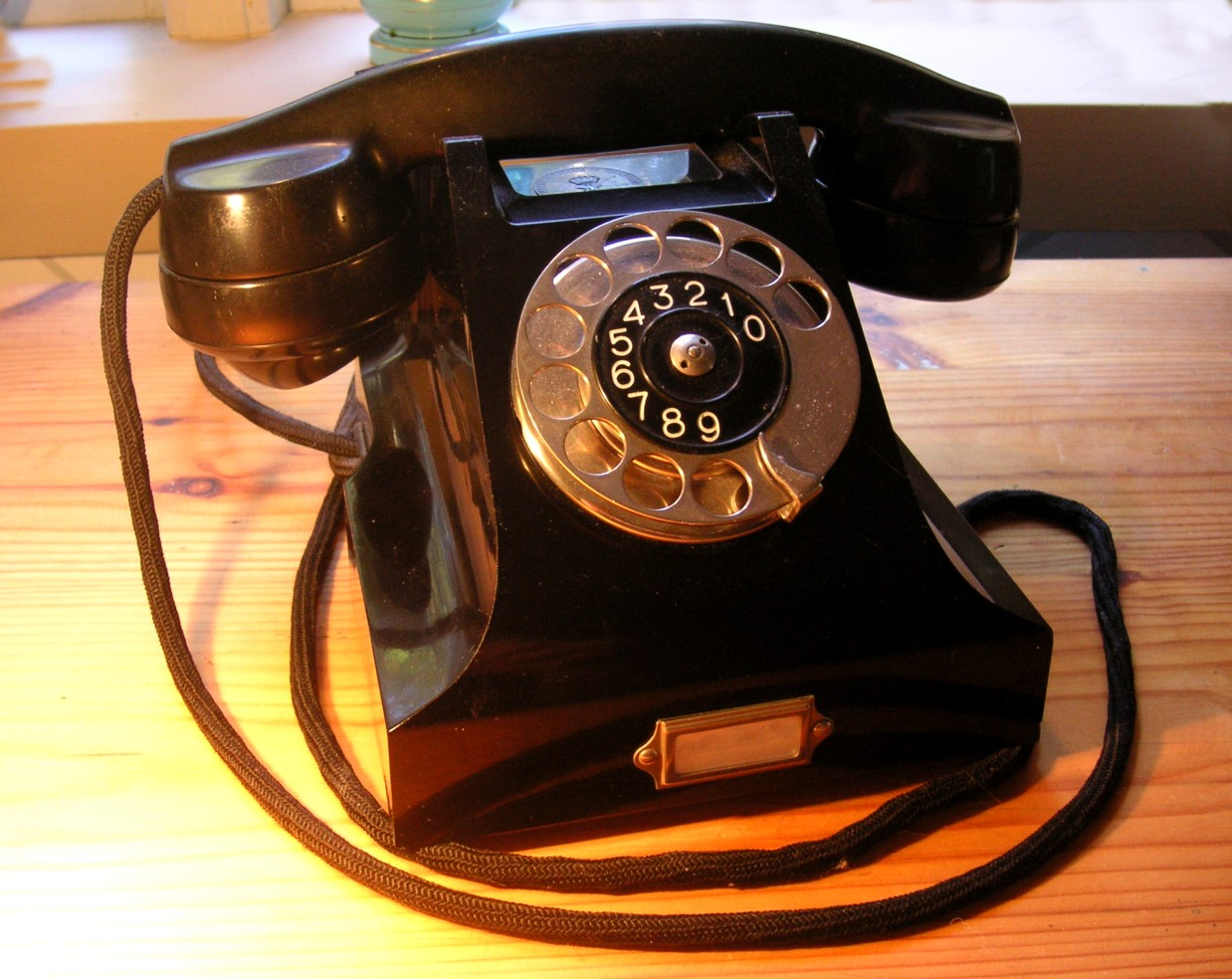
Ericsson Bakelite telephone, c. 1931

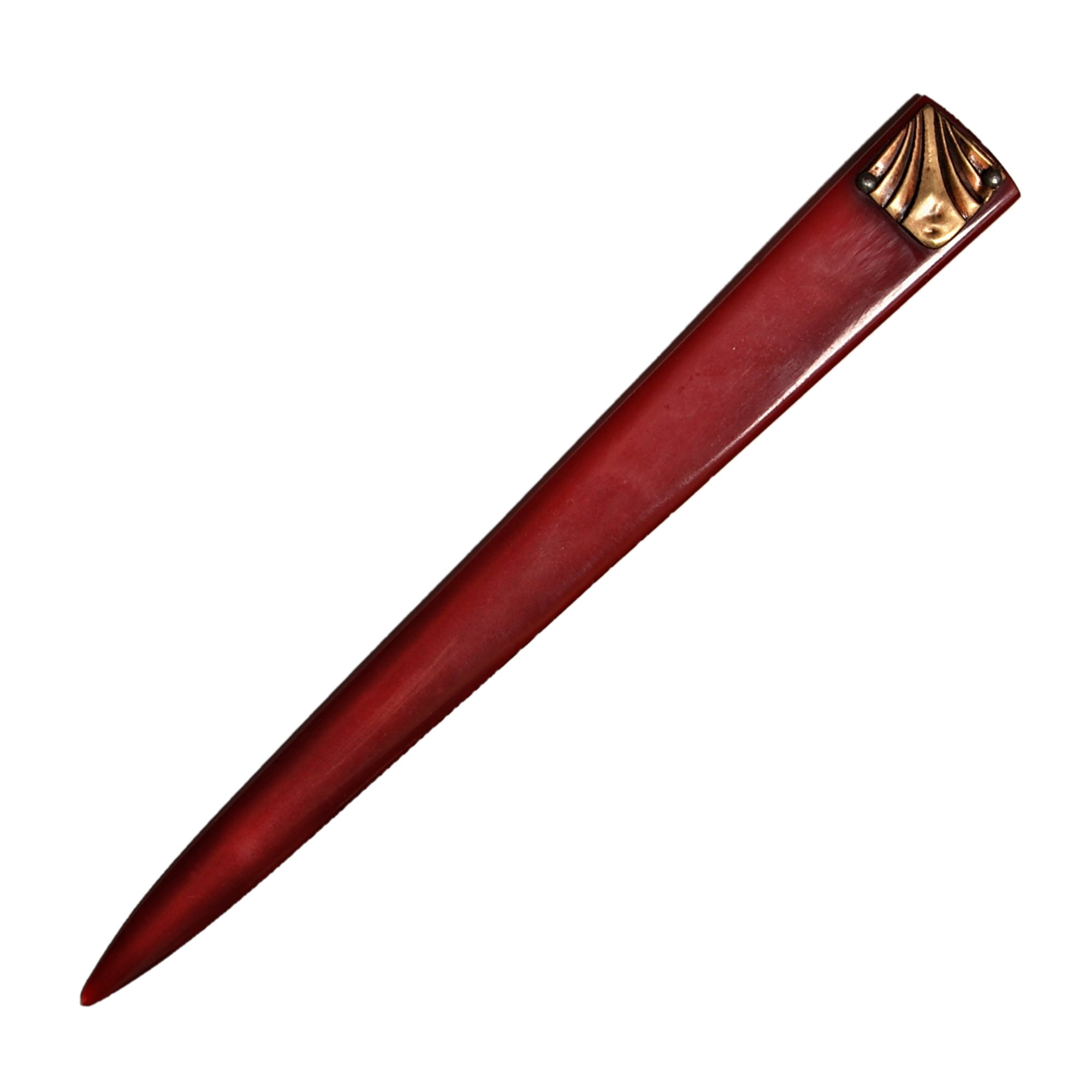
Bakelite letter opener c. 1920

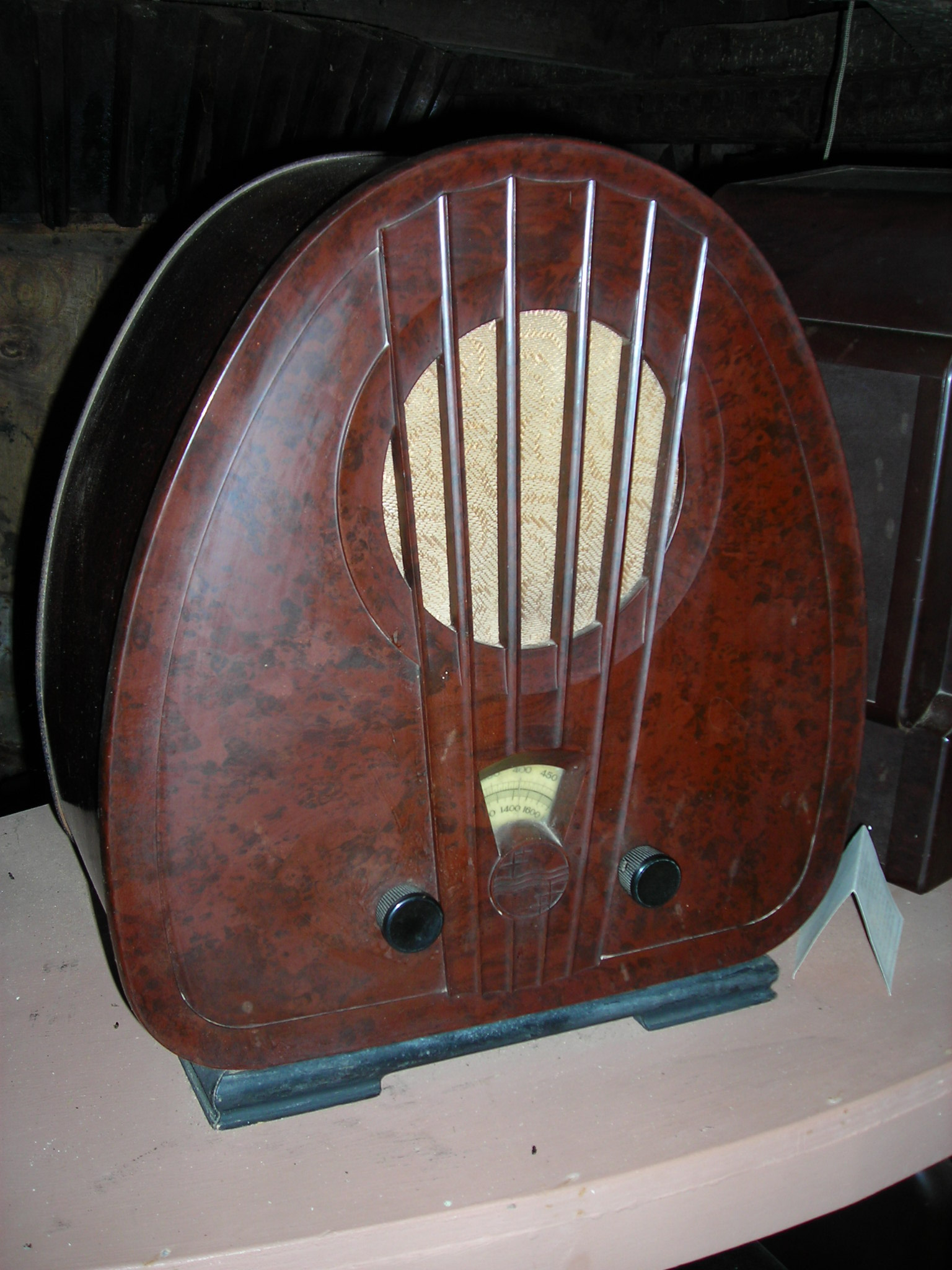
Bakelite radio at Bakelite museum

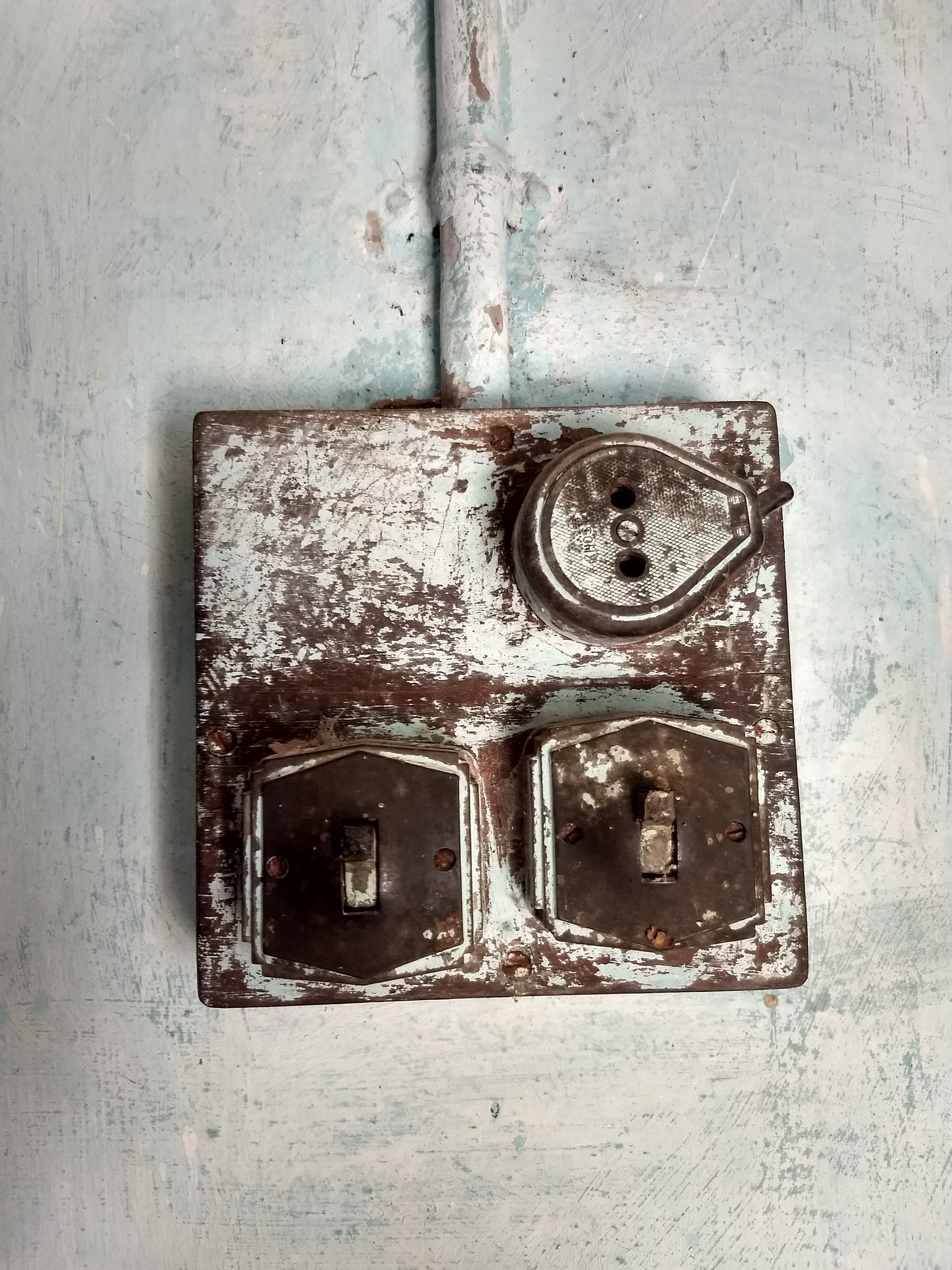
Old tumbler switch composed of Bakelite

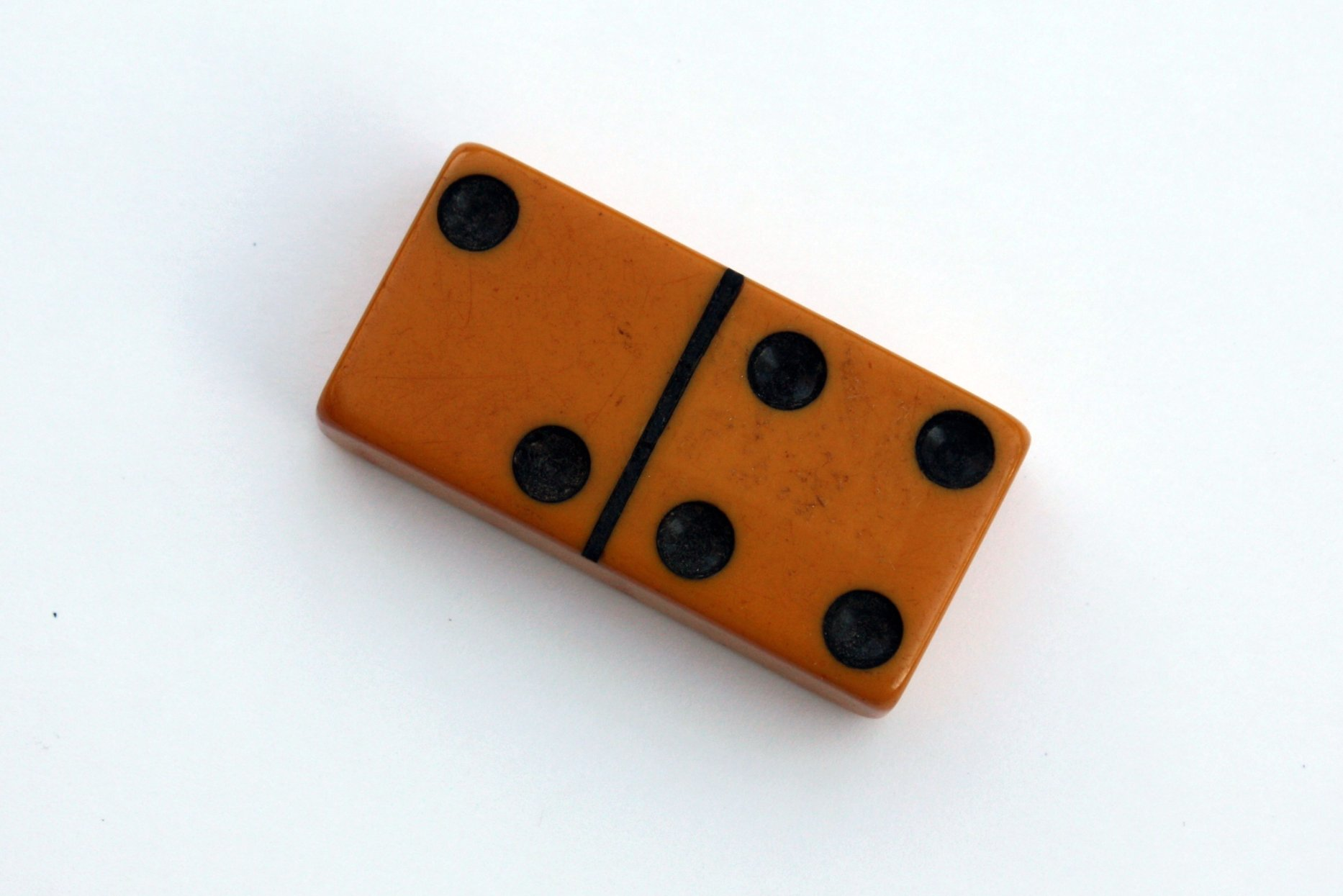
A Bakelite domino

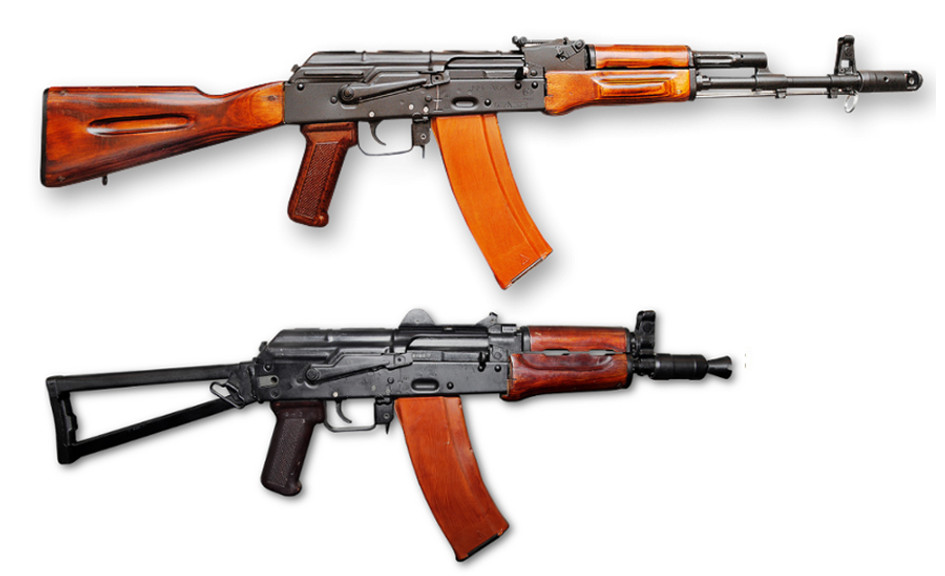
AK-74 and AKS-74U with AG-4 (Bakelite analogue) magazines and pistol grips

== Collectibles ==
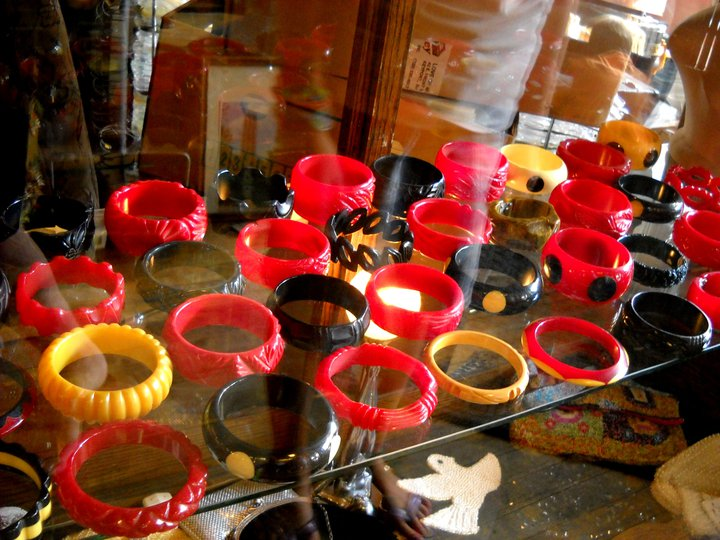
Bracelets made of Bakelite

Bakelite items, particularly jewelry and radios, have become popular collectibles.

The term Bakelite is sometimes used in the resale market as a catch-all for various types of early plastics, including Catalin and Faturan, which may be brightly colored, as well as items made of true Bakelite material.

Due to its aesthetics, a similar material fakelite (fake bakelite) exists made from modern safer materials which do not contain asbestos.

== Patents ==
The United States Patent and Trademark Office granted Baekeland a patent for a "Method of making insoluble products of phenol and formaldehyde" on December 7, 1909. Producing hard, compact, insoluble, and infusible condensation products of phenols and formaldehyde marked the beginning of the modern plastics industry.

== Similar plastics ==
- Catalin is also a phenolic resin, similar to Bakelite, but contains different mineral fillers that allow the production of light colors.
- Condensites are similar thermoset materials having much the same properties, characteristics, and uses.
- Crystalate is an early plastic.
- Faturan is a phenolic resin, also similar to Bakelite, that turns red over time, regardless of its original color.
- Galalith is an early plastic derived from milk products.
- Micarta is an early composite insulating plate that used Bakelite as a binding agent. It was developed in 1910 by the Westinghouse Electric & Manufacturing Company, which put the new material to use for casting synthetic blades for Westinghouse electric fans.
- Novotext is a brand name for cotton textile-phenolic resin.
- G-10 or garolite is made with fiberglass and epoxy resin.

== See also ==
- Ericsson DBH 1001 telephone
- Lacquer, including antique Asian lacquerware
- Tenite, a cellulosic thermoplastic material
- Ebonite, a similar material
