= NeeDoh =

Fidget toy

- A NeeDoh Nice Cube
- Product type: Sensory fidget toy
- Current owner: Schylling
- Country: North Andover, Massachusetts, U.S.
- Introduced: 2017
- Markets: Worldwide
- Website: schylling.com/brand/needoh/

NeeDoh is a line of sensory fidget toys produced by the American toy company Schylling. The toys are small, squeezable items filled with a non-toxic, dough-like compound that returns to its original shape after being squeezed or stretched.

Originally launched in 2017 as the "NeeDoh, The Groovy Glob" stress ball, the NeeDoh line has expanded to include over 50 different styles in a variety of shapes, textures, and colors. The line became a viral sensation on TikTok in late 2025 and early 2026, causing widespread stock shortages at retailers across the United States and internationally.

== Background ==
NeeDoh is manufactured by Schylling, a novelty toy company founded in 1975 by Jack Schylling, who began his career as a street vendor selling mechanical flying bird toys at Faneuil Hall in Boston. The company, headquartered in North Andover, Massachusetts, is known for its portfolio of toy brands, including Lava Lamp, Big Wheel, and Sea-Monkeys. In 2013, the company was acquired by Crofton Capital and Gladstone Investment Corporation, with Paul Weingard becoming president and later CEO. According to Schylling chief executive Paul Weingard, the brand grew out of the company's earlier work in the sensory category, including a Lava Lamp slime product, and was driven by a goal of producing a stress ball with a markedly softer formula than competing products on the market.

The original NeeDoh launched at a retail price of US$3.99 and sold out within thirty days, with retailers reordering ten times their initial quantities. The toy's brand and packaging were created and designed by Mack Fraga, Schylling's VP of Product Development, over a 24-hour period. He used spot-printed fluorescent colors and wrote the slogan "touch me, pinch me, squeeze me, squish me", inviting shoppers to handle the product on the shelf.

The "NeeDoh Nice Cube", a square-shaped variant filled with a firmer dough-like material, was introduced about three years after the original. According to Schylling, it quickly outpaced the original Groovy Glob in popularity. By 2023, Schylling reported that the NeeDoh range had become a leader in the fidget category and had attracted over 150 million views on TikTok and more than 5,000 tags on Instagram.

== Design and materials ==
Each NeeDoh toy is filled with a soft, dough-like compound that returns to its original shape after being squeezed or stretched. The fillings vary across the product lineup and include food-grade maltose sugar, polyvinyl alcohol (PVA), and cornstarch, giving each variety a distinct feel. According to CEO Paul Weingard, the company can "modify these basic ingredients in a number of different ways to give a whole variety of different experiences."

The original product, "NeeDoh, The Groovy Glob", is a round stress ball available in multiple neon colors. Subsequent additions to the line include the "Nice Cube" (a cube-shaped variant, and the most popular kind of NeeDoh) , "Cool Cats", "Funky Pups", "Gummy Bear", "Dream Drop", "Dohnut", "Nice Berg", "Nice Cream Cone", "Gumdrop", and many others. Schylling has also released seasonal products, including an Advent calendar multi-pack.

== Popularity ==
NeeDoh had been steadily growing in sales since its 2017 launch, with the company reporting "double-digit growth year over year." The brand experienced a dramatic surge in popularity beginning in late 2025 and accelerating through early 2026. The rise was fueled in large part by TikTok, where ASMR-style squeeze videos, collection showcases, and "NeeDoh hunting" content proliferated. Marketing professor Jenny Guo of Binghamton University described the phenomenon as "'slow-burn' virality," noting that many small creators independently posted squeeze videos over months, eventually crossing a tipping point.

The rise in popularity is often attributed to the marketing of NeeDoh products as stress-management tools used by therapists. Clinical psychologist Barbara Greenberg, writing in Psychology Today in April 2026, noted that the toys are often used by therapists as tools for patients dealing with stress and anxiety, and that teenagers in particular find them helpful for self-regulation. Schylling CEO Paul Weingard acknowledged the widespread therapeutic use, saying he was "amazed at the broad range of ways that NeeDoh fans are using the product," including by students seeking to maintain focus. Some have criticized the newfound popularity of the line, viewing it as overly consumerist and contributing to the spread of sociogenic illness through social media.

By early 2026, Google searches for "NeeDoh" had reached an all-time high, outpacing queries for "Play-Doh" and "stress ball" by more than tenfold. Weingard told Business Insider that "within the first nine weeks of the year, we'd sold through the whole year's inventory." Retailers across the country reported that shipments would sell out the same day they arrived, with some stores limiting purchases to one or two per customer. The demand was compared by some retailers to the Cabbage Patch Kids and Beanie Babies crazes of the 1980s and 1990s, along with more recent crazes, such as Labubus, Squishmallows, and Jellycat plushes.

The scarcity drove significant activity on the resale market. On eBay, NeeDoh products that typically retail for $3 to $15 were listed for hundreds of dollars.

=== Counterfeits ===
During the 2026 shortage, counterfeit NeeDoh toys and fraudulent retail listings became a consumer concern. Schylling issued public warnings about counterfeit products being sold on platforms such as Temu, Alibaba, and eBay, advising consumers to purchase from authorized brick-and-mortar retailers like Target, Walmart, and Staples, noting that counterfeit products could differ in packaging, branding, materials, and squeeze feel. Consumer guides have also identified Schylling-branded packaging and molded or embossed NeeDoh markings on many full-size toys as common indicators used to distinguish authentic products from imitations.

== Misuse ==
In 2026, following the viral spread of the toys, reports emerged of injuries related to misuse. Hospitals reported burn incidents after children microwaved NeeDoh toys following a social media trend that showed users briefly heating them to make them more pliable. An Illinois mother told ABC News that her nine-year-old son suffered burn injuries after a microwaved NeeDoh Nice Cube exploded. In response, Schylling stated that "misusing a NeeDoh product by microwaving, heating, or freezing is dangerous and could cause injury" and said it had partnered with TikTok to remove content demonstrating product misuse. The company also added safety warnings to its packaging and e-commerce listings.

== See also ==
- Fidget toy
- Stress ball
- Sensory processing
- Squishy
