= Begleri =

Greek skill toy

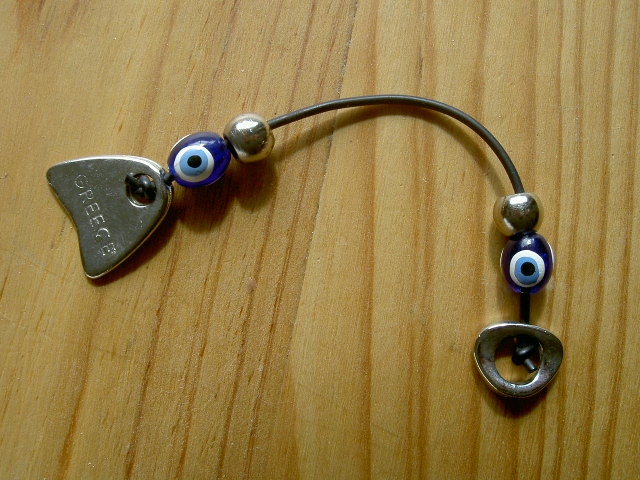
A modern set of Greek begleri

Slinging a begleri

Begleri (Greek: μπεγλέρι) is a small skill toy consisting of one or more beads at either end of a short string or chain. It can be flipped and twirled around the fingers to perform tricks. The begleri originated in Greece, where both the name and the practice derive from the komboloi, the Greek form of worry beads, which is often flipped and swung around the fingers to pass the time or keep the hands busy. While komboloia have beads strung in a closed loop, the beads of the modern begleri are threaded on an open strand, usually in a symmetrical formation, with equal weighting at either end; this is sometimes referred to as "open-string begleri". Begleria come in many forms, consisting of semi-precious stone or metal beads. They can be similar in form to the percussion instrument kashaka, but are much smaller in size.

== History ==
The word begleri is attested in Greek rebetiko songs of the interwar period, in which begleria appear alongside knives as emblems of the mangas subculture. Examples include «Μανώλης Χασικλής» ("Manolis the hash smoker", 1930), Panagiotis Toundas's «Η Λιλή η σκανδαλιάρα» ("Lili the mischievous", 1931) and Anestis Delias's «Το σακάκι» ("The jacket", 1935). According to the rebetiko researcher Panos Savvopoulos, the word komboloi itself had little currency in the mangas milieu, which called the worry beads begleri instead.

In these earlier uses the word denoted a closed strand. The begleri carried by the mangas and koutsavakides is described as a garland of around sixteen beads on a cord considerably longer than the beads themselves, suited to being spun around the hand and clacked, in contrast to the odd bead count of the conventional komboloi. A form with a single bead at each end of a short string whose ends are left untied, so that no loop is formed, is described as a later development among younger players. It is this open-strand form that has circulated internationally as a skill toy.

== Modern revival ==
In recent years the begleri has grown in popularity outside Greece as a skill toy and everyday carry item. This has led to a proliferation of begleri designs and styles, using all manner of modern materials. The recent uptick in interest among collectors and skill toy enthusiasts dates back to at least the early 2010s, when it began gaining popularity on hobbyist sites. As the popularity grew in online forums and social media, different styles of play began to emerge. A wide range of different styles of play and categories of tricks have developed, many of which can only be performed with relatively long-stringed begleri, termed "long game" by enthusiasts.

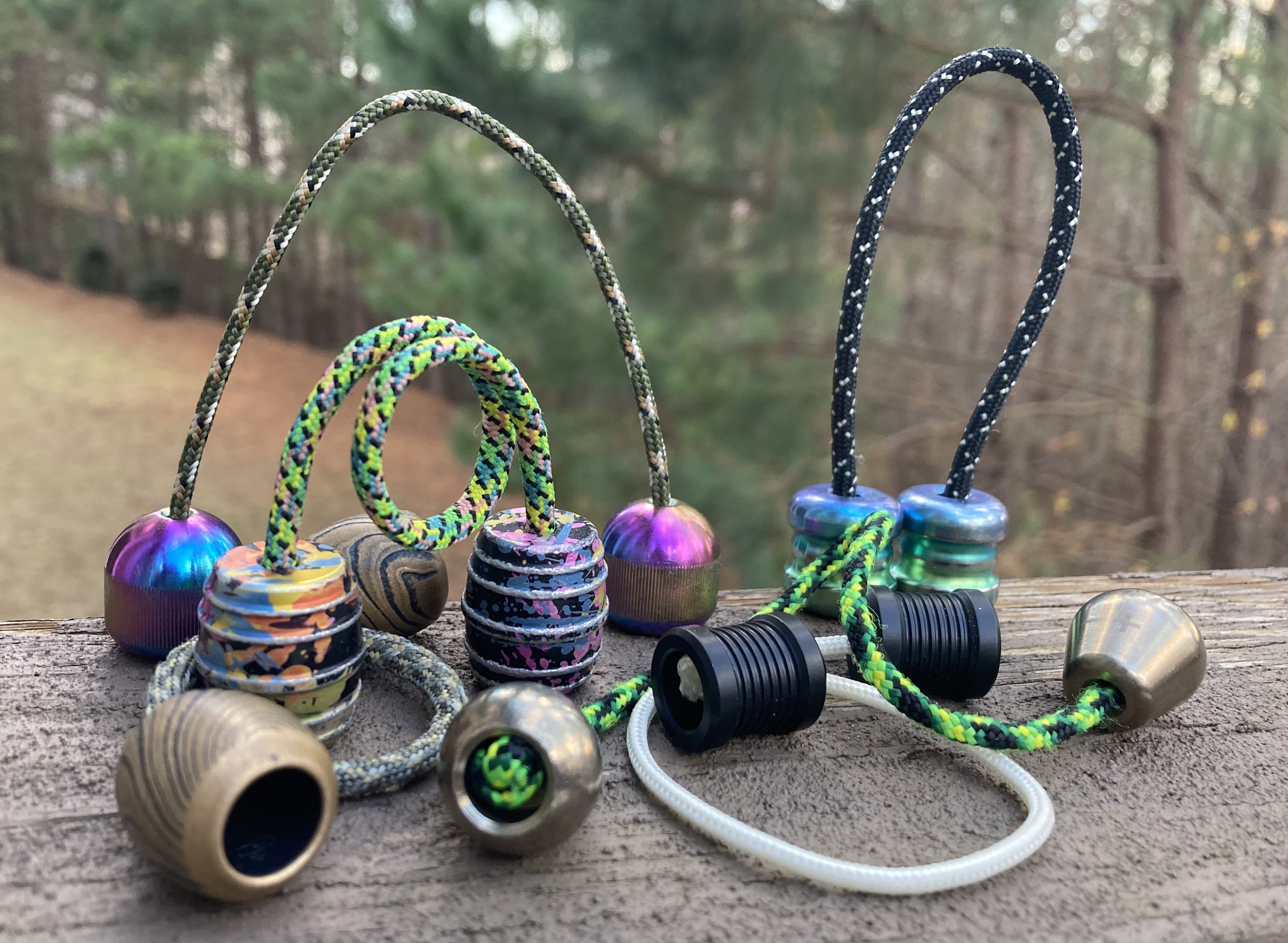
An assortment of begleri made from different metals

Due to the nature of play, begleri have shifted from traditional ornate beads to simpler performance-oriented beads made from more durable materials. Two common begleri types are monkey-fist "beads", made from paracord, and solid beads, which can be made of metal (aluminum, steel, titanium), acrylic resin, Delrin, Ultem, or wood.
