= Catalin =

Resin plastic, popular 1930s-1950s

Catalin is a brand name for a thermosetting polymer developed and trademarked in 1927 by the American Catalin Corporation of New York City, when the patent on Bakelite expired that year. A phenol formaldehyde resin, it can be worked with files, grinders, and cutters, and polished to a fine sheen.

Catalin is produced by a two-stage process, different from other types of phenolic resins, and does not contain fillers, such as sawdust or carbon black. Catalin is transparent, near colorless, rather than opaque. Unlike other phenolics, it can be produced in bright colors or even marbled. This fact has made Catalin more popular than other types of Bakelite for consumer products.

Catalin is heavy, quite greasy in feel, and as hard as brass. It is heat resistant and does not soften under boiling water. Like Bakelite, it gives off a distinctive phenolic odour when heated and can be tested by rubbing the material on a cloth with a spot of Simichrome Polish or Formula 409 cleaner, which will leave a characteristic light pink to yellow residue. Due to oxidation, older Catalin items darken in color; white discolors to yellow. This caused interesting effects in radio cabinets made from Catalin. Catalin radios were often made in stylish Art Deco designs and are sought after by collectors.

== Applications ==
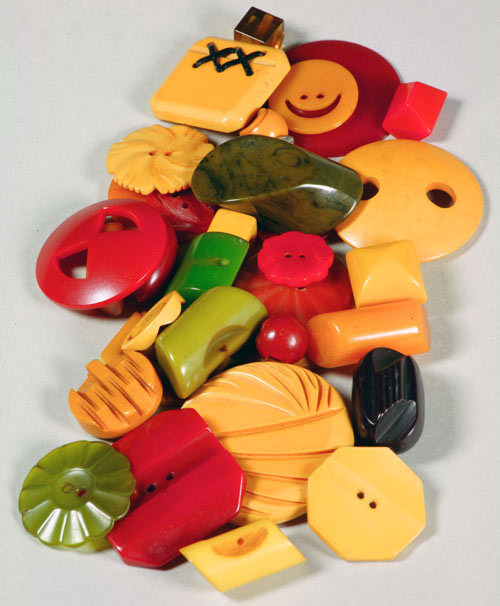
Colorful buttons made from Catalin were popular in the 1930s.

Catalin was used from the 1930s to 1950s for many household objects, jewelry, small boxes, lamps, cutlery handles, and desk sets. Catalin jewelry, more commonly referred to incorrectly as Bakelite jewelry, was made from the 1930s until the end of World War II when it became too expensive, as every piece had to be individually cast and polished. The American Catalin Corporation introduced 15 new colors in 1927 and developed techniques to create marbling. The colors included yellow, orange, red, greens, blue, and purple, with clear, opaque and marbled versions. In the 1930s, jewelry made in these colors was popular with sets of beads, bangles, earrings, and rings being worn together.

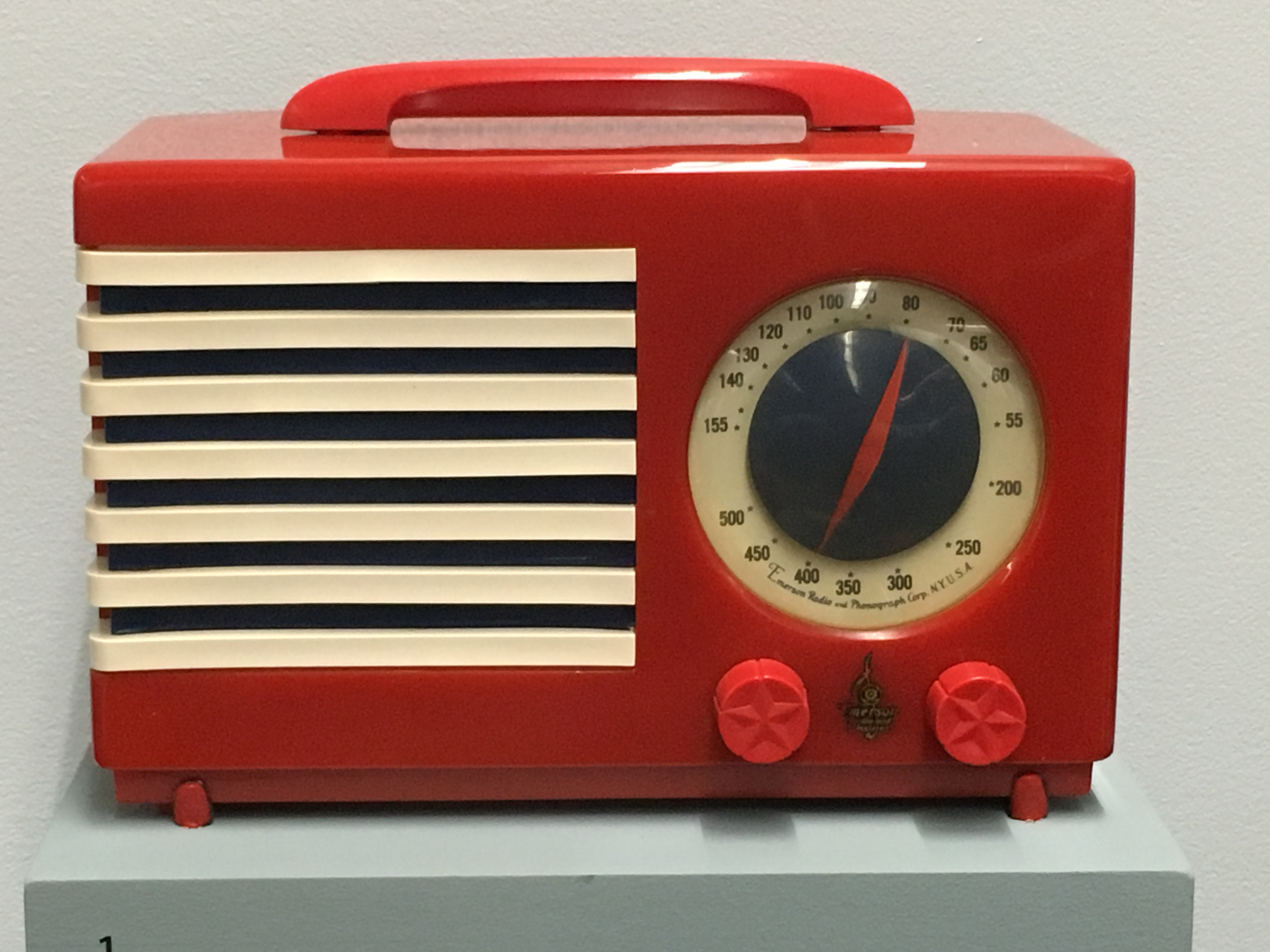
Emerson Model 400-3 "Patriot" (1940) radio, made of Catalin

Catalin was also used to make radios. In a labor-intensive process, liquid resin was cast and cured with heat, and then polished by hand into Art Deco designs. Notable designers of Catalin radios included Norman Bel Geddes and Walter Dorwin Teague. The bright colors of Catalin radios were meant to convey optimism during the Great Depression.

Jewelry made out of Catalin is usually referred to as Bakelite in the antique trade, while the household items, radios, cutlery, etc. are accurately referred to as Catalin.

The grips on John Wayne's iconic six shooter, seen in every movie from El Dorado through True Grit, were made of Catalin, not ivory, as often thought.

Catalin has also been used for mountings on the great highland bagpipe. This use is no longer common due to a tendency for them to turn orange with age.
