= Mangas =

Late 19th, early 20th century Greek social group

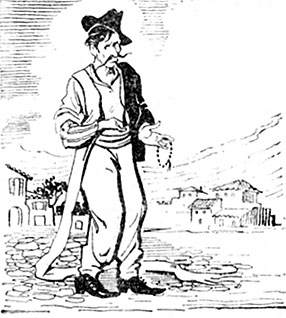
A mangas holding a komboloi

Manges (/ˈmɑːŋɡeɪs/; Greek: μάγκες [ˈma(ɲ)ɟes]; sing. mangas /ˈmɑːŋɡɑːs/, μάγκας [ˈma(ŋ)ɡas]), also known as koutsavakides (Greek: κουτσαβάκηδες [kut͡savaˈciðes]; sing. koutsavakis [kut͡savaˈcis], κουτσαβάκης), is the name of a social group in the Belle Époque era's (Note: The time period in Greek history that began during the late 19th century and lasted until World War I is called προπολεμική εποχή ("antebellum era") in the Greek literature and corresponds to the Western European Belle Époque.) counterculture of Greece (especially of the great urban centers of Athens and Piraeus). The nearest English equivalents to the term "mangas" is wide boy, spiv or chav.

== Overview ==
Mangas was a label for men belonging to the Greek working class, behaving in a particularly arrogant/presumptuous way, and dressing with a very typical vesture composed of a woolen hat (kavouraki, καβουράκι), a jacket (they usually wore only one of its sleeves), a tight belt (used as a knife case), stripe pants, and pointy shoes. Other features of their appearance were their long moustache, their komboloi bead chaplets (κομπολόγια, sing. κομπολόι), and their idiosyncratic manneristic limp-walking (κουτσό βάδισμα). A related social group were the koutsavakides (κουτσαβάκηδες, sing. κουτσαβάκης); the two terms are occasionally used interchangeably. Manges are also notable for being closely associated with the history of rebetiko.

== Etymology ==
The three most probable etymologies of the word Mangas are the following:

- From the Turkish manga "small military troop" via Albanian mangë.
- From the Latin manica (from the same root as Modern Greek μανίκι "sleeve") "hand-related" (cf. the sound change from the Latin manicus to the Spanish mango "handle").
- According to a more marginal proposal, its origin is from the Latin mango, -onis "dealer, trader".

== In popular culture ==
Most rebetiko songs refer to manges, even when this is not explicit, as rebetiko was part of this subculture. Examples are: "Στην Υπόγα" ("In the Basement", by Kostis, 1930), "Ο Μάγκας του Βοτανικού" ("The Mangas of Votanikos", by Kasimatis, 1934). The admiration of manges was carried on with the later genre of Greek music Laïko. Examples are: "Πού 'σουν μάγκα το Χειμώνα" ("Where Were You, Mangas, During the Winter", by Giorgos Mouflezis, 70s), and others.

Karagiozis shadow plays portray a recurrent character called Stavrakas, Σταύρακας.

In modern Greek language, mangas has become a synonym for "swash guy, swagger" or (in dialogue) simply "dude"; depending on context it may have more negative ("bully, thug, hooligan") or more positive ("brave, crafty man, lad") connotations.

== Bibliography ==
- Stasinopoulos, Epaminondas. Η Αθήνα του περασμένου αιώνα (1830–1900) – Last Century's Athens (1830–1900), Athens, 1963 (in Greek).
