= Fidget =

Fidget may refer to:

- ST Fidget, a British Admiralty tugboat
- Fidgeting, the inability to sit still for a period of time
- A fidget toy, a type of stress-relieving toy
  - Fidget spinner, a type of fidget toy
- Fidget house, a genre of Electro house

== See also ==
- Phidget, a type of electronics component
