= Pet Rock =

Toy in 1970s

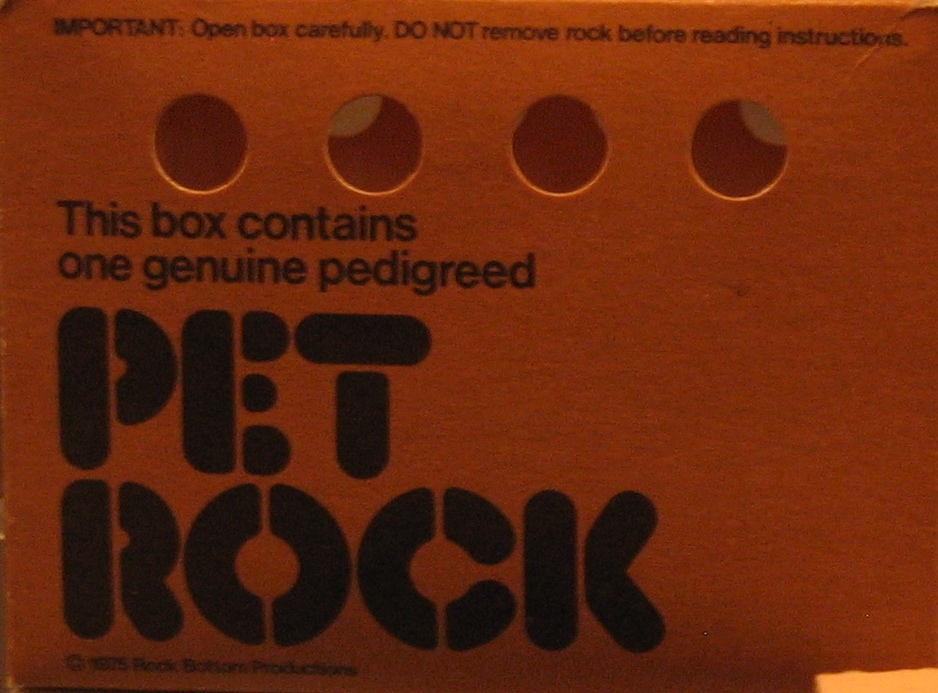
- The Pet Rock "Pet Carrier", which doubled as its packaging
- Type: Collectible toy
- Invented by: Gary Dahl
- Country: United States
- Availability: 1975–present
- Materials: Rock

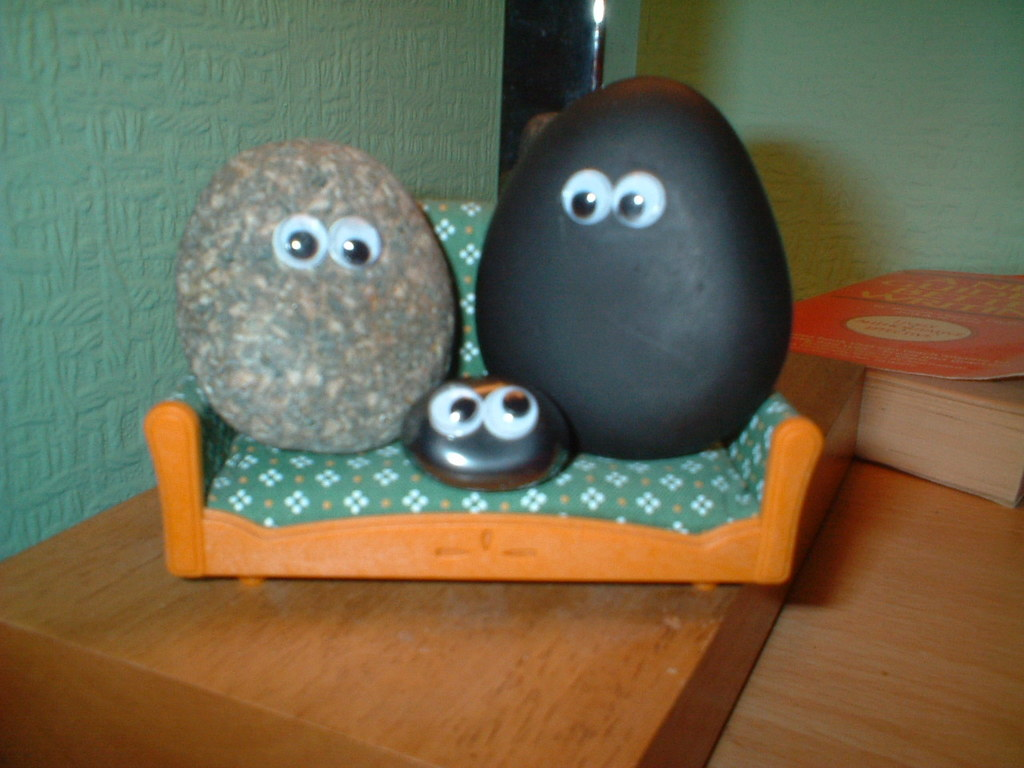
The Pet Rocks with googly eyes on them

The Pet Rock is a collectible toy made in 1975 by advertising executive Gary Dahl. They are rocks packaged in custom cardboard boxes complete with ventilation holes and straw bedding imitating a pet carrier.

== History ==
Gary Dahl came up with the idea in a bar while listening to his friends complain about their pets; this gave him the idea for the perfect "pet": a rock. A rock would not need to be fed, walked, bathed, groomed, spayed, or neutered, and it would not die, become sick, or be disobedient. Dahl said that they were to be the perfect pets and joked about it with his friends before producing Pet Rocks as toys in 1975.

Lacking the capital to launch the product, Dahl recruited George Coakley and John Heagerty, two colleagues, to come on as investors. He purchased the actual rocks from Mexican beaches for less than a penny each.

The Pet Rock was introduced in August 1975 at a San Francisco trade show, and Dahl was then swarmed by orders from retailers. The fad lasted about six months, ending after the Christmas season of December 1975. Dahl attempted to regenerate interest the following year by selling a Bicentennial rock, with the American flag painted on, but this failed to find an audience. Dahl sold nearly 1.5 million Pet Rocks for just under $4 each during the initial release, turning 95 cents profit on each unit, and became a millionaire.

In 2022, the toy company Super Impulse purchased the rights to the Pet Rock, reviving the brand. In the 2020s, Pet Rocks grew in popularity in South Korea as tools for meditation or venting out frustrations. Members of K-pop groups such as Seventeen and Enhypen post about their Pet Rocks online.

A24 produced an official licensed Pet Rock as a tie-in for the film Everything Everywhere All at Once. This version of the Pet Rock has a pair of googly eyes attached in reference to a scene from that film. Also included are the straw bedding and instructions of the original, and a new version of the ventilated box printed with scenery from the film.

== See also ==
- Fidget spinner
- Worry stone
- Fidget Cube
- Labubu
- Beanie Babies
- Office toy
- Stress ball
- Spinning top
