= Gary Dahl =

Gary Dahl may refer to:

- Gary G. Dahl (born 1940), member of the Illinois Senate
- Gary Dahl (businessman) (1936–2015), originator of Pet Rocks

== See also ==
- Gary Dale Farmer (born 1953), Canadian actor
