= Sensory play =

Sensory play stimulates the senses of the player. It can mean:

- Guided therapeutic play for children such as occupational therapy;
- Children playing on their own with toys designed specifically to stimulate their senses, such as fidget toys; or
- An adult activity, sensation play, involving a partner delivering sensory stimuli to the receiver, often but not always involving pain.
