= Yoshimoto =

Yoshimoto may refer to:

- Yoshimoto Kogyo, a Japan entertainment company

== People with the given name ==
- Hisaya Yoshimoto (吉本 久也; born 1973), Japanese weightlifter
- Imagawa Yoshimoto, one of the leading daimyō (feudal lords) in the Sengoku period Japan
- Nijō Yoshimoto, 14th-century Japanese poet

== People with the surname ==
- Banana Yoshimoto, pen name of Japanese writer Mahoko Yoshimoto
- Hiroki Yoshimoto, Japanese race car driver
- Kinji Yoshimoto (1966–2021), Japanese animator
- Takaaki Yoshimoto, Japanese poet, literary critic, and philosopher

== See also ==
- Yoshimoto Cube, a polyhedral mechanical puzzle toy invented in 1971
- Shizuka Yoshimoto, a character from the anime and manga series The 100 Girlfriends Who Really, Really, Really, Really, Really Love You
