= Stimming =

Repetitive self-stimulatory behaviour common in neurodevelopmental disorders

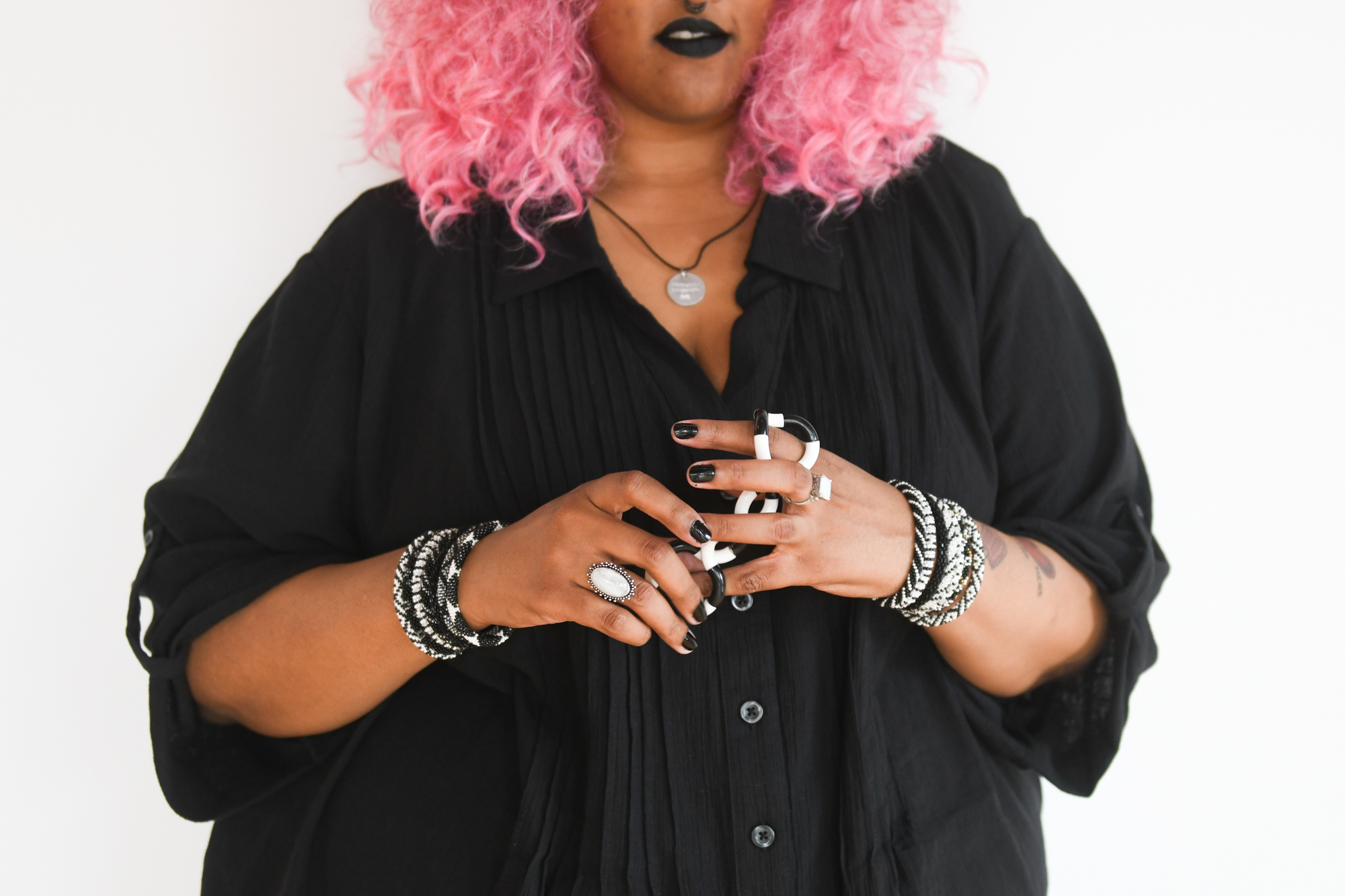
An autistic adult stimming with a stim toy in their hands

Self-stimulatory behavior (also called stimming, stims, self-stimulation, stereotypy, and stereotypic movement disorder) is the repetition of physical movements, sounds, words, moving objects, or other behaviors. Stimming is a type of restricted and repetitive behavior (RRB). They can be both conscious and subconscious. Such behaviors are found to some degree in all people, but are especially intense and frequent in those with developmental disabilities, attention deficit hyperactivity disorder (ADHD), sensory processing disorder, or autism.

Stimming has been interpreted as a protective response to sensory overload, in which people calm themselves by blocking less predictable environmental stimuli, to which they have a heightened sensory processing sensitivity. Stimming can be a way to relieve anxiety and other negative or heightened emotions.

Although some forms of stimming behaviors have typically been shown to be healthy and beneficial as they help regulate intense sensory experiences, relieve intense emotions such as anxiety, may facilitate understanding and social interactions with other autistic people, may promote pleasant emotions, and facilitate sense of security, stimming is often socially stigmatized. Those who are neurodivergent often feel that they should hide or decrease their repetitive behaviors, by a social process called masking, because they appear to be socially unacceptable and often elicit negative reactions from those who do not understand their cause. While reducing disruptive or inherently harmful repetitive behaviors can be beneficial, there are also potential risks to mental health and well-being in suppressing and masking some autistic stimming behaviors that are not harmful or are adaptive.

Stimming behaviors can consist of tactile, visual, auditory, vocal, proprioceptive (which pertains to limb sensing), olfactory, and vestibular stimming (which pertains to balance). Stimming behaviours include hand flapping, clapping, rocking, blinking, pacing, head banging, repeating noises or words, snapping fingers, toe walking, and spinning objects. In some cases, stimming can be dangerous and physically harmful to the person doing it; for example, individuals may risk injuring themselves by forcefully banging their body parts against walls. Another problem is that repetitive behaviors can disrupt learning and social communication for some autistic individuals in some situations.

== Autism ==
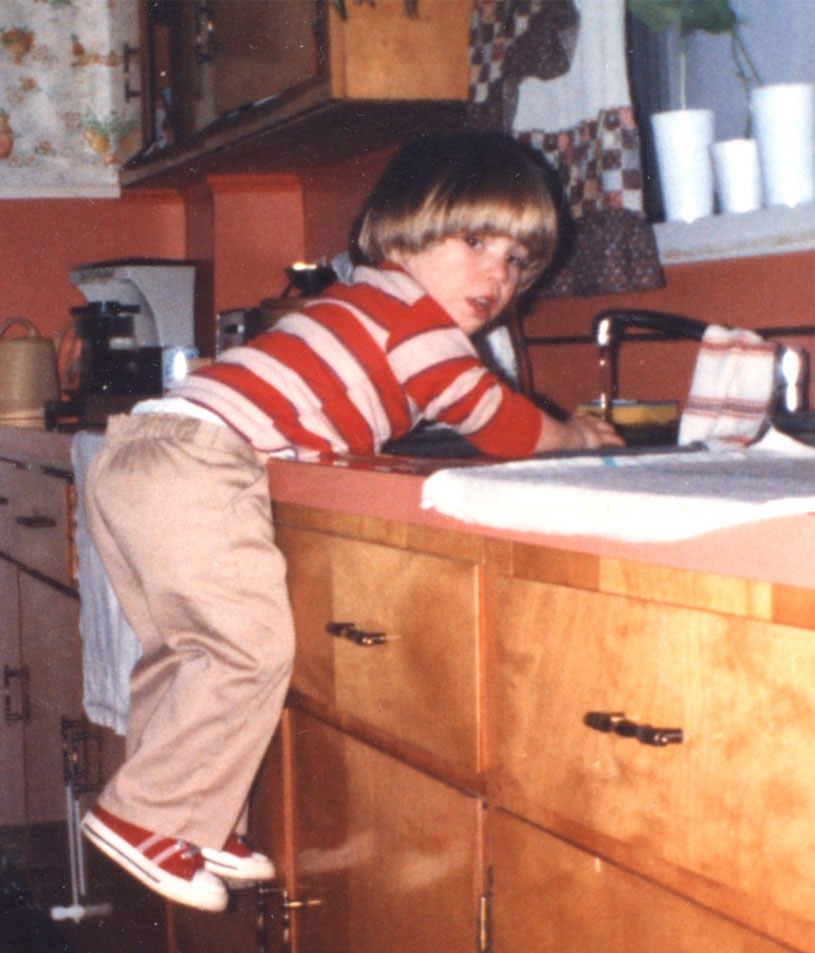
A young autistic child stimming with cold water in the kitchen sink

Stimming behavior is almost always present in autistic people, but does not, on its own, necessarily indicate the diagnosis. The biggest difference between autistic and non-autistic stimming is the type of stim and the quantity of stimming. In the Diagnostic and Statistical Manual of Mental Disorders, published by the American Psychiatric Association, stimming behavior is described as "stereotyped or repetitive motor movements" and listed as one of the five key diagnostic criteria of autism spectrum disorder.

Different perspectives suggest that stimming involves both sensory and motor functions. Underdevelopment of these sensorimotor functions can result in stimming behaviors produced by the person as a controllable response. One study which interviewed thirty-two autistic adults found that unpredictable and overwhelming environments caused stimming.

Stimming can sometimes be self-injurious, such as when it involves head-banging, hand biting, excessive self-rubbing, and scratching the skin.

As it serves the purpose of self-regulation and is mostly done subconsciously, stimming is difficult to suppress. Managing the sensory and emotional environment while increasing the amount of daily exercise can increase comfort levels for the person, which may reduce the amount of the need for stimming. Consciously or subconsciously suppressing stimming with the aim to present as neurotypical is one type of autistic masking. It typically requires an exceptional effort and can negatively impact mental health and well-being.

== ADHD ==
Stimming is practiced by some, but not all, people with attention deficit hyperactivity disorder (ADHD). The cause is not thoroughly understood, but experts believe stimming is likely linked to the effects of the dopamine imbalance that occurs in the brains of people with ADHD. Some of the reasons people with ADHD might stim include to help them focus, to process and deal with their emotions, to help to deal with boredom, to express excitement, to cope with being overwhelmed by their environment, and to help them concentrate when they are uninterested with a topic or task.

The behaviors associated with ADHD stimming are characteristically repetitive and can be done consciously or unconsciously. Many neurotypical people may exhibit the same stimming behaviors, referred to as fidgeting, as someone with ADHD. However, for people with ADHD, these behaviors are more severe, occur more often, and can affect the person's daily lives. Some potentially more negative or harmful stimming behaviors include teeth grinding, lip and nail biting, skin and scab picking, overeating, impulsive actions, and chewing the inside of the cheeks.

For people with ADHD, stimming can change over time. Some stims may lessen or disappear over time, while other stims can emerge as the result of other stressors. ADHD symptoms can be aggravated by certain environments, situations, and emotions, which will trigger stimming behavior. Some of these triggers include situations involving certain emotions like conflict and rejection, distractions caused by television and phones, environments that are messy or busy, strong or distracting odors, and intense lighting.

== Research ==
=== Possible stimming with other conditions ===
==== Hand flapping ====
Flapping of the hands (usually both at once) is one of the most common signs of autism, and also appears in Angelman syndrome and Pitt–Hopkins syndrome, which are not believed to be related to autism. Whether hand flapping in these syndromes fits under a wider definition of stimming is a matter of terminology; the term stereotypy is often used in literature about Angelman syndrome, for example. Hand-flapping is also seen in fragile X syndrome patients; while fragile X syndrome correlates strongly with autism, hand flapping can also be seen in fragile X patients who do not meet the criteria for autism.

== Toys ==
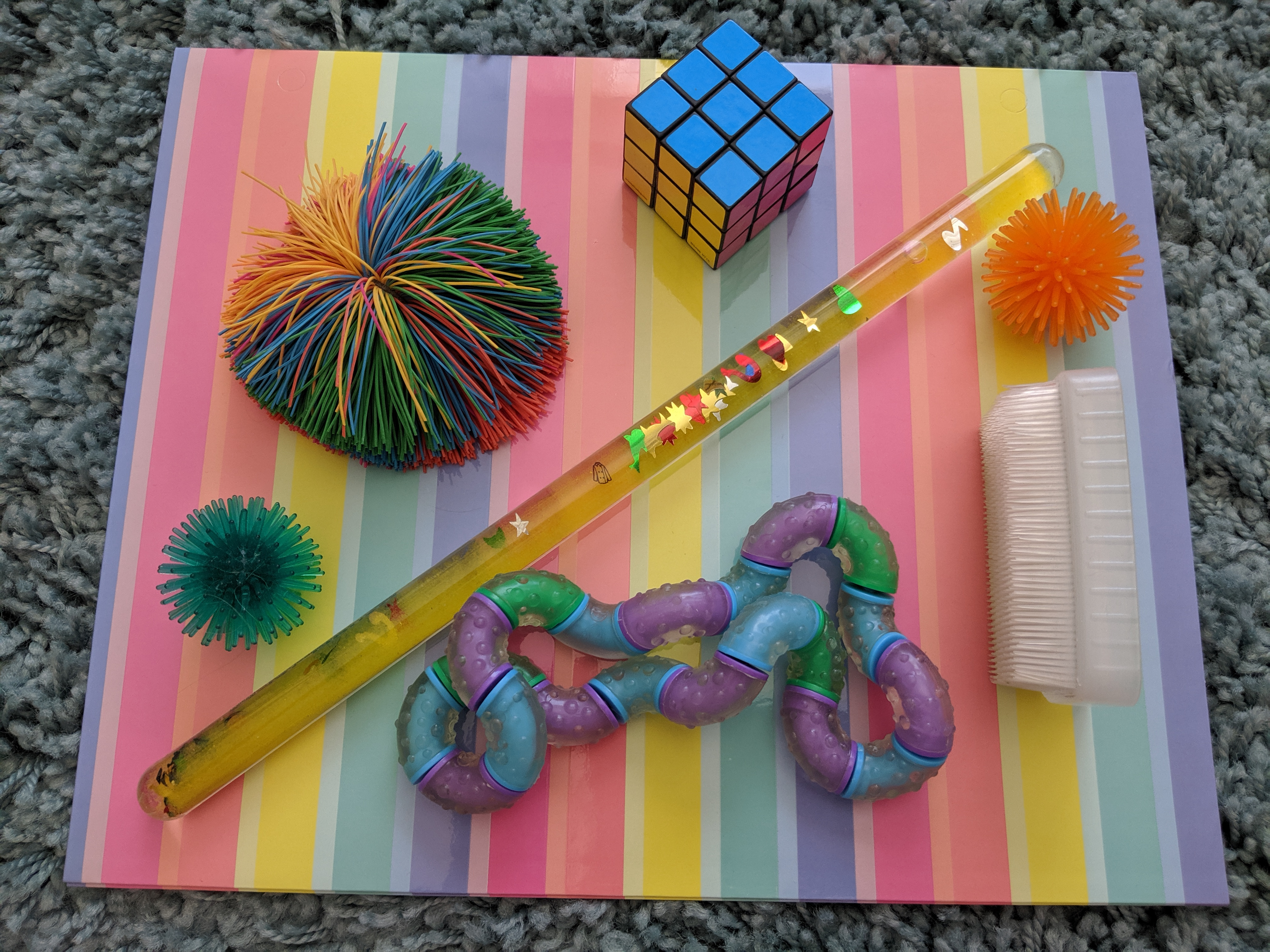
A selection of fidget toys

Small objects known as stim toys or sensory toys may be used to satisfy a person's stimming behaviours. A stim toy may be specially designed for a specific stimming behaviour, such as a fidget toy, or it may be any ordinary object that a person can manipulate to perform the desired stimming behaviour. Many popular stim toys are held in the hands; they may also provide oral stimulation, such as chewelry.

== See also ==
- ASMR – Phenomena of sensory perception
- Fidget spinner – Stress-relieving toy
- Fidgeting – Type of involuntary movement
- Hug machine – Device to calm hypersensitive persons
- Snoezelen – Form of therapeutic relaxation
- Tic – Sudden movement or vocalization
