= Stars (M. C. Escher) =

1948 wood engraving print by M. C. Escher

- Artist: M. C. Escher
- Year: 1948
- Type: wood engraving
- Dimensions: 32 cm × 26 cm (13 in × 10 in)

Stars is a wood engraving print created by the Dutch artist M. C. Escher in 1948, depicting two chameleons in a polyhedral cage floating through space.

The compound of three octahedra used for the central cage in Stars had been studied before in mathematics, and Escher likely learned of it from the book Vielecke und Vielflache by Max Brückner. Escher used similar compound polyhedral forms in several other works, including Crystal (1947), Study for Stars (1948), Double Planetoid (1949), and Waterfall (1961).

The design for Stars was likely influenced by Escher's own interest in both geometry and astronomy, by a long history of using geometric forms to model the heavens, and by a drawing style used by Leonardo da Vinci. Commentators have interpreted the cage's compound shape as a reference to double and triple stars in astronomy, or to twinned crystals in crystallography. The image contrasts the celestial order of its polyhedral shapes with the more chaotic forms of biology.

Prints of Stars belong to the permanent collections of major museums including the Rijksmuseum, the National Gallery of Art, and the National Gallery of Canada.

== Description ==
Stars is a wood engraving print; that is, it was produced by carving the artwork into the end grain of a block of wood (unlike a woodcut which uses the side grain), and then using this block to print the image. It was created by Escher in October 1948. Although most published copies of Stars are monochromatic, with white artwork against a black background, the copy in the National Gallery of Canada is tinted in different shades of turquoise, yellow, green, and pale pink.

The print depicts a hollowed-out compound of three octahedra, a polyhedral compound composed of three interlocking regular octahedra, floating in space. Numerous other polyhedra and polyhedral compounds float in the background; the four largest are, on the upper left, the compound of cube and octahedron; on the upper right, the stella octangula; on the lower left, a compound of two cubes; and on the lower right, a solid version of the same octahedron 3-compound. The smaller polyhedra visible within the print also include all of the five Platonic solids and the rhombic dodecahedron. In order to depict polyhedra accurately, Escher made models of them from cardboard.

Two chameleons are contained within the cage-like shape of the central compound; Escher writes that they were chosen as its inhabitants "because they are able to cling by their legs and tails to the beams of their cage as it swirls through space". The chameleon on the left sticks out his tongue, perhaps in commentary; H. S. M. Coxeter observes that the tongue has an unusual spiral-shaped tip.

== Influences ==
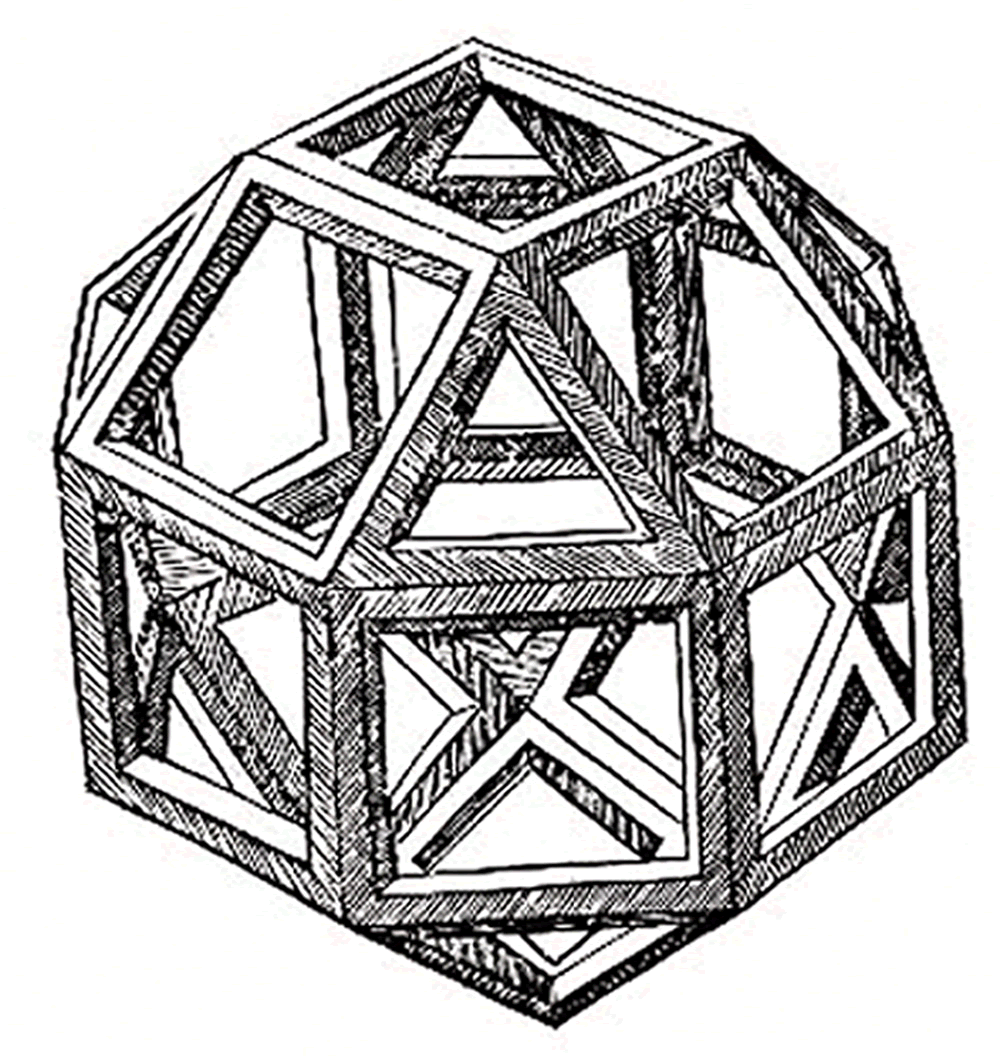
A rhombicuboctahedron drawn by Leonardo da Vinci, 1509, four centuries before Escher

Escher's interest in geometry is well known, but he was also an avid amateur astronomer, and in the early 1940s he became a member of the Dutch Association for Meteorology and Astronomy. He owned a 6 cm refracting telescope, and recorded several observations of binary stars.

The use of polyhedra to model heavenly bodies can be traced back to Plato, who in the Timaeus identified the regular dodecahedron with the shape of the heavens and its 12 faces with the constellations of the zodiac. Later, Johannes Kepler theorized that the distribution of distances of the planets from the sun could be explained by the shapes of the five Platonic solids, nested within each other. Escher kept a model of this system of nested polyhedra, and regularly depicted polyhedra in his artworks relating to astronomy and other worlds.

Escher learned his wood engraving technique from Samuel Jessurun de Mesquita. He illustrated the octahedral compound of Stars in the beveled wire-frame style that had been used by Leonardo da Vinci in his illustrations for Luca Pacioli's 1509 book, De divina proportione.

The stella octangula (Latin for "eight-pointed star") in the upper right of Stars was first described by Pacioli, and later rediscovered by Kepler, who gave it its astronomical name. H. S. M. Coxeter reports that the shape of the central chameleon cage in Stars had previously been described in 1900 by Max Brückner, whose book Vielecke und Vielflache includes a photograph of a model of the same shape. Coxeter, believing that Escher was not aware of this reference, wrote "It is remarkable that Escher, without any knowledge of algebra or analytic geometry, was able to rediscover this highly symmetrical figure." However, George W. Hart has documented that Escher was familiar with Brückner's book and based much of his knowledge of stellated polyhedra and polyhedral compounds on it.

== Analysis ==
Martin Beech interprets the many polyhedral compounds within Stars as corresponding to double stars and triple star systems in astronomy. Beech writes that, for Escher, the mathematical orderliness of polyhedra depicts the "stability and timeless quality" of the heavens, and similarly Marianne L. Teuber writes that Stars "celebrates Escher's identification with Johannes Kepler's neo-Platonic belief in an underlying mathematical order in the universe".

Alternatively, Howard W. Jaffe interprets the polyhedral forms in Stars crystallographically, as "brilliantly faceted jewels" floating through space, with its compound polyhedra representing crystal twinning. However, R. A. Dunlap points out the contrast between the order of the polyhedral forms and the more chaotic biological nature of the chameleons inhabiting them. In the same vein, Beech observes that the stars themselves convey tension between order and chaos: despite their symmetric shapes, the stars are scattered apparently at random, and vary haphazardly from each other. As Escher himself wrote about the central chameleon cage, "I shouldn't be surprised if it wobbles a bit."

== Related works ==
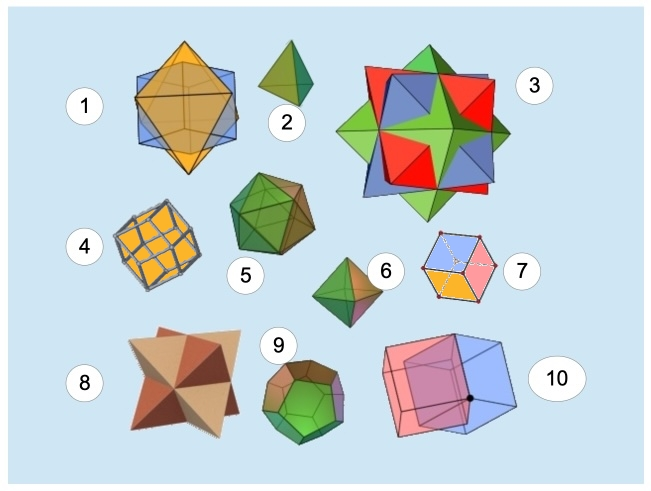
The shapes of Escher Study for Stars: 1. Octahedron and cube compound 2. Tetrahedron 3. Stellated rhombic dodecahedron, a compound of three octahedra, an Escher's solid 4. Rhombic dodecahedron 5. Regular icosahedron 6. Octahedron 7. Cube 8. Stella octangula 9. Regular dodecahedron 10. Two compound cubes

A closely related woodcut, Study for Stars, completed in August 1948, depicts wireframe versions of several of the same polyhedra and polyhedral compounds, floating in black within a square composition, but without the chameleons. The largest polyhedron shown in Study for Stars, a stellated rhombic dodecahedron, is also one of two polyhedra depicted prominently in Escher's 1961 print Waterfall.

The stella octangula, a compound of two tetrahedra that appears in the upper right of Stars, also forms the central shape of another of Escher's astronomical works, Double Planetoid (1949). The compound of cube and octahedron in the upper left was used earlier by Escher, in Crystal (1947).

Escher's later work Four Regular Solids (Stereometric Figure) returned to the theme of polyhedral compounds, depicting a more explicitly Keplerian form in which the compound of the cube and octahedron is nested within the compound of the dodecahedron and icosahedron.

== Collections and publications ==
Stars was used as cover art for the 1962 anthology Best Fantasy Stories edited by Brian Aldiss, and for a 1971 Italian edition of occult guidebook The Morning of the Magicians. It also formed the frontispiece for a 1996 textbook on crystallography.

As well as being exhibited in the Escher Museum, copies of Stars are in the permanent collections of the Rijksmuseum, National Gallery of Art, Mildred Lane Kemper Art Museum, Boston Public Library, and the National Gallery of Canada.
