= Mark McLachlan =

Product and game designer (born 1990)

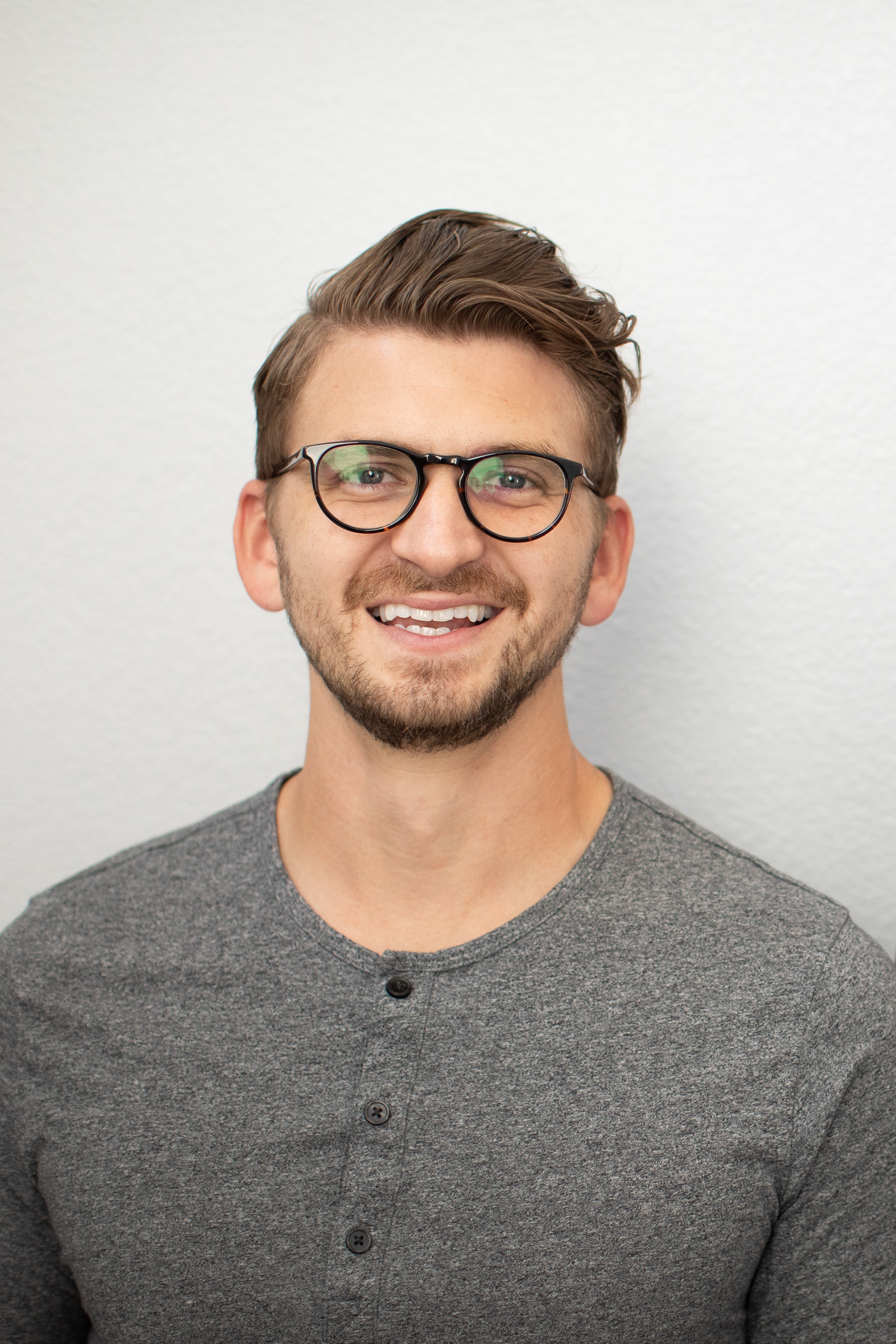
- McLachlan in 2020
- Born: February 27, 1990 (age 36) Cape Town, South Africa
- Occupation: Product and game designer

Mark McLachlan (born February 27, 1990) is a product and game designer. Mark has designed and released products under the scope of the product design and game publishing studio Antsy Labs. In collaboration with his brother, Matthew McLachlan, Mark invented the Fidget Cube, the second most-backed Kickstarter campaign in history.

== Biography ==
McLachlan began his career as co-founder of the e-commerce platform TinyLightbulbs, where he curated crowdfunded products in an online storefront.

Mark later focused his attention on the product and game design industry, launching the tabletop dexterity game Storm the Gate with his brother, Matthew McLachlan, in 2013.

In 2015, McLachlan co-founded Antsy Labs, a product design and game publishing studio based in Denver, Colorado. That year, Antsy Labs released the phone and smartwatch charging dock Duet.

In 2016, Mark McLachlan, partnered with brother and co-founder Matthew McLachlan, released their invention Fidget Cube, funded on Kickstarter. Fidget Cube is Kickstarter's second most-backed campaign ever with 154,926 backers.

While dealing with the overwhelming demand for Fidget Cube and the accompanying customer service workload, Mark and Matthew McLachlan co-founded the customer service platform HoneyBrandger in 2018, which provides on-demand support for companies looking to scale.

Mark again partnered with Matthew McLachlan to release the magnetic building block system PIXL in 2018.
