= Mind-wandering =

Experience of thoughts not remaining on a single topic for a long period of time

Mind-wandering is broadly defined as thoughts that are task-unrelated and stimulus-independent. This can take the form of three different subtypes: positive constructive daydreaming, guilty fear of failure, and poor attentional control. A common understanding of mind-wandering is the experience of thoughts not remaining on a single topic for a long period of time, particularly when people are engaged in an attention-demanding task.

One context in which mind-wandering often occurs is driving. This is because driving under optimal conditions becomes an almost automatic activity that can require minimal use of the task positive network, the brain network that is active when one is engaged in an attention-demanding activity. In situations where vigilance is low, people do not remember what happened in the surrounding environment because they are preoccupied with their thoughts. This is known as the decoupling hypothesis.

Studies using event-related potentials (ERPs) have shown that mind-wandering reduces the brain's processing of external information. When thoughts are unrelated to the task at hand, the brain processes both task-relevant and unrelated sensory information in a less detailed manner. Mind-wandering appears to be a stable trait of people and a transient state. Studies have linked performance problems in the laboratory and in daily life. Mind-wandering has been associated with possible car accidents. Mind-wandering is also intimately linked to states of affect. Studies indicate that task-unrelated thoughts are common in people with low or depressed mood. Mind-wandering also occurs when a person is intoxicated via the consumption of alcohol.

Studies have demonstrated a prospective bias to spontaneous thought because individuals tend to engage in more future than past related thoughts during mind-wandering. The default mode network is thought to be involved in mind-wandering and internally directed thought, although recent work has challenged this assumption. Nondirective meditation methods, like Acem Meditation, utilize the spontaneous mind-wandering tendencies of the mind. Therefore, such techniques may be less demanding and more effective than meditation methods that apply concentration.

== History ==
The history of mind-wandering research dates back to 18th century England. British philosophers struggled to determine whether mind-wandering occurred in the mind or if an outside source caused it. In 1921, Varendonck published The Psychology of Day-Dreams, in which he traced his "'trains of thoughts' to identify their origins, most often irrelevant external influences". Wallas (1926) considered mind-wandering as an important aspect of his second stage of creative thought – incubation. It was not until the 1960s that the first documented studies were conducted on mind-wandering. John Antrobus and Jerome L. Singer developed a questionnaire and discussed the experience of mind-wandering.

This questionnaire, known as the Imaginal Processes Inventory (IPI), provides a trait measure of mind-wandering and it assesses the experience on three dimensions: how vivid the person's thoughts are, how many of those thoughts are guilt- or fear-based, and how deep into the thought a person goes. As technology continues to develop, psychologists are starting to use functional magnetic resonance imaging to observe mind-wandering in the brain and reduce psychologists' reliance on verbal reports.

== Research methods ==
Jonathan Smallwood and colleagues popularized the study of mind-wandering using thought sampling and questionnaires. Mind-wandering is studied using experience sampling either online or retrospectively. One common paradigm within which to study mind-wandering is the SART (sustained attention to response task). In a SART task there are two categories of words. One of the categories are the target words. In each block of the task a word appears for about 300 ms, there will be a pause and then another word. When a target word appears the participant hits a designated key. About 60% of the time after a target word a thought probe will appear to gauge whether thoughts were on task. If participants were not engaged in the task they were experiencing task-unrelated thoughts (TUTs), signifying mind-wandering.

Another task to judge TUTs is the experience sampling method (ESM). Participants carry around a personal digital assistant (PDA) that signals several times a day. At the signal a questionnaire is provided. The questionnaire questions vary but can include: (a) whether or not their minds had wandered at the time of the (b) what state of control they had over their thoughts and (c) about the content of their thoughts. Questions about context are also asked to measure the level of attention necessary for the task. One process used was to give participants something to focus on and then at different times ask them what they were thinking about. Those who were not thinking about what was given to them were considered "wandering". Another process was to have participants keep a diary of their mind-wandering. Participants are asked to write a brief description of their mind-wandering and the time in which it happened. These methodologies are improvements on past methods that were inconclusive.

== Neuroscience ==
Mind-wandering is important in understanding how the brain produces what William James called the train of thought and the stream of consciousness. This aspect of mind-wandering research is focused on understanding how the brain generates the spontaneous and relatively unconstrained thoughts that are experienced when the mind wanders. One candidate neural mechanism for generating this aspect of experience is a network of regions in the medial frontal and medial parietal cortex known as the default mode network. This network of regions is highly active even when participants are resting with their eyes closed suggesting a role in generating spontaneous internal thoughts. One relatively controversial result is that periods of mind-wandering are associated with increased activation in both the default and executive system a result that implies that mind-wandering may often be goal oriented.

It is commonly assumed that the default mode network is known to be involved during mind-wandering. The default mode network is active when a person is not focused on the outside world and the brain is at wakeful rest because experiences such as mind-wandering and daydreaming are common in this state. It is also active when the individual is thinking about others, thinking about themselves, remembering the past, and planning for the future; however, 2010s studies show that signals in the default mode network provide information regarding patterns of detailed experience in active tasks states. This data suggests that the relationship between the default mode network and mind-wandering remains a matter of conjecture. In addition to neural models, computational models of consciousness based on Bernard Baars' Global Workspace theory suggest that mind-wandering, or "spontaneous thought" may involve competition between internally and externally generated activities attempting to gain access to a limited capacity central network.

== Individual differences ==
There are individual differences in some aspects of mind-wandering between older and younger adults. Although older adults reported less mind-wandering, these older participants showed the same amount of mind-wandering as younger adults. There were also differences in how participants responded to an error. After an error, older adults took longer to return focus back to the task when compared with younger adults. It is possible that older adults reflect more about an error due to conscientiousness.

Research has shown that older adults tend to be more conscientious than young adults. Personality can also affect mind-wandering. People that are more conscientious are less prone to mind-wandering. Being more conscientious allows people to stay focused on the task better which causes fewer instances of mind-wandering. Differences in mind-wandering between young and older adults may be limited because of this personality difference. Mental disorders such as ADHD (attention deficit hyperactivity disorder) are linked to mind-wandering. Seli et al. (2015) found that spontaneous mind-wandering, the uncontrolled or unwarranted shifting of attention, is a characteristic of those who have ADHD. However, they note that deliberate mind-wandering, or the purposeful shifting of one's attention to different stimuli, is not a consistent characteristic of having ADHD.

Franklin et al. (2016) arrived at similar conclusions; they had college students take multiple psychological evaluations that gauge ADHD symptom strength. Then, they had the students read a portion of a general science textbook. At various times and at random intervals throughout their reading, participants were prompted to answer a question that asked if their attention was either on task, slightly on task, slightly off task, or off task prior to the interruption. In addition, they were asked if they were aware, unaware, or neither aware nor unaware of their thoughts as they read. Lastly, they were tasked to press the space bar if they ever caught themselves mind-wandering. For a week after these assessments, the students answered follow-up questions that also gauged mind-wandering and awareness. This study's results revealed that students with higher ADHD symptomology showed less task-oriented control than those with lower ADHD symptomology. Additionally, those with lower ADHD symptomology were more likely to engage in useful or deliberate mind-wandering and were more aware of their inattention. One of the strengths of this study is that it was performed in both lab and daily-life situations, giving it broad application.

Pasternak Barami and Goldfarb (2025) found a positive correlation between ADHD symptoms and mind wandering even in kindergarten-aged children, with elevated mind wandering at this age predicting poorer performance on arithmetic and phonological tasks independently of ADHD symptom severity, suggesting that mind wandering may be a detectable cognitive marker in early childhood prior to formal diagnosis. Mind-wandering in and of itself is not necessarily indicative of attention deficiencies. Studies show that humans typically spend 25-50% of their time thinking about thoughts irrelevant to their current situations. In many disorders, it is the regulation of the overall amount of mind-wandering that is disturbed, leading to increased distractibility when performing tasks. Additionally, the contents of mind-wandering is changed; thoughts can be more negative and past-oriented, particularly unstable or self-centered.

== Working memory ==
Recent research has studied the relationship between mind-wandering and working memory capacity. Working memory capacity represents personal skill to have a good command of individual's mind. This relationship requires more research to understand how they influence one another. It is possible that mind-wandering causes lower performance on working memory capacity tasks or that lower working memory capacity causes more instances of mind-wandering.

Only the second of these has actually been proven. Reports of task-unrelated thoughts are less frequent when performing tasks that do not demand continuous use of working memory than tasks which do. Moreover, individual difference studies demonstrate that when tasks are non-demanding, high levels of working memory capacity are associated with more frequent reports of task-unrelated thinking, especially when it is focused on the future. By contrast, when performing tasks that demand continuous attention, high levels of working memory capacity are associated with fewer reports of task-unrelated thoughts.

Together these data are consistent with the claim that working memory capacity helps sustain a train of thought whether it is generated in response to a perceptual event or is self-generated by the individual. Therefore, under certain circumstances, the experience of mind-wandering is supported by working memory resources. Working memory capacity variation in individuals has been proven to be a good predictor of the natural tendency for mind-wandering to occur during cognitively demanding tasks and various activities in daily life. Mind-wandering sometimes occurs as a result of saccades, which are the movements of one's eyes to different visual stimuli. In an antisaccade task, for example, subjects with higher working memory capacity scores resisted looking at the flashing visual cue better than participants with lower working memory capacity. Higher working memory capacity is associated with fewer saccades toward environmental cues.

Mind-wandering has been shown to be related to goal orientation; people with higher working memory capacity keep their goals more accessible than those who have lower working memory capacity, thus allowing these goals to better guide their behavior and keep them on task. Another study compared differences in speed of processing information between people of different ages. The task they used was a go/no go task where participants responded if a white arrow moved in a specific direction but did not respond if the arrow moved in the other direction or was a different color. In this task, children and young adults showed similar speed of processing but older adults were significantly slower. Speed of processing information affects how much information can be processed in working memory. People with faster speed of processing can encode information into memory better than people that have slower speed of processing. This can lead to memory of more items because more things can be encoded.

== Retention ==
Mind-wandering affects retention where working memory capacity is directly related to reading comprehension levels. Participants with lower working memory capacity perform worse on comprehension-based tests. When investigating how mind-wandering affects retention of information, experiments are conducted where participants are asked a variety of questions about factual information, or deducible information while reading a detective novel. Participants are also asked about the state of their mind before the questions are asked. Throughout the reading itself, the author provides important cues to identify the villain, known as inference critical episodes (ICEs). The questions are asked randomly and before critical episodes are reached. It was found that episodes of mind-wandering, especially early on in the text led to decreased identification of the villain and worse results on both factual and deducible questions. Therefore, when mind-wandering occurs during reading, the text is not processed well enough to remember key information about the story. Furthermore, both the timing and the frequency of mind-wandering helps determine how much information is retained from the narrative.

== Reading comprehension ==
Reading comprehension must also be investigated in terms of text difficulty. To assess this, researchers provide an easy and hard version of a reading task. During this task, participants are interrupted and asked whether their thoughts at the time of interruption had been related or unrelated to the task. What is found is that mind-wandering has a negative effect on text comprehension in more difficult readings. This supports the executive-resource hypothesis which describes that both task related and task-unrelated thoughts (TUT) compete for executive function resources. Therefore, when the primary task is difficult, little resources are available for mind-wandering, whereas when the task is simple, the possibility for mind-wandering is abundant because it takes little executive control to focus on simple tasks; however, mind-wandering tends to occur more frequently in harder readings as opposed to easier readings. Therefore, it is possible that similar to retention, mind-wandering increases when readers have difficulty constructing a model of the story.

== Happiness ==
As part of his doctoral research at Harvard University, Matthew Killingsworth used an iPhone app that captured a user's feelings in real time. The tool alerts the user at random times and asks: "How are you feeling right now?" and "What are you doing right now?" Killingsworth and Gilbert's analysis suggested that mind-wandering was much more typical in daily activities than in laboratory settings. They also describe that people were less happy when their minds were wandering than when they were otherwise occupied. This effect was somewhat counteracted by people's tendency to mind-wander to happy topics, but unhappy mind-wandering was more likely to be rated as more unpleasant than other activities. The authors note that unhappy moods can also cause mind-wandering, but the time-lags between mind-wandering and mood suggests that mind-wandering itself can also lead to negative moods. Furthermore, research suggests that regardless of working memory capacity, subjects participating in mind-wandering experiments report more mind-wandering when bored, stressed, or unhappy.

== Executive functions ==
Executive functions (EFs) are cognitive processes that make a person pay attention or concentrate on a task. Three executive functions that relate to memory are inhibiting, updating and shifting. Inhibiting controls a person's attention and thoughts when distractions are abundant. Updating reviews old information and replaces it with new information in the working memory. Shifting controls the ability to go between multiple tasks. All three EFs have a relationship to mind-wandering.

Executive functions have roles in attention problems, attention control, thought control, and working memory capacity. Attention problems relate to behavioral problems such as inattention, impulsivity and hyperactivity. These behaviors make staying on task difficult leading to more mind-wandering. Higher inhibiting and updating abilities correlates to lower levels of attention problems in adolescence.

The inhibiting executive function controls attention and thought. The failure of cognitive inhibition is a direct cause of mind-wandering. Mind-wandering is also connected to working memory capacity (WMC). People with higher WMC mind-wander less on high concentration tasks no matter their boredom levels. People with low WMC are better at staying on task for low concentration tasks, but once the task increases in difficulty they had a hard time keeping their thoughts focused on task.

Updating takes place in the working memory, therefore those with low WMC have a lower updating executive function ability. That means a low performing updating executive function can be an indicator of high mind-wandering. Working memory relies on executive functions, with mind-wandering as an indicator of their failure. Task-unrelated thoughts (TUTs) are empirical behavioral manifestations of mind-wandering in a person. The longer a task is performed the more TUTs reported. Mind-wandering is an indication of an executive control failure that is characterized by TUTs. Metacognition serves to correct the wandering mind, suppressing spontaneous thoughts and bringing attention back to more "worthwhile" tasks.

== Fidgeting ==
Paul Seli and colleagues have shown that spontaneous mind-wandering is associated with increased fidgeting; by contrast, interest, attention and visual engagement lead to Non-Instrumental Movement Inhibition. One possible application for this phenomenon is that detection of non-instrumental movements may be an indicator of attention or boredom in computer aided learning. Traditionally, teachers and students have viewed fidgeting as a sign of diminished attention, which is summarized by the statement, "Concentration of consciousness, and concentration of movements, diffusion of ideas and diffusion of movements go together." However, James Farley and colleagues have proposed that fidgeting is not only an indicator of spontaneous mind-wandering, but is also a subconscious attempt to increase arousal in order to improve attention and thus reduce mind-wandering.

== See also ==
- Absent-mindedness
- ADHD predominantly inattentive
- Default mode network
- Highway hypnosis
- Human reliability
- Hyperfocus (antonym)
- Maladaptive daydreaming
- Mindstream
