= Jonathan Smallwood =

British psychologist and academic (1975–2025)

- Born: Jonathan Smallwood; 13 October 1975; Wolverhampton, England
- Died: 24 October 2025 (aged 50)
- Education: University of Strathclyde
- Occupation: Psychologist
- Known for: Mind-wandering
- Spouse: Helga Smallwood (née Reid)
- Parent(s): Howard and Jacqueline Smallwood
- Scientific career
- Workplaces: University of York
- Thesis: Task Unrelated Thought: Understanding the process of cognition (2002)
- Doctoral advisor: Marc Obonsawin
- Website: www.thinclab.ca

Jonathan Smallwood (13 October 1975 – 24 October 2025) was a British psychologist who was Professor in the Department of Psychology at Queen's University at Kingston in Ontario, Canada. His research used the tools of cognitive neuroscience to investigate the process by which the brain self generates thoughts not arising from perception, such as during the experience of mind-wandering and daydreaming. For the two years leading up to his death he was widely recognised as one of the world's most highly cited scientists.

== Education ==
The grandson of Joey Smallwood's cousin, Jonathan "Jonny" Smallwood earned his BA (1996) and PhD (2002) from the University of Strathclyde in Glasgow, Scotland. He was a lecturer in psychology at Glasgow Caledonian University (2002–2004) before travelling to the University of British Columbia as a post-doctoral researcher (2004–2006). From 2006 to 2008 he was a lecturer in psychology at the University of Aberdeen, after which Smallwood returned to North America to work with Jonathan Schooler as an assistant project scientist at the University of California, Santa Barbara. From 2011 to 2013 he was a senior researcher at the Max Planck Institute for Human Cognitive and Brain Sciences in the Department of Social Neuroscience. In August 2013, he joined the psychology department psychology at the University of York and in August 2018, he was promoted to professor. From July 2020 until his death, he held a professorship at Queen's University at Kingston.

== Academic career ==
Smallwood was a pioneer in the development of experience sampling methods and their integration with cognitive neuroscience methodologies, for example in the study of mind-wandering.

== Work ==
Smallwood proposed the decoupling hypothesis, referring to the observation that individuals report having no memory of what happened in the surrounding environment while preoccupied with their thoughts. In 2006, the publication of "The Restless Mind" discussed a psychological framework for controversies characterising cognitive neuroscience research into mind-wandering through the end of the decade.

== See also ==
- Default mode network
- Resting state fMRI
