= Fidgeting =

Type of involuntary movement

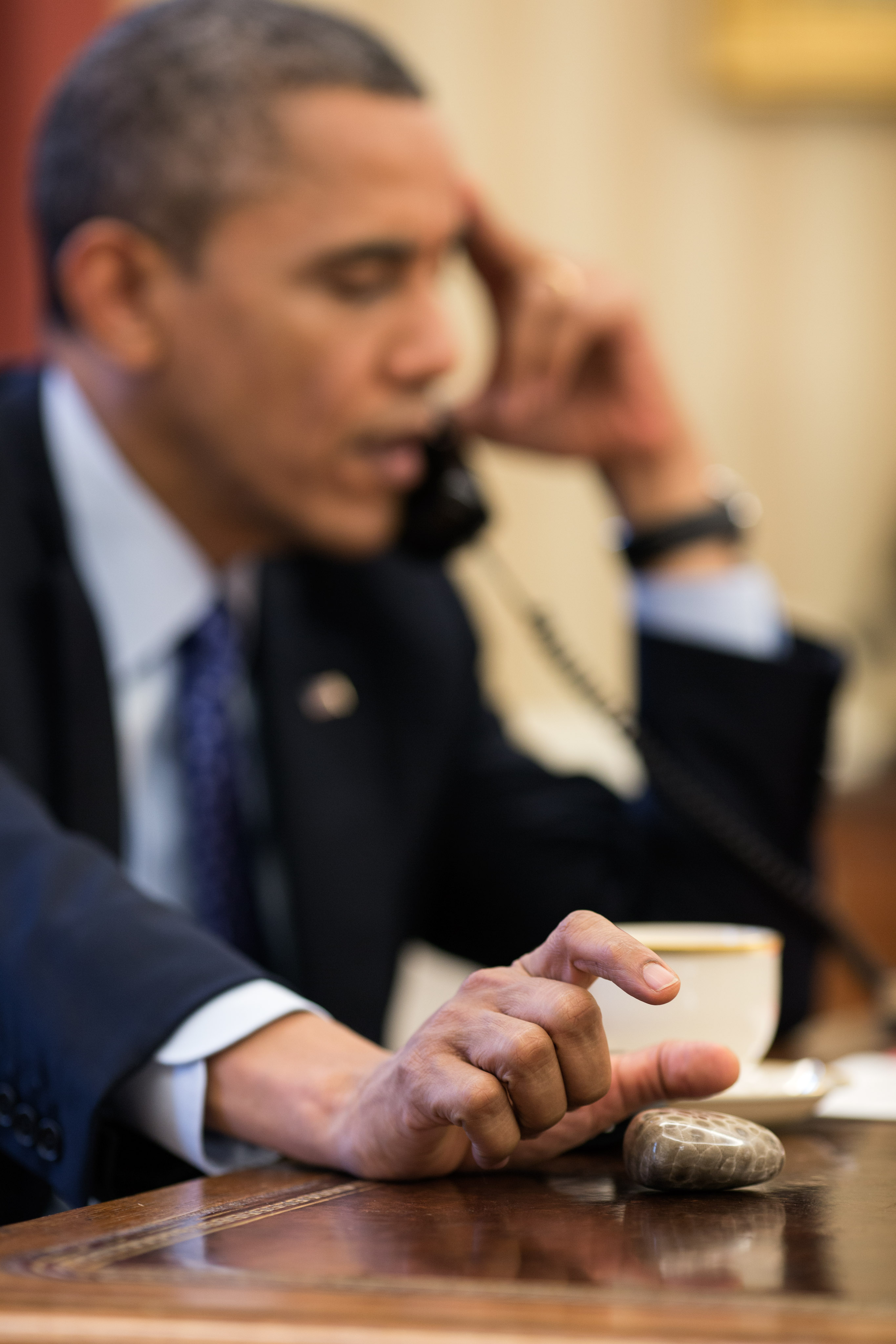
Barack Obama fidgeting with a Petoskey stone while on a phone call (2012)

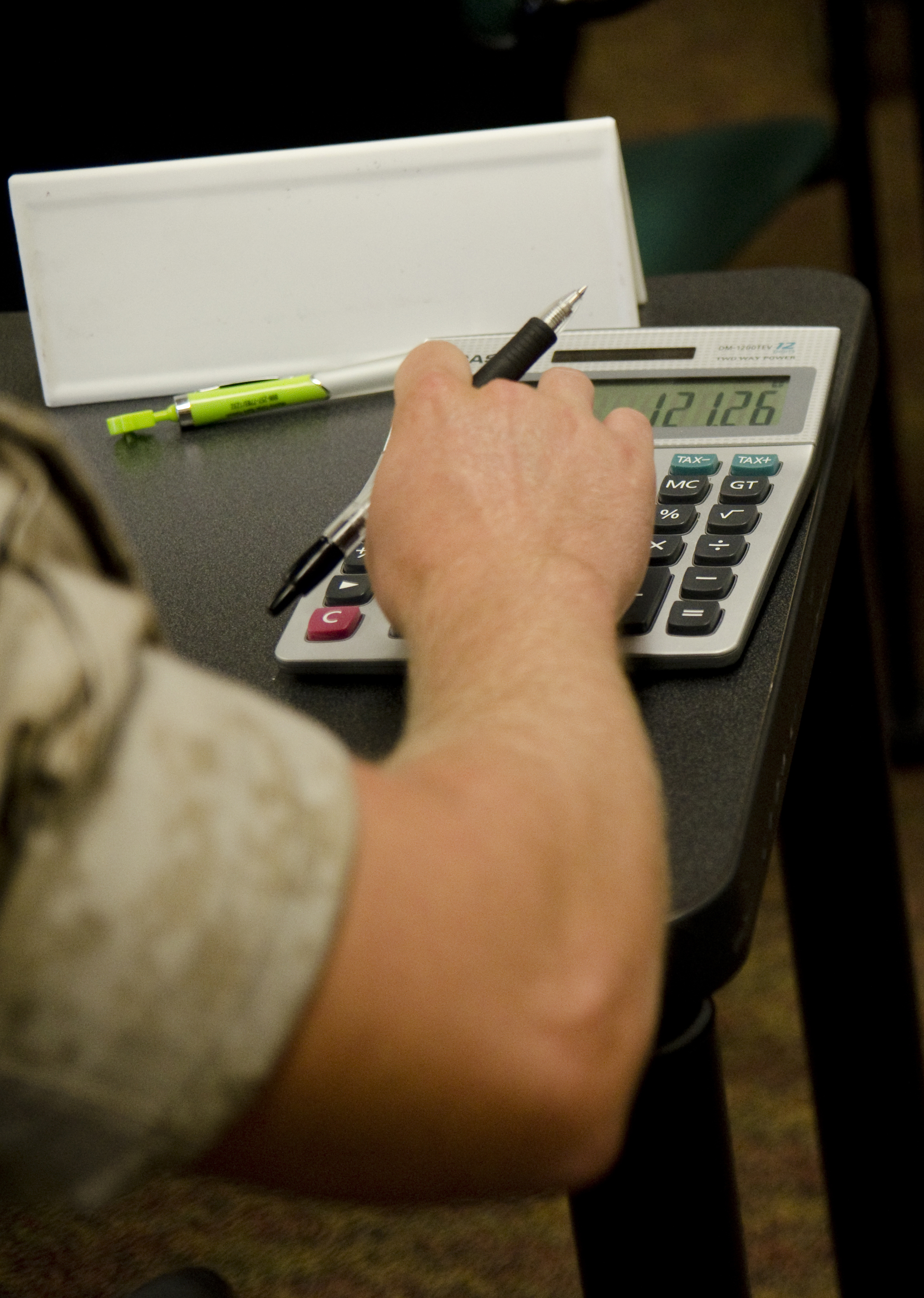
Shaking a pen while thinking is a common way of fidgeting.

Fidgeting is the act of moving about restlessly in a way that is not essential to ongoing tasks or events. Fidgeting may involve playing with one's fingers, hair, or personal objects (e.g. glasses, pens or items of clothing). In this sense, it may be considered twiddling or fiddling. Fidgeting is commonly used as a label for unexplained or subconscious activities and postural movements that people perform while seated or standing idle.

A common act of fidgeting is to bounce one's leg repeatedly. Rings are another common focus of fidgeting; variations include ring spinning, twirling or rolling along a table. Classrooms are sites of fidgeting, and traditionally teachers and students have viewed fidgeting as a sign of diminished attention. Toys have been invented to help with fidgeting. These fidget toys include fidget spinners.

== Causes and effects ==
Fidgeting may be a result of nervousness, frustration, agitation, boredom, ADHD, excitement, or a combination of these.

When interested in a task, a seated person will suppress their fidgeting, a process described as Non-Instrumental Movement Inhibition (NIMI). Some education researchers consider fidgeting, along with noise-making, as clear signs of inattention or low lecture quality, although educators point out that active engagement can take place without constantly directing attention to the instructor (i.e., engagement and attention are related but not equivalent). Fidgeting is often a subconscious act and is increased during spontaneous mind-wandering. Some researchers have proposed that fidgeting is not only an indicator of diminishing attention, but is also a subconscious attempt to increase arousal in order to improve attention. While inattention is strongly associated with poor learning and poor information recall, research by Dr. Karen Pine and colleagues found that children that are allowed to fidget with their hands performed better in memory and learning tests. A 2014 study also found that children with ADHD performed better on some cognitive tasks when they are engaged in "more intense [spontaneous] physical activity", although no such correlation was seen in children without ADHD.

Fidgeting is considered a component of a broad class of movement called non-exercise activity thermogenesis.

Fidgeting may be a result of genetics and some are born with a propensity to be fidgety. Fidgeting can also be a medical sign, as seen in hyperthyroidism. Hyperthyroid patients may be restless, become agitated easily, display fine tremors, and have trouble concentrating.

== Fidget toys ==
There are several devices that aim to aid fidgeting, including fidget cubes, fidget spinners, fidget sticks (kururin), and fidget pens. These "fidget toys" are typically intended to help students with autism or ADHD focus better, and come with a variety of buttons and switches that can be played with by the user.

== See also ==
- Doodle
- Stereotypy
- Stimming
