= First stellation of the rhombic dodecahedron =

Self-intersecting polyhedron with 12 faces

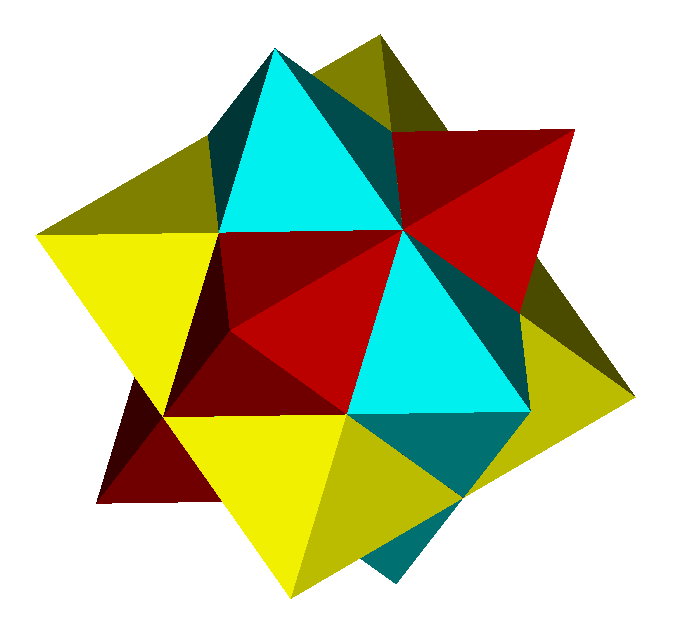
Escher's solid. This image does not depict the stellation, because different visible parts of a single hexagonal face of the stellation have different colors. However, the coloring is consistent with a depiction of the polyhedral compound of three flattened octahedra.

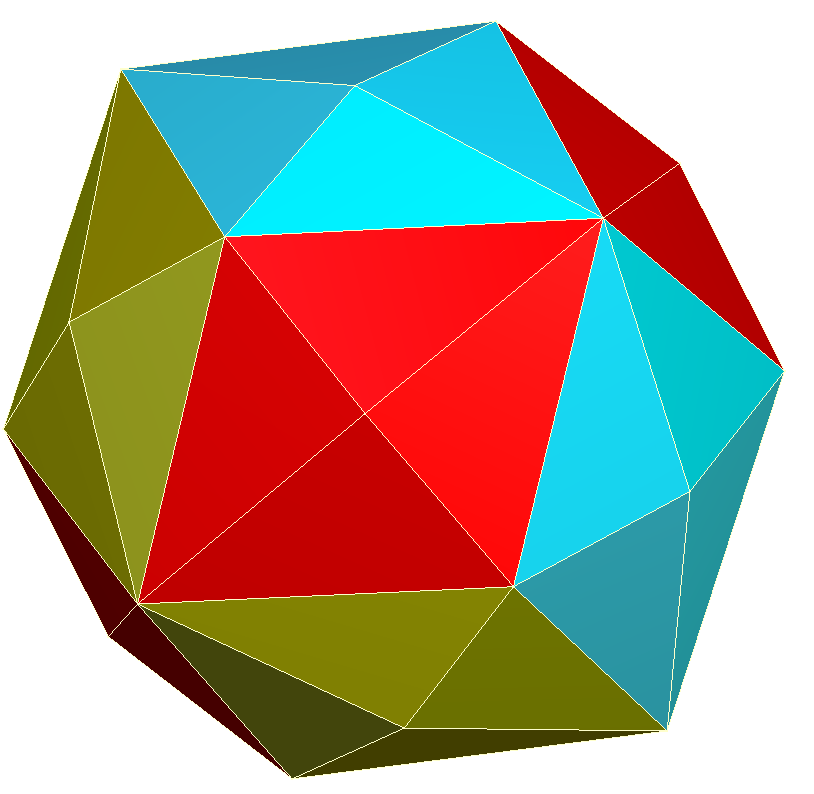
Escher's solid is topologically equivalent to the disdyakis dodecahedron, a Catalan solid, which can be seen as a rhombic dodecahedron with shorter rhombic pyramids augumented to each face.

In geometry, the first stellation of the rhombic dodecahedron is a self-intersecting polyhedron with 12 faces, each of which is a non-convex hexagon. It is a stellation of the rhombic dodecahedron and has the same outer shell and the same visual appearance as two other shapes: a solid, Escher's solid, with 48 triangular faces, and a polyhedral compound of three flattened octahedra with 24 overlapping triangular faces.

Escher's solid can tessellate space to form the stellated rhombic dodecahedral honeycomb.

== Stellation, solid, and compound ==
The first stellation of the rhombic dodecahedron has 12 faces, each of which is a non-convex hexagon. It is a stellation of the rhombic dodecahedron, meaning that each of its faces lies in the same plane as one of the rhombus faces of the rhombic dodecahedron, with each face containing the rhombus in the same plane, and that it has the same symmetries as the rhombic dodecahedron. It is the first stellation, meaning that no other self-intersecting polyhedron with the same face planes and the same symmetries has smaller faces. Extending the faces outwards even farther in the same planes leads to two more stellations, if the faces are required to be simple polygons.

STL model of the first stellation of the rhombic dodecahedron decomposed into 12 pyramids and 4 half-cubes

For polyhedra formed only using faces in the same 12 planes and with the same symmetries, but with the faces allowed to become non-simple or with multiple faces in a single plane, additional possibilities arise. In particular, removing the inner rhombus from each hexagonal face of the stellation leaves four triangles, and the resulting system of 48 triangles forms a different non-convex polyhedron without self-intersections that forms the boundary of a solid shape, sometimes called Escher's solid. This shape appears in M. C. Escher's works Waterfall and in a study for Stars (although Stars itself features a different shape, the compound of three octahedra). As the stellation and the solid have the same visual appearance, it is not possible to determine which of the two Escher intended to depict in Waterfall. In Study for Stars, Escher depicts the polyhedron in a skeletal form, and includes edges that are part of the skeletal form of Escher's solid but are not part of the stellation. (In the stellation, these line segments are formed by crossings of faces rather than edges.) However, an alternative interpretation for the same skeletal form is that it depicts a third shape with a similar appearance, the polyhedral compound of three flattened octahedra with 24 overlapping triangular faces.

The 48 triangular faces of the solid are isosceles; if the longest edge of these triangles is length $s$ then the other two are $\tfrac{\sqrt{3}}{2}s$, the surface area of the solid is $12\sqrt{2}s^2$ and the volume of the solid is $4s^3$.

== Vertices, edges, and faces ==
The vertices of the first stellation of the rhombic dodecahedron include the 12 vertices of the cuboctahedron, together with eight additional vertices (the degree-3 vertices of the rhombic dodecahedron). Escher's solid has six additional vertices, at the center points of the square faces of the cuboctahedron (the degree-4 vertices of the rhombic dodecahedron). In the first stellation of the rhombic dodecahedron, these six points are not vertices, but are instead the midpoints of pairs of edges that cross at right angles at these points.

The first stellation of the rhombic dodecahedron has 12 hexagonal faces, 36 edges, and 20 vertices, yielding an Euler characteristic of 20 − 36 + 12 = −4. Escher's solid instead has 48 triangular faces, 72 edges, and 26 vertices, yielding an Euler characteristic of 26 − 72 + 48 = 2.

== Tessellation ==
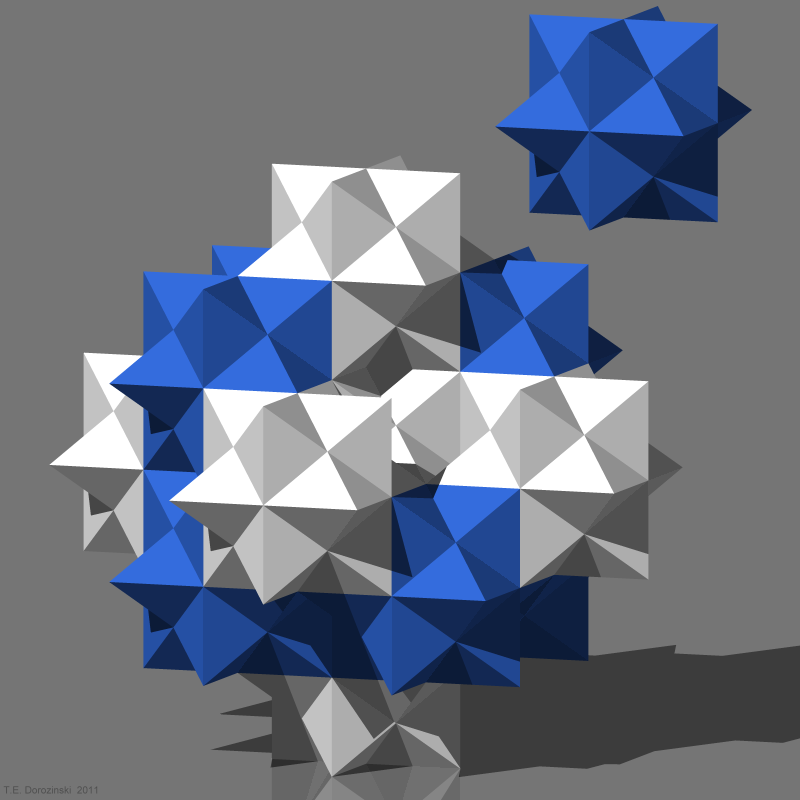
Tesselation of space with Escher's solids

Escher's solid can tessellate space in the stellated rhombic dodecahedral honeycomb. Six solids meet at each vertex. This honeycomb is cell-transitive, edge-transitive and vertex-transitive.

The Yoshimoto Cube, a dissection puzzle between a cube and two copies of Escher's solid, is closely related to this tessellation.
