= Everyday carry =

Useful items carried on person every day

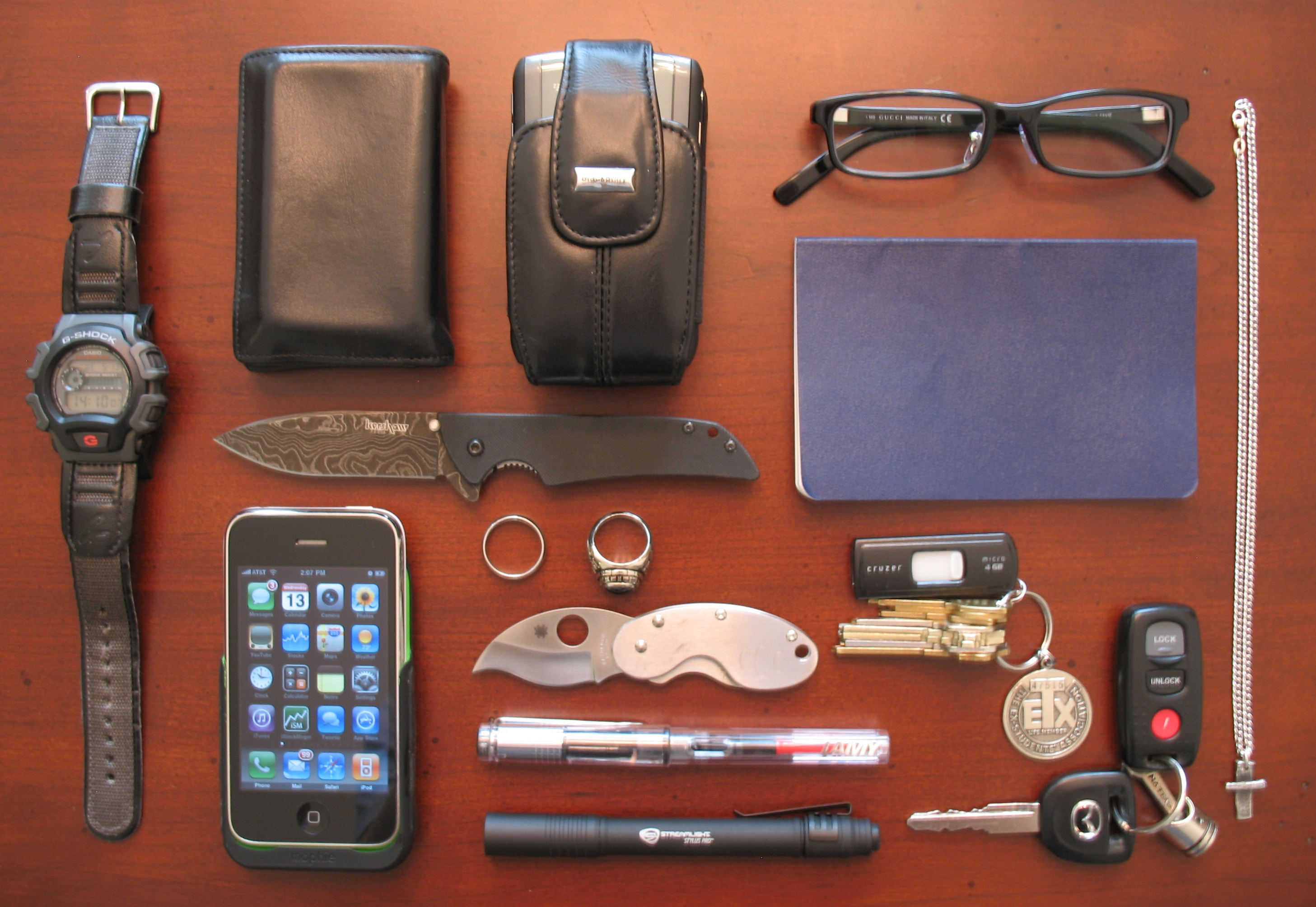
One person's everyday carry objects in 2009, laid out in a knolled arrangement

Everyday carry (EDC) or every-day carry is a collection of useful items that are consistently carried on person every day. The main reasons for having EDC are utility (usefulness), self-sufficiency, and preparedness: to help individuals improve simple everyday problem solving, from the mundane (opening packages, minor repairs) to possible emergency situations such as first aid or self-defense.

== Preparedness ==
Some of the most common EDC items are watches, pens, wallets, knives, firearms, flashlights, lighters, car and home key rings, mobile phones, multi-tools, tissues, medications, and personal care items.

The choice and priority/ranking of which items to carry, and how or where to carry them, vary according to each person's needs depending on their occupation, avocations, lifestyle, and similar factors of everyday life. Goals include being able to solve everyday problems more efficiently and to be an asset instead of a liability or helpless bystander when a problem arises.

While often distributed among pockets in everyday clothing, carry options are frequently expanded by the addition of clothing accessories like a fanny pack, purse, EDC pouch, small daypack, sunglasses, bracelets, or even footwear like long boots or a vest with pockets. How EDC items are stored, though, depends on the purpose and intention for their use.

== EDC as a subculture ==
The optimization of everyday carry (kit/layouts and carry modes) has become an internet subculture, which goes by the name EDC as well. The hobby overlaps with collecting, as many EDC enthusiasts are drawn into collecting EDC items in the quest for finding which one works best for their current EDC needs or for imagined scenarios, such as a light-duty day, a heavy-duty day, etc. The collecting of tools takes on an art appreciation component as fans appreciate the design cues, material choices, and craftsmanship that went into each model of tool, including trade-offs of costs versus benefits for each aspect of it. Many accessories manufacturers have capitalized on the trend and often describe their products in terms of EDC. "The best tool is the one that you have on you when you need one," is a common aphorism which argues against excessive optimization of the tools carried, due to diminishing returns.

== Legislation ==
Depending on the jurisdiction, certain EDC items may be restricted in public. Issues may include concealed carry of firearms or knives, airport security situations and, in the UK, the Theft Act 1968 offence of "going equipped to steal".

== See also ==
- Civil defense – Protection of citizens from disasters and military attack
- Bug-out bag – Emergency equipment
- Mini survival kit – Small kit containing essential survival tools
- First aid kit – Collection of supplies and equipment that is used to give medical treatment
- Emergency management – Dealing with all humanitarian aspects of emergencies
- Military surplus – Obsolete or obsolescent military goods usually offered for sale
- Self-preservation – Behaviors that ensure an organism's survival
- Survivalism – Movement of individuals or households preparing for emergencies and natural disasters
- Fidget toy – Object used for fidgeting or stimming with the hands
- Techwear
