= Fidget toy =

Object used for fidgeting or stimming with the hands

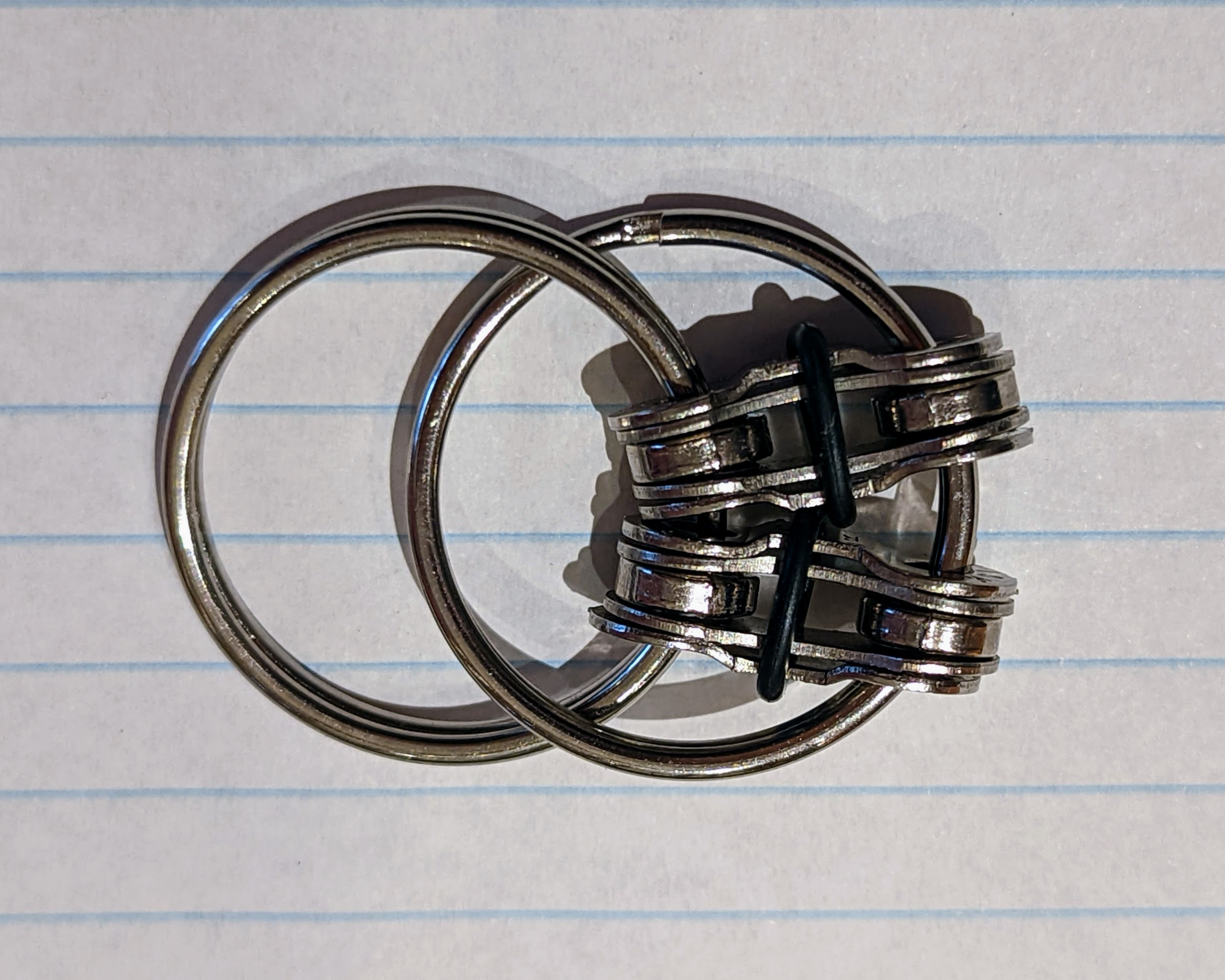
A "flippy chain"–type fidget toy

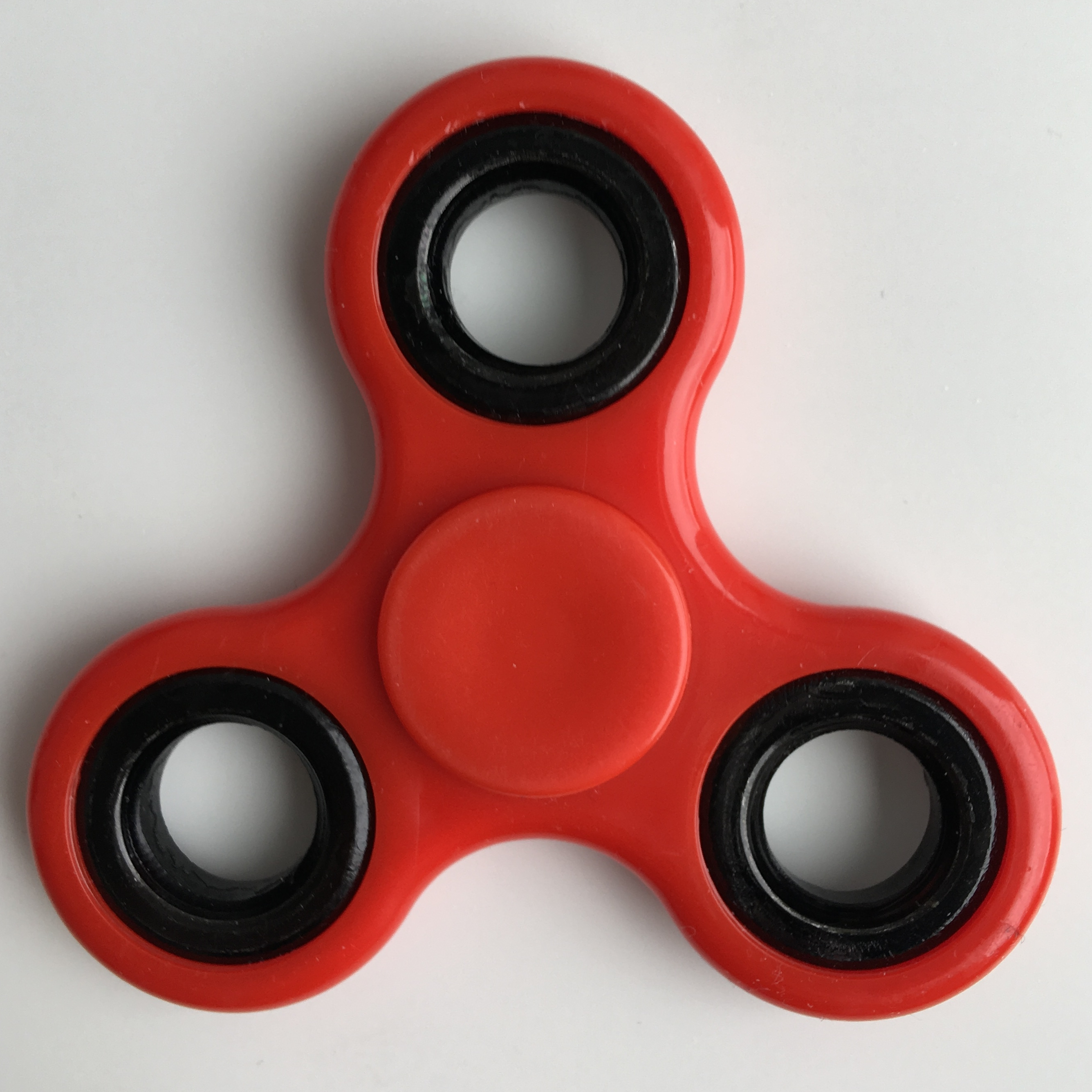
A fidget spinner

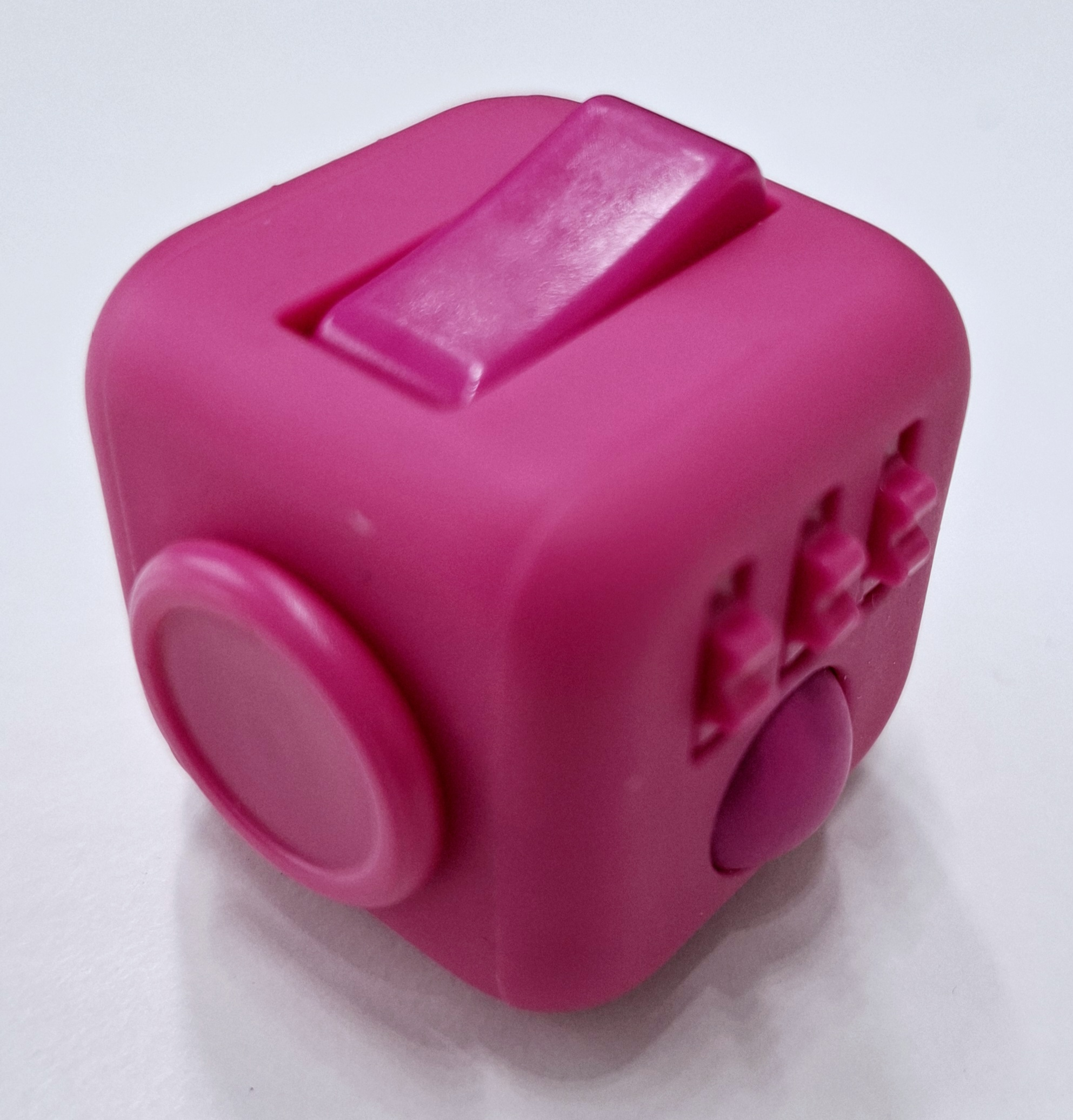
A Fidget Cube with clicking, flipping and spinning parts

A fidget toy, fidget tool, finger gadget, or just fidget, is typically a small object used for pleasant activity with the hands (manual fidgeting or stimming). Some users believe these items help them tolerate anxiety, frustration, agitation, boredom, and excitement. They are also commonly used by those with sensory difficulties. Fidget toys have uses in both therapeutic and educational settings, although some controversies about their safety and effectiveness have been brought up over the years.

Fidgets such as worry beads and Baoding balls have long existed, but the types and popularity have dramatically increased since the fidget spinner fad in 2017. Other types of fidget toys include the Fidget Cube, stress balls, and Pop Its.

A fidget toy can be designed to have a humorous aspect to its play, such as bath toys like “water snakes” (Note: Also called “slippery snakes” and “water wigglers”), which slip out of a player’s grip, or gel animal keychains which ‘poop’ when squeezed.

== Uses and effectiveness ==
=== Therapeutic uses ===
In therapeutic contexts, fidget toys are employed to help individuals manage sensory, cognitive, and emotional experiences. Stimming, or self-stimulatory behavior, is a common way for autistic or ADHD individuals to cope with overwhelming sensory input. Fidget toys can facilitate this process, offering a safe and effective means of processing stimuli, helping individuals reduce stress and anxiety levels. Studies have shown that using fidget toys can provide sensory input that helps individuals self-regulate, leading to improved emotional stability and reduced episodes of overstimulation. According to autism-based psychotherapy practices, therapists often incorporate fidget toys into sessions to help clients, including children and adults on the autism spectrum, engage with their senses in a mindful manner. For example, therapists may offer clients options for fidget toys and guide them through a mindful exploration of the sensations associated with their use, providing a grounding activity that supports emotional regulation. This approach has been found to be particularly effective in helping clients reduce anxiety and improve focus during therapy sessions, ultimately aiding in the development of coping mechanisms for managing stress.

=== Educational uses ===
In educational settings, fidgets are often used as tools to help children, particularly those with attention-related challenges, maintain focus during lessons. Research suggests that parents of autistic children tend to perceive fidget toys, including fidget spinners, as effective tools for reducing anxiety and enhancing focus. The effectiveness of fidget toys in educational environments is attributed to their ability to provide sensory input that helps children channel excess energy and improve their concentration on tasks. A recent study found that parents of autistic children with higher sensory-seeking scores noted significant benefits from fidget toys in terms of anxiety reduction, while fidget spinners were seen as more distracting compared to other fidget toys. Similarly, parents of typically developing children with high sensory-seeking scores perceived fidget toys as helpful for increasing their child's ability to concentrate.

The implications of these findings suggest that educators should take parental perspectives into account when forming policies regarding the use of fidget toys in the classroom. While some schools have banned these toys due to concerns about distraction, there is evidence to support their positive impact on children with specific sensory needs, especially in promoting focus and reducing anxiety. The use of fidget toys has been found to help students who struggle with sitting still or maintaining attention by providing a controlled outlet for movement, thereby improving their ability to engage with classroom activities. Consequently, policies that incorporate individualized approaches may be more effective in balancing the needs of all students, ensuring that those who benefit from fidget toys have access to them while minimizing potential distractions for others.

=== Other benefits ===
While fidget toys are most commonly used in classroom settings, they have a wide variety of other uses. They can be used as toys for simple entertainment, to make distressing events less overwhelming, as a way to bond with other children, or even to incentivize autistic children to complete day-to-day tasks. Many parents individualize the use of fidget spinners and other fidget toys to meet the specific needs of their children.

== Controversies and limitations ==
With the rise of fidget toys in popularity, some controversies emerged. One concerning pattern was reports of fidget toy-related injuries in children, which were largely related to children ingesting fidget toys or even putting them in their eyes. Some examples of injuries include a 9-year-old girl who suffered from moderate erosions in the corneal epithelium of the eye after putting a round popping fidget toy in it, a 7-year-old girl who suffered from eyeball perforations and unilateral vision loss caused by an uncontrolled fidget spinner, and a child who suffered from a stress injury from continuously playing with a fidget spinner for 8 hours. Choking hazards were a large concern for many fidget toys as well – particularly for those with moving pieces or small ball bearings – due to their marketing towards children.

Some professionals also question the effectiveness of fidget toys, in both therapeutic and educational settings. Studies investigating the effectiveness of fidget toys have had mixed results; some examples of those challenging the effectiveness of fidget toys include a 2022 study done on third graders with attention problems found that fidget cubes did not improve their ability to independently get work done, a 2023 study which found that fidgeting and doodling in general did not improve college students' focus or ability to retain boring information, and another 2023 study found that bouncy bands and fidget spinners did not help improve attention in academic settings, even in children who presented with greater inattention struggles.

Along with safety and effectiveness concerns, fidget toys come with a risk of distraction in school settings. In fact, shortly after skyrocketing to popularity in 2017, fidget spinners were banned in 32% of United States' top 200 biggest high schools – public and private – for questions around effectiveness, safety, and distractibility. Teachers are some of the biggest critics, citing jealousy between students, fidget toys being used for fun instead of focusing, and even visual or noise distractions with certain fidget toys as some of the main problems.

== See also ==
- Everyday carry (EDC)
- Infinity cube
- Prayer beads
