= Gary Dahl (businessman) =

American businessman and entrepreneur (1936–2015)

- Born: Gary Ross Dahl; December 18, 1936; Bottineau, North Dakota, U.S.
- Died: March 23, 2015 (aged 78); Jacksonville, Oregon, U.S.
- Education: Washington State University
- Occupations: Businessman; copywriter
- Known for: Pet Rock
- Spouse: Marguerite Dahl
- Children: 3

Gary Ross Dahl (December 18, 1936 – March 23, 2015) was an American businessman and advertising director. He founded and created the collectable toy Pet Rock—smooth stones from the city of Rosarito, Baja California, Mexico, in the mid-1970s—which was successful enough to make him a millionaire.

== Early life ==
Dahl was born on December 18, 1936, in Bottineau, North Dakota, and raised in Spokane, Washington. His mother was a waitress and his father was a lumber-mill worker. He studied at Washington State University. He worked as a freelance copy editor.

== Career ==
=== Pet Rock ===
By 1975, Dahl was living in Los Gatos, California, and still worked in copy editing. He reportedly came up with the concept of a pet rock while at a bar with friends in April. After they discussed the effort involved in taking care of pets, Dahl, joking, told them that his pet rock required little to no care. Dahl soon decided that he could turn the idea into a profitable novelty; in the weeks that followed, he wrote a 36-page instruction book, got two people to invest in the product, and purchased "Mexican beach stones".

Dahl began selling the rocks in August, and two months later was reportedly selling 10,000 a day in the lead-up to the holiday season. He sold an estimated 1.3 to 1.5 million rocks. The craze made Dahl a minor celebrity; it was widely covered in the media, he was on The Tonight Show twice, and received so many calls he later said he “taught my P.R. guy to impersonate me so he could also answer my calls.” The fad only lasted about half a year, the product's investors took Dahl to court and made him pay additional compensations, and by February 1976 the rocks were not selling well, but that was enough to make Dahl a millionaire.

=== Later career ===
From the proceeds of his "pets," in 1977 Dahl opened a bar in Los Gatos, California, which he jokingly named "Carrie Nation's Saloon" after Carrie Nation, a radical member of the temperance movement.

He attempted to follow up his pet rock success by selling "Canned Earthquakes", "Sand Breeding Kits" and "Red China Dirt," ostensibly a facetious plan to smuggle mainland China into the US, one cubic centimeter at a time. These novelties failed to attract as much interest as the Pet Rock. Dahl's agency, Gary Dahl Creative Services, in Campbell, California, specialized in electronic advertising. He wrote and produced television and radio commercials for a wide variety of businesses.

In 2000, Dahl won the Bulwer-Lytton Fiction Contest, the San José State University–sponsored competition that awards authors for crafting particularly bad "purple prose." He defeated over 4,000 entries from all over the world. Dahl's winning entry:

The heather-encrusted Headlands, veiled in fog as thick as smoke in a crowded pub, hunched precariously over the moors, their rocky elbows slipping off land's end, their bulbous, craggy noses thrust into the thick foam of the North Sea like bearded old men falling asleep in their pints.

In 2001, he published Advertising for Dummies.

== Personal life ==
Dahl lived in the hills above Los Gatos and owned another house in Milpitas, California.

He died on March 23, 2015, in Jacksonville, Oregon, of chronic obstructive pulmonary disease.

== Bibliography ==
- Dahl, Gary (2007). Advertising For Dummies. For Dummies. ISBN 978-0470045831.
