= Yoshimoto Cube =

Polyhedral mechanical puzzle toy

- Type: Dissection puzzle
- Invented by: Yoshimoto Naoki
- Company: Museum of Modern Art
- Availability: 1971–present

The Yoshimoto Cube is a polyhedral mechanical puzzle toy invented in 1971 by Naoki Yoshimoto (吉本直貴, Yoshimoto Naoki), who discovered that two stellated rhombic dodecahedra could be pieced together into a cube when he was finding different ways he could split a cube equally in half. Yoshimoto first introduced his cube in 1972 at a solo exhibition entitled "From Cube to Space", and later developed three commercial versions. In 1982, Yoshimoto Cube No. 1 was included in the Museum of Modern Art's permanent collection.

The cube is made up of eight interconnected cubes which can be folded or unfolded indefinitely, in the same manner as an infinity cube. The unfolded cube can also be split into two parts and reassembled into two stellated rhombic dodecahedra, each of which comprise half the volume of the original cube, making it a kind of three-dimensional dissection puzzle.

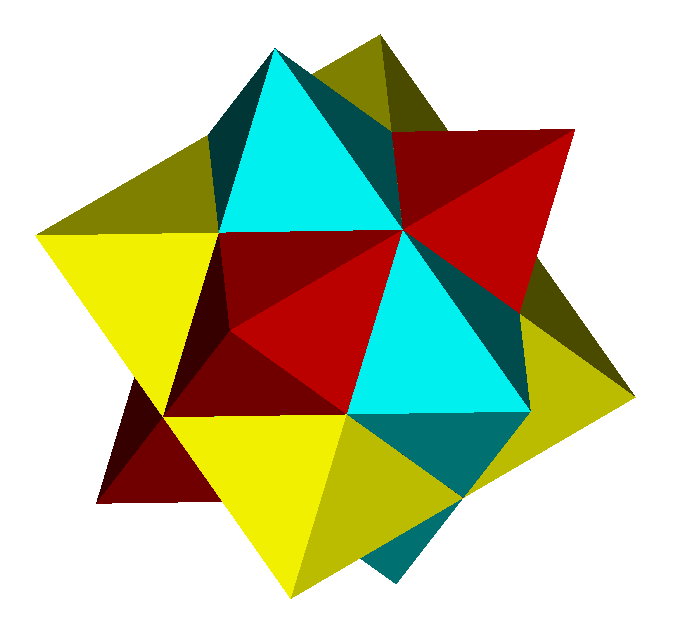
stellated rhombic dodecahedron

2×2×2 cube form of Yoshimoto Cube

STL model of the first stellation of the rhombic dodecahedron decomposed into pyramids and half-cubes

== See also ==
- Rubik's Cube
- n-dimensional sequential move puzzles
