= Worry stone =

Small stones rubbed for anxiety

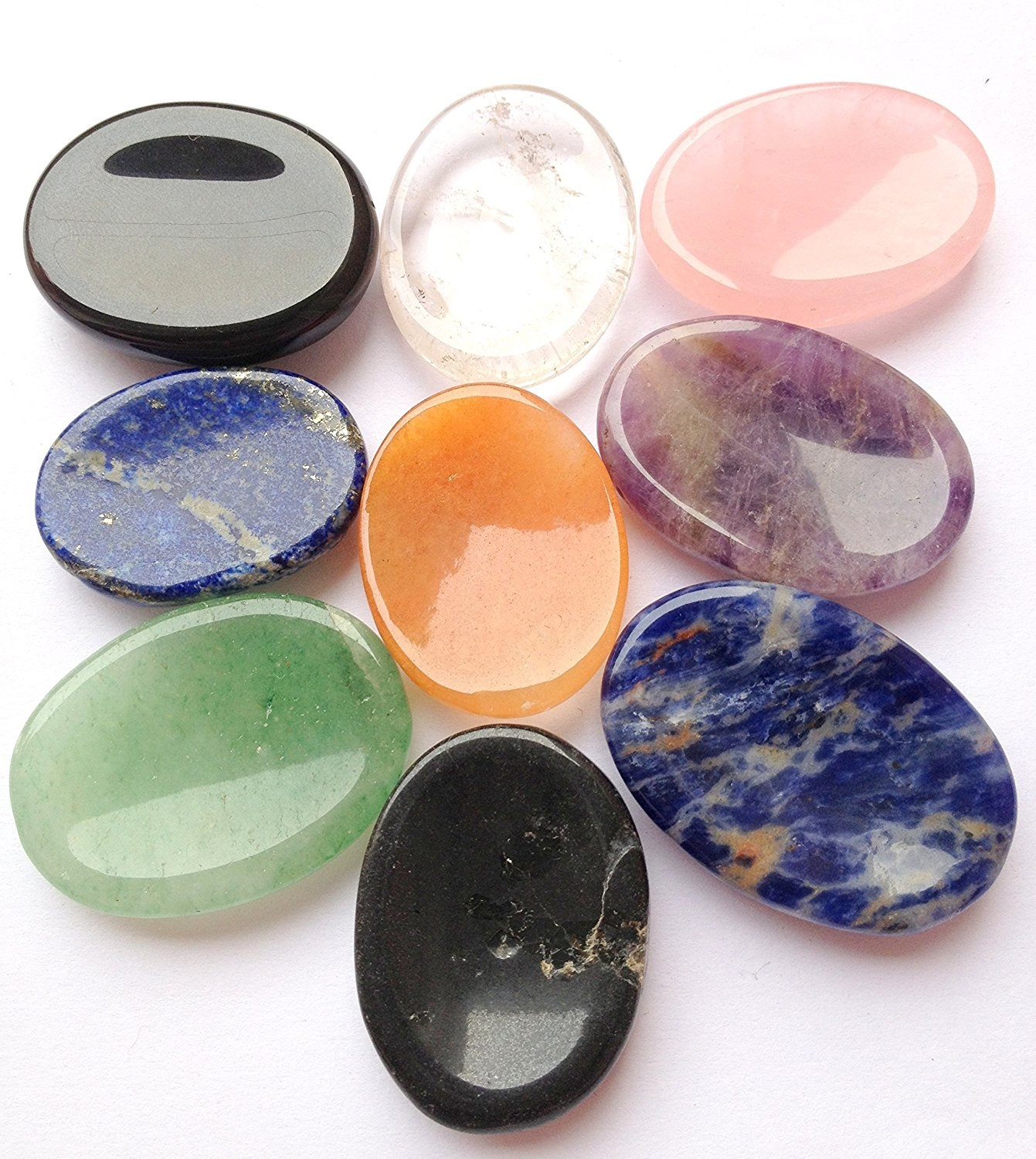
Worry stones

Worry stones are smooth, polished gemstones, usually in the shape of an oval with a thumb-sized indentation, used for relaxation or anxiety relief. Worry stones are typically around 3 centimetres (1 in) in size. They are used by holding the stone between the index finger and thumb and gently moving the thumb back and forth across it. The action of moving one's thumb back and forth across the stone is thought to reduce stress, but there is no conclusive scientific evidence to support this.

Worry stones may also be called palm stones, thumb stones, fidget stones, soothing stones, or sensory stones.

== History ==
As a folk practice implement, worry stones have many origins. Variations on the concept originate in ancient Greece, Tibet, Ireland, and multiple Native American tribes. The concept of a worry stone began by the simple action of picking a smooth stone and fiddling with the stone. Worry stones made by sea water were generally used by Ancient Greeks. The smoothness of the stone was most often created naturally by running water.

== Usage ==
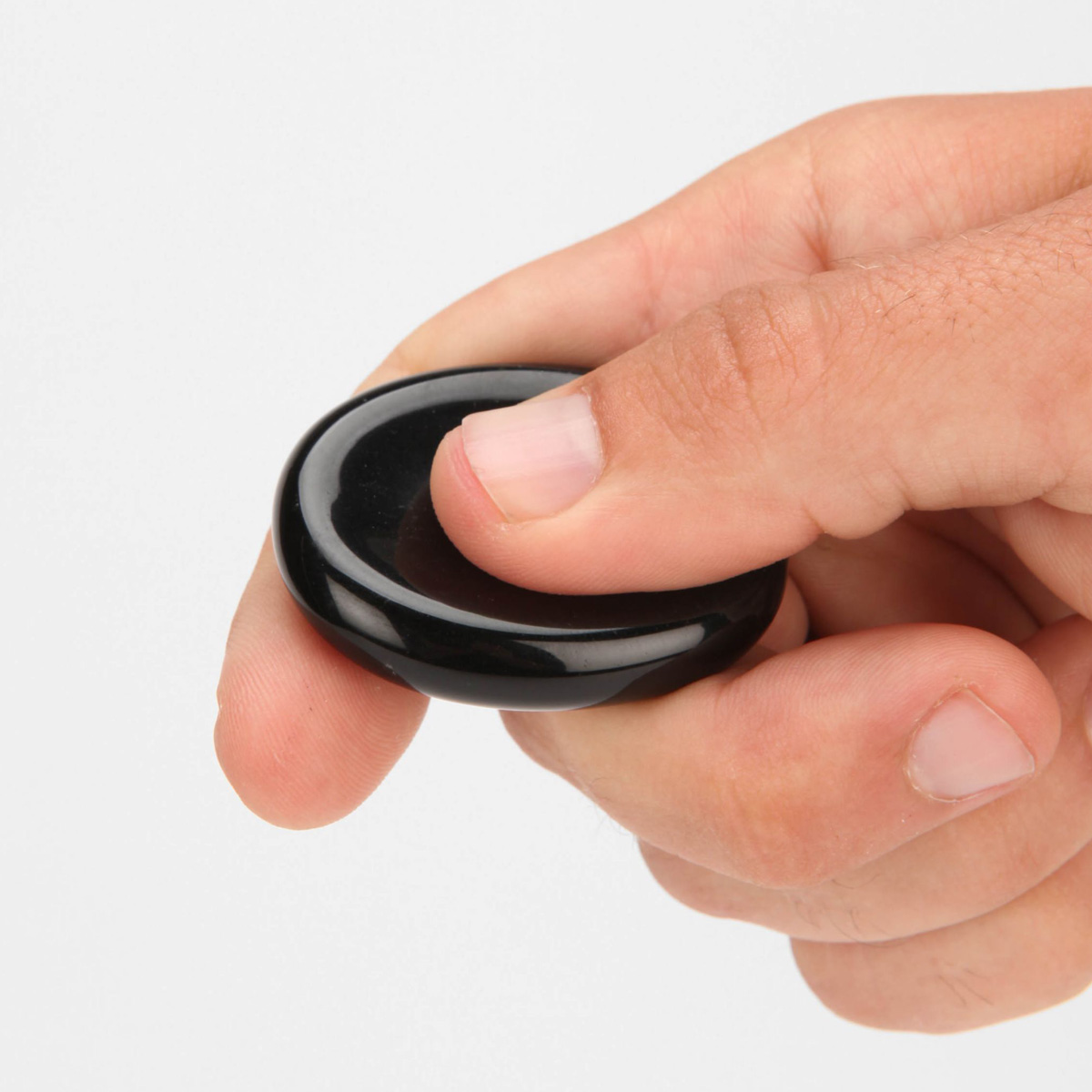
How to hold a worry stone

From the perspective of cognitive behavioral therapy, the use of worry stones is one of many folk practices that can function as psychologically healthy self-soothing exercises. Such techniques are taught at an early stage of treatment, displacing any familiar yet destructive coping methods (e.g., nail-biting, scratching, lip-biting, etc.) the patient may have developed. This helps ready the patient to confront anxiety or psychological trauma safely. Worry stones are simple and intuitive enough to be useful in therapeutic contexts where complexity and unfamiliarity are paramount concerns, such as when offering short-term treatment to refugees. After a patient has mastered a more sophisticated relaxation script for anxiety management, the worry stone itself can serve as a physical relaxation script reminder; the patient may notice an impulse to use the object, and thereby become aware of their own anxiety.

== See also ==
- Fidget Cube
- Fidget spinner
- Kombolói – Greek worry beads
- Mood ring
- Stress ball
