= Fidget Cube =

Toy

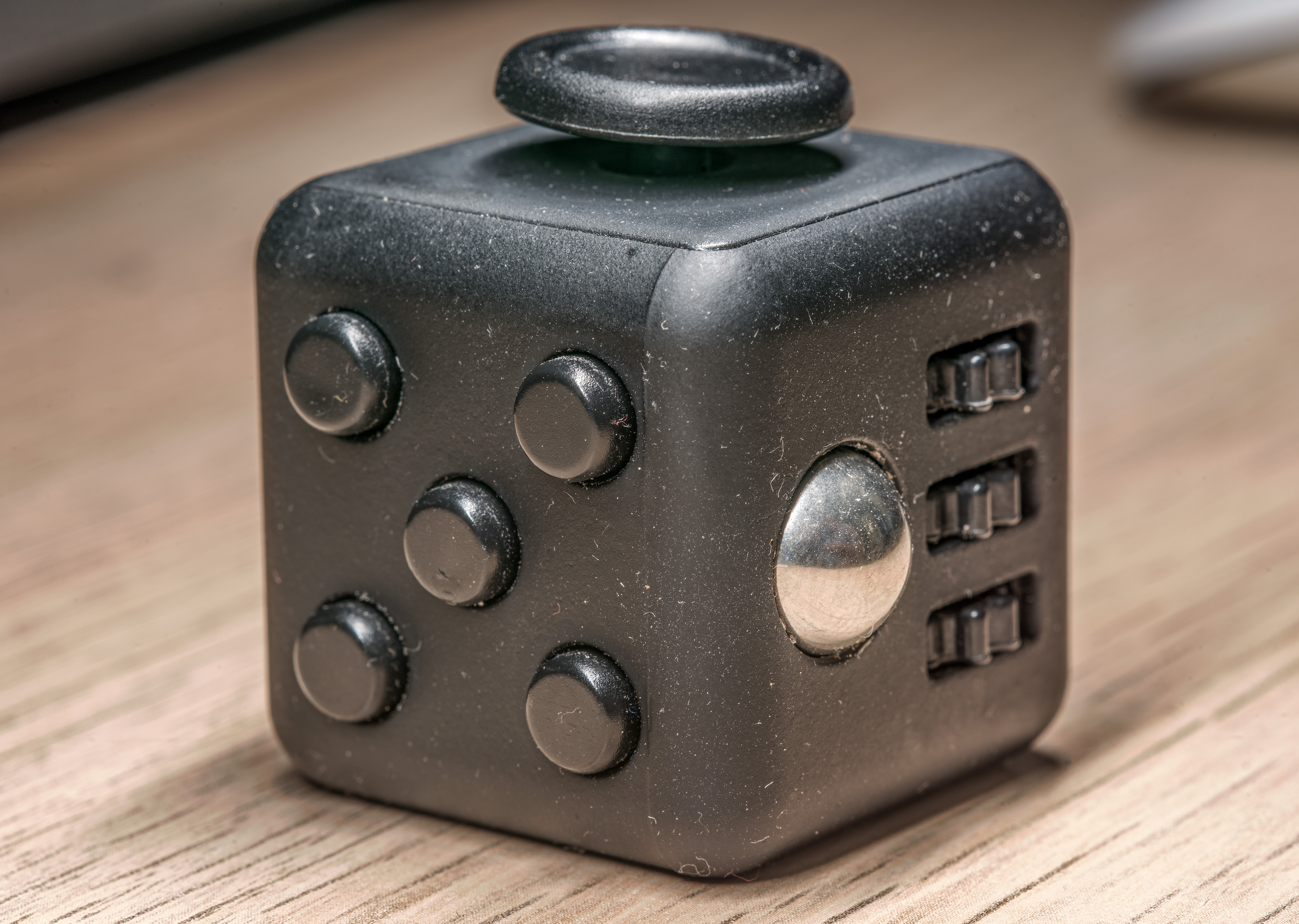
A fidget cube

The Fidget Cube is a fidget toy designed by Matthew and Mark McLachlan, brothers and co-founders of the US design studio Antsy Labs. It has fidget tools on all sides: a toggle switch, gears, a rolling ball (marble), a joystick, a spinning disk, a worry stone, and five buttons.

== Reception ==
In a positive review, The Verge described the cube as, "basically a baby toy for adults".

After its 2016 Kickstarter campaign, the Fidget Cube ranked tenth on the highest-funded crowdfunding projects.

== See also ==
- Fidgeting
- Fidget spinner
- Stress ball
- Worry beads
- Infinity Cube
