= Infinity cube =

Foldable cube made of die

An infinity cube made of dice being played with

An animation showing different moves and states of the infinity cube (click to animate)

An infinity cube is a kind of mechanical puzzle toy with mathematical principles. Its shape is similar to a 2×2×2 Rubik's Cube, but with a different mechanism. It can be opened and put back together from different directions, thus creating a visually interesting effect.

All six configurations of the infinity cube, with the hinges coloured. The configurations can be reached in sequence, with the glow denoting the next hinges to be employed in each step.

== Mathematics ==
The infinity cube has far fewer permutations than the Rubik's Cube.

The Rubik's Cube group has $43{,}252{,}003{,}274{,}489{,}856{,}000\,\! = \frac{12!}{2} \cdot 2^{12-1} \cdot 8! \cdot 3^{8 - 1}$ permutations and is isomorphic to the following group, where $A_n$ are alternating groups and $\mathbb Z_n$ are cyclic groups:

$$(\mathbb Z_3^7 \times \mathbb Z_2^{11}) \rtimes \,((A_8 \times A_{12}) \rtimes \mathbb Z_2).$$

The infinity cube only has 6 configurations.

== See also ==
- Yoshimoto Cube
- Paper model
- Fidget Cube
- 15 puzzle
