= Fidget spinner =

Stress-relieving toy

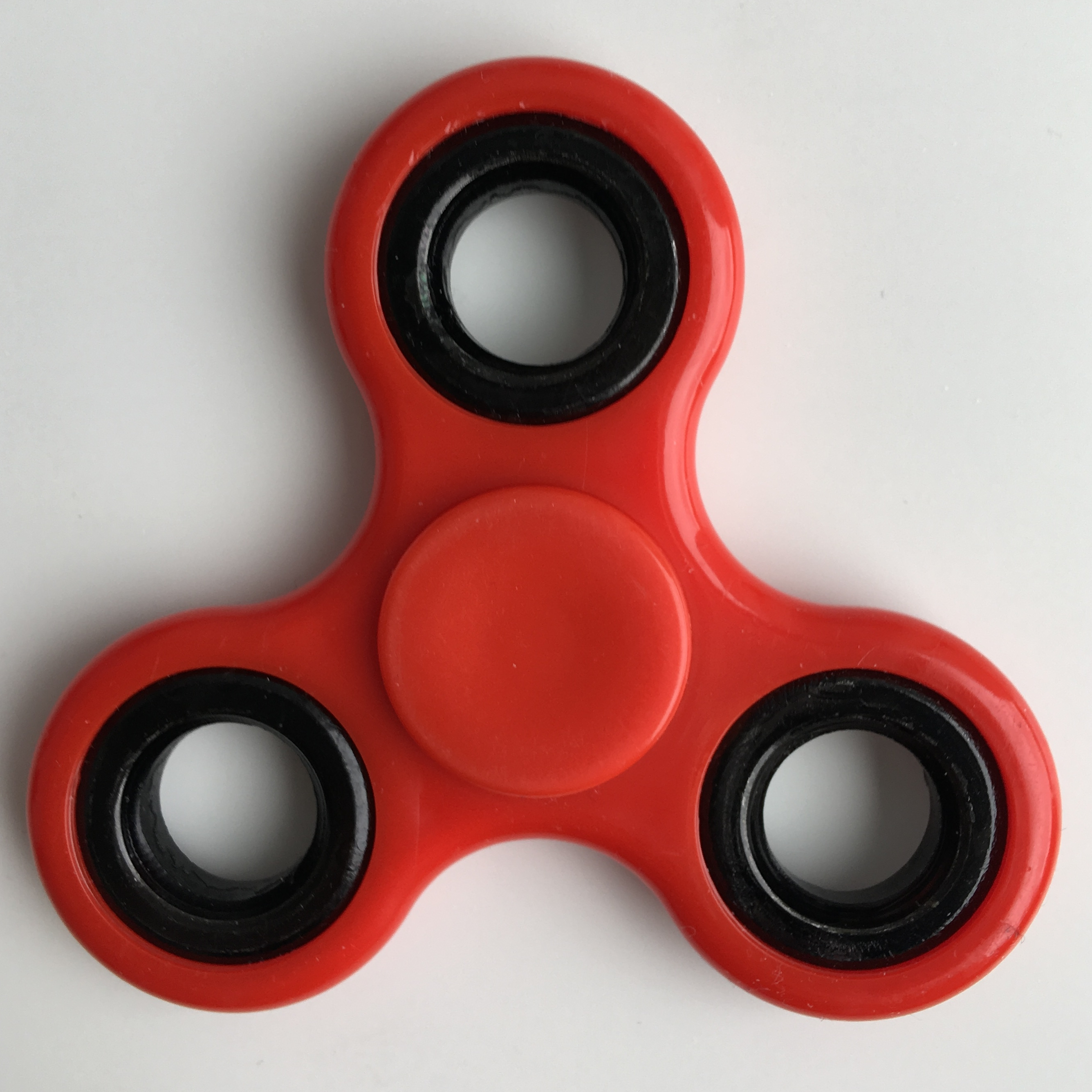
- A typical three-lobed fidget spinner
- Type: Stress-relieving toy, fidget toy
- Invented by: Scott McCoskery
- Country: United States
- Availability: 2014–present
- Materials: Brass, stainless steel, titanium, copper, plastic, etc.

A fidget spinner or hand spinner is a fidget toy composed of a central ball bearing and two or more weighted lobes that rotate around the central axis when spun. Typically made of plastic or metal, the toy operates on basic mechanical principles such as angular momentum and low-friction motion, allowing it to spin smoothly and for extended periods. The toy rose to widespread popularity in 2017, and was marketed as a variety of uses, including stress relief and support for individuals with attention-related conditions. Although some proponents claimed therapeutic benefits for conditions such as attention deficit hyperactivity disorder (ADHD) and autism, empirical studies have not substantiated these claims. Reception was mixed, with reports of both positive user experiences and criticism regarding classroom disruptions and safety concerns.

== Structure and physics ==
A fidget spinner being spun

Fidget spinners are typically made of rubber or metal, with a central ball bearing and several prongs extending outward. The ball bearing consists of small metal balls that roll between an inner and outer race, allowing the spinner to rotate smoothly around its axis. When a prong is flicked, the spinner rotates around the bearing with minimal resistance due to the rolling motion of the balls inside the bearing.

The design also distributes mass away from the center, increasing the moment of inertia, which helps maintain rotational motion. As the spinner rotates, it behaves like a gyroscope, resisting changes to its orientation due to angular momentum. Over time, the speed of rotation decreases following an exponential decay pattern, meaning that while it slows gradually, it cannot spin indefinitely.

== History ==
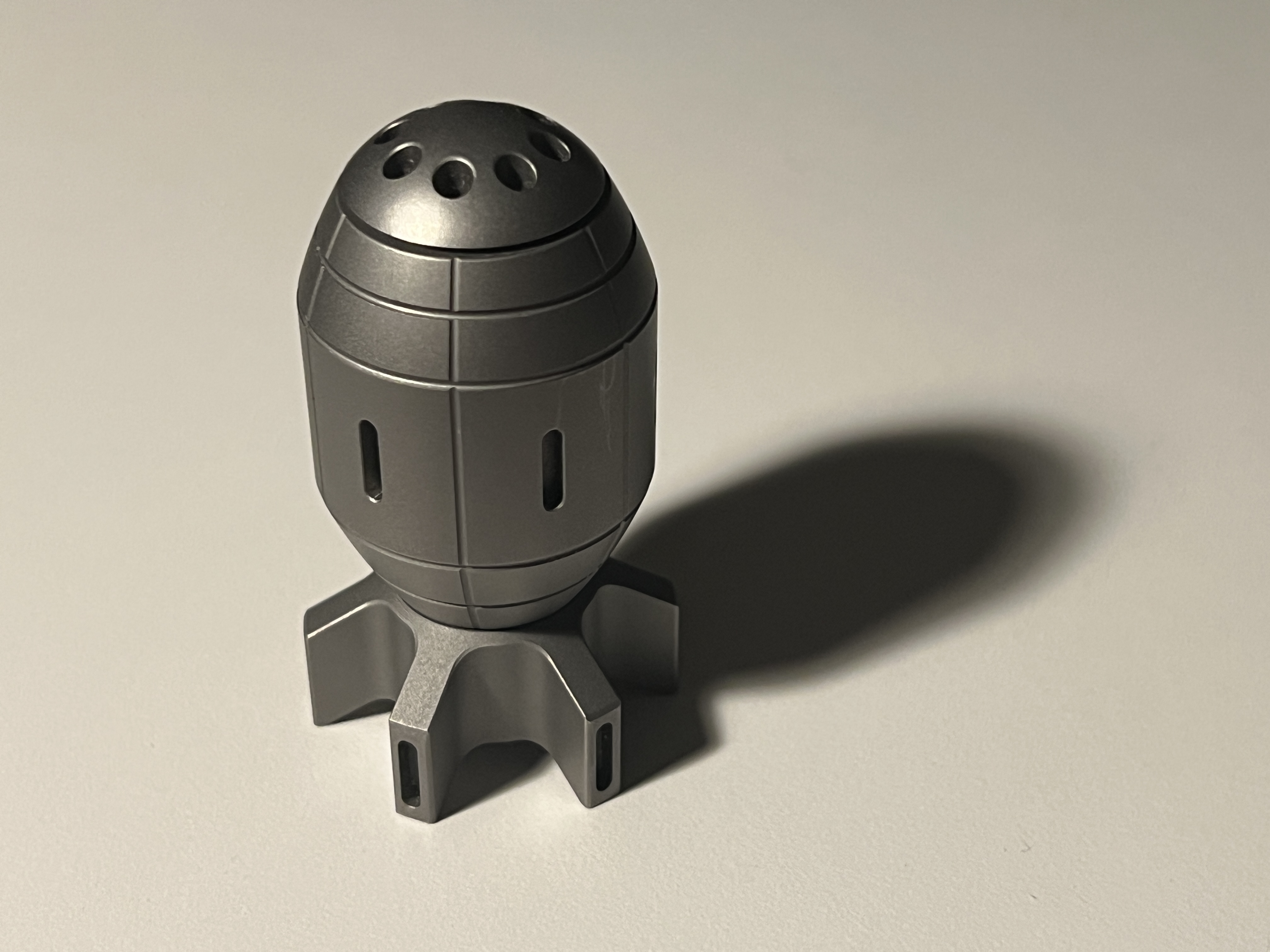
Spinner "Bomblet"

On May 11, 2016, Michael Scott McCoskery filed a provisional patent application for a toy incorporating a centrally mounted ball bearing and specific design features. The application included illustrations of two- and three-lobed variants. A final application was submitted in May 2017, and a U.S. utility patent was issued in March 2018. Separately, on November 29, 2016, David Allen Pavelsky of Killeen, Texas, filed for a design patent on a three-lobed spinner with a central ball bearing. Unlike McCoskery's application, Pavelsky's focused on the visual design rather than functional aspects. He was granted a U.S. design patent in October 2017. By May 2017, no patent had yet been granted for what was popularly known as the fidget spinner, despite increased consumer interest.

Media reports from outlets including The Guardian and The New York Times incorrectly identified Catherine Hettinger, a chemical engineer, as the inventor; Hettinger had actually filed a patent application in May 1993 for a "spinning toy" resembling a "finger frisbee" or "finger hat." The patent was issued in January 1997, but it lapsed in 2005 due to a lack of commercial interest. A May 2017 Bloomberg News article stated that Hettinger’s design did not include the central bearing characteristic of modern fidget spinners.

In a May 4, 2017, NPR interview, Scott McCoskery described developing a metal spinning device called the "Torqbar" around 2014 to manage his fidgeting during meetings and conference calls while working in the information technology sector in the Seattle, Washington, area. He stated that he believed it was the first version of what became known as the modern fidget spinner. At the request of an online community, he began selling the device online.

== Reception and popularity ==
Google Search popularity of fidget spinners in early-to-mid 2017

Fidget spinners gained immense popularity in 2017. Initially developed as tools for individuals with ADHD, autism, and anxiety, they were later produced and marketed to a broader consumer base. Most manufacturing occurred in China, and retailers such as Amazon, 7-Eleven, and Toys "R" Us reported high sales volume, with the product ranking among the top-selling toys and games. The devices were used by a range of age groups, with 23% of sales coming from millennials.

The toys also became a subject of internet humor. In 2017, comedian Tim Savage, in character as Skweezy Jibbs, went viral with a hoax claiming he had named a newborn son "Fidgit Spinner".

Public response varied. Some users reported temporary stress relief or distraction from routine activities, but the widespread use of the devices caused disruptions in schools. Educators in the United States, United Kingdom, and Australia reported that fidget spinners were frequently misused and interfered with classroom management, leading to formal bans in various school districts. In some cases, limited use was allowed under specific conditions, though educators expressed concern about the device's impact on attention and classroom behavior.

Scientific evaluations did not confirm effectiveness in improving focus. Research indicated that fidget spinner use was associated with reduced memory performance, increased attention lapses, and decreased focus during academic tasks. These effects were observed in both new and existing users who had positive expectations of the product. Some studies found that general physical activity might benefit children with ADHD, but researchers concluded that fidget spinners involved limited movement and functioned more as distractions than supportive tools. Children using the devices in classroom studies generally showed lower attention levels than peers who did not use them.

Safety issues were reported. Incidents included ingestion of small components, such as in the case of a 10-year-old girl requiring surgery. The U.S. Consumer Product Safety Commission and European safety authorities issued warnings about choking hazards and the dangers of button batteries, which can cause internal injuries if swallowed. Another case involved a battery-powered spinner catching fire during charging. Regulatory bodies advised adult supervision and recommended the toys not be used by children under three years old.

== See also ==
- Fidget Cube
- Office toy
- Pet Rock
- Pop it, a 2021 fidget toy
- Stress ball
- Top
- Worry stone
