= Music of Greece =

The music of Greece is as diverse and celebrated as its history. Greek music separates into two parts: Greek traditional music and Byzantine music. These compositions have existed for millennia, having originated in the Byzantine period and Greek antiquity. There is a continuous development which appears in the language, rhythm, structure, and melody. Music is a significant aspect of Hellenic culture, both within Greece and in the diaspora.

"Φεύγω κόρη"
Example of a Greek song recorded in Constantinople (Istanbul) in 1912

== Greek musical history ==
Greek musical history extends far back into ancient Greece, since music was a major part of ancient Greek theater. Later influences from the Roman Empire, Eastern Europe and the Byzantine Empire changed the form and style of Greek music. In the 19th century, opera composers, like Nikolaos Mantzaros (1795–1872), Spyridon Xyndas (1812–1896) and Spyridon Samaras (1861–1917) and symphonists, like Dimitris Lialios and Dionysios Rodotheatos revitalized Greek art music.

=== Ancient Greece ===
In ancient Greece, men usually performed choruses for entertainment, celebration, and spiritual reasons. Instruments included the double-reed aulos and the plucked string instrument (like pandura), the kanonaki, the lyre, especially the special kind called a kithara.

Music was an important part of education in ancient Greece, and boys were taught music starting at age six. Greek musical literacy created a flowering of development; Greek music theory included the Greek musical modes, which eventually became the basis for Eastern and Western religious music and classical music.

=== Roman era ===
Due to Rome's reverence for Greek culture, the Romans borrowed the Greek method of 'enchiriadic notation' (marks which indicated the general shape of the tune but not the exact notes or rhythms) to record their music, if they used any notation at all.

=== Byzantine era ===
The tradition of eastern liturgical chant, encompassing the Greek-speaking world, developed in the Byzantine Empire from the establishment of its capital, Constantinople, in 330 until its fall in 1453. It is undeniably of composite origin, drawing on the artistic and technical productions of the classical Greek age, of Jewish religious music, and inspired by the monophonic vocal music that evolved in the early (Greek) Christian cities of Alexandria, Antioch and Ephesus (see also Early Christian music). In his lexicographical discussion of instruments, the Persian geographer Ibn Khurradadhbih (d. 911) cited the lūrā (bowed lyra) as a typical instrument of the Byzantines along with the urghun (organ), shilyani (probably a type of harp or lyre), and the salandj (probably a bagpipe). Other instruments used in the folk Byzantine-era music, were kanonaki, oud, laouto, santouri and other instruments that are still played in post-Byzantine regions today.

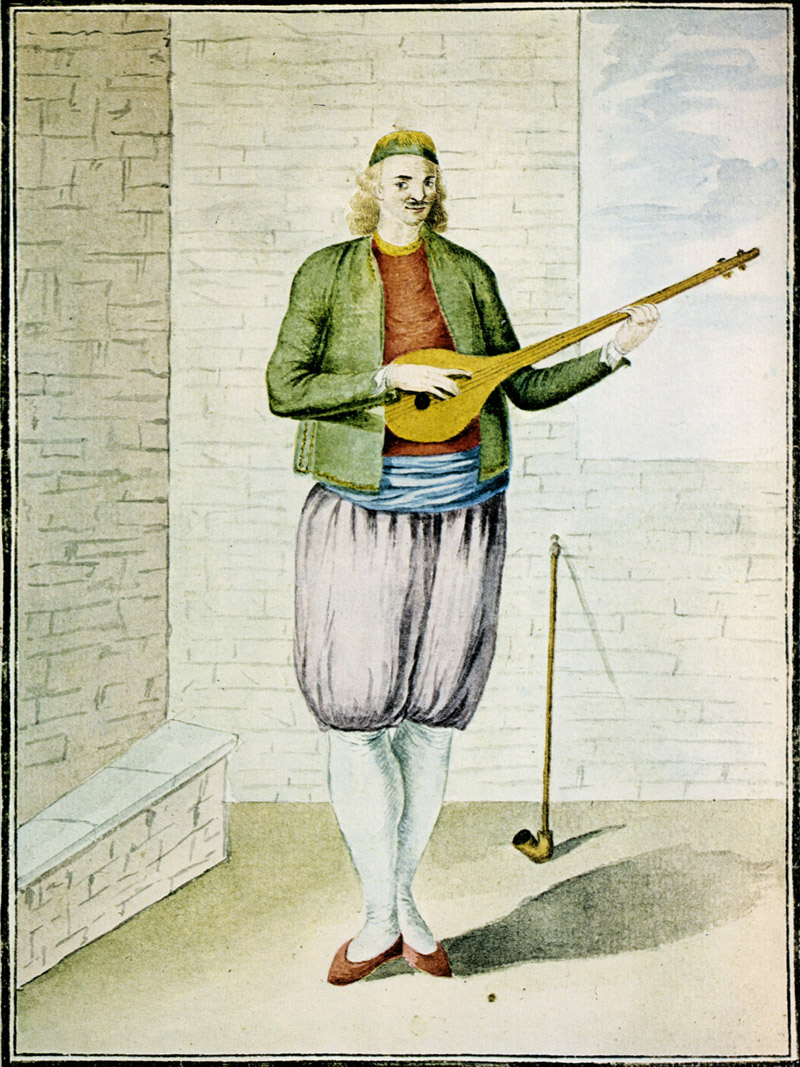
Greek playing tambouras, 18th-century painting

=== Ottoman era ===
The Greeks were familiar, in this period that stretched from the 15th century to the time of Greek war of independence, with the traditional Greek folk music, elements of the Ottoman music, such as with surviving Byzantine music and more specifically, hymns: Church music. These genres have certainly reached a high degree of evolution. They were forms of monophonic music that had many elements of ancient Greek origin, but also, they had nothing to do with Western polyphonic music.

By the beginning of the 20th century, live music cafés were popular in cities such as Constantinople and Smyrna, where small groups of musicians from Greece played. The bands were typically led by a female vocalist and included a violin. The improvised songs typically exclaimed amán amán, which led to the name amanédes (αμανέδες amanédes; singular αμανές amanés) or café-aman (καφέ-αμάν) – as opposed to the more Westernized café-chantants (καφέ-σαντάν). Greek musicians of this period included Marika Papagika, Rosa Eskenazi and Rita Abatzi. This period also brought in the rebetiko movement, which had local Smyrniote, Ottoman and Byzantine influences.

=== Folk music (dimotiká or demotic) ===
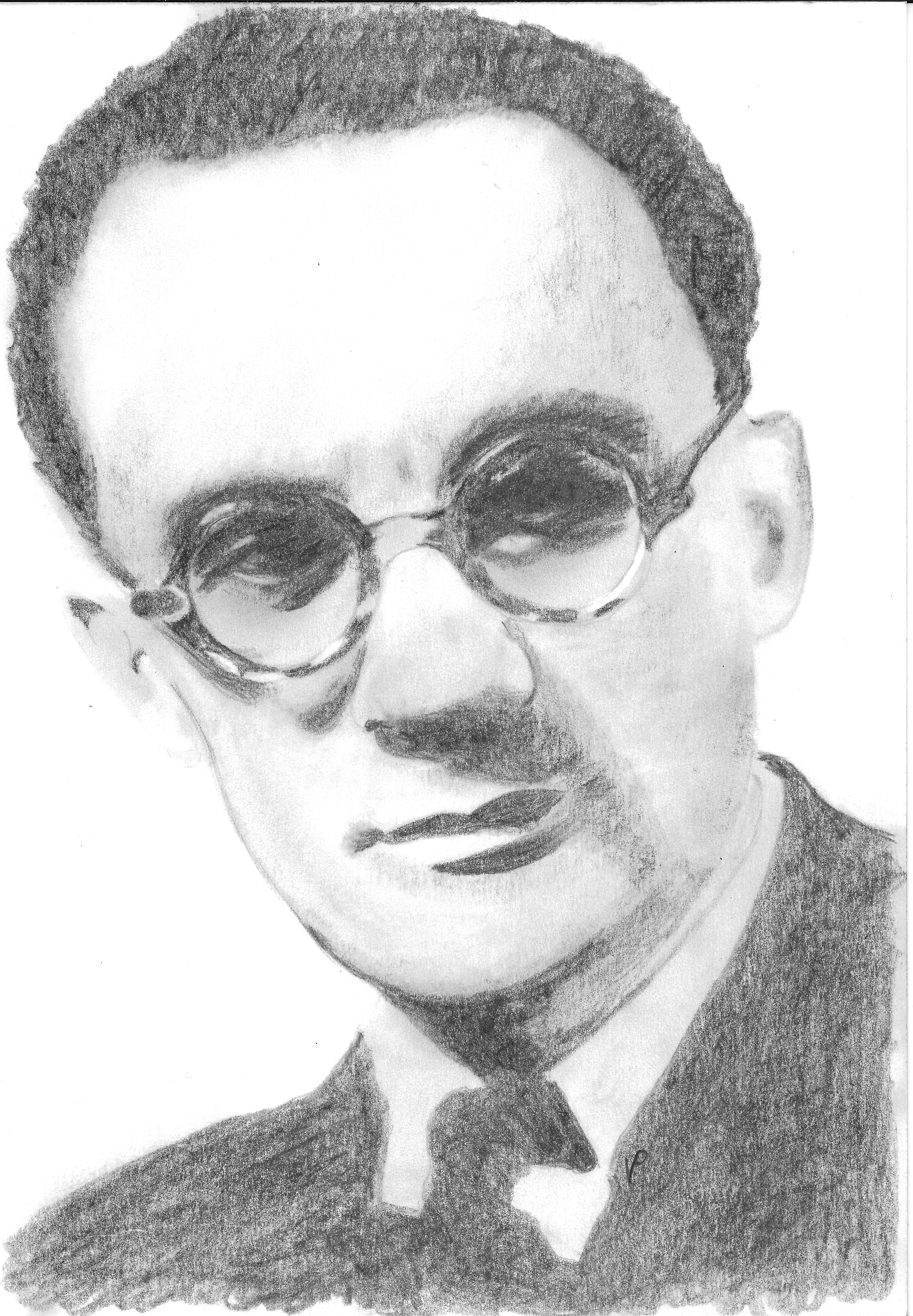
Nikos Skalkottas (1904–1949) drew his influences from both the classical repertoire and the Greek folk tradition.

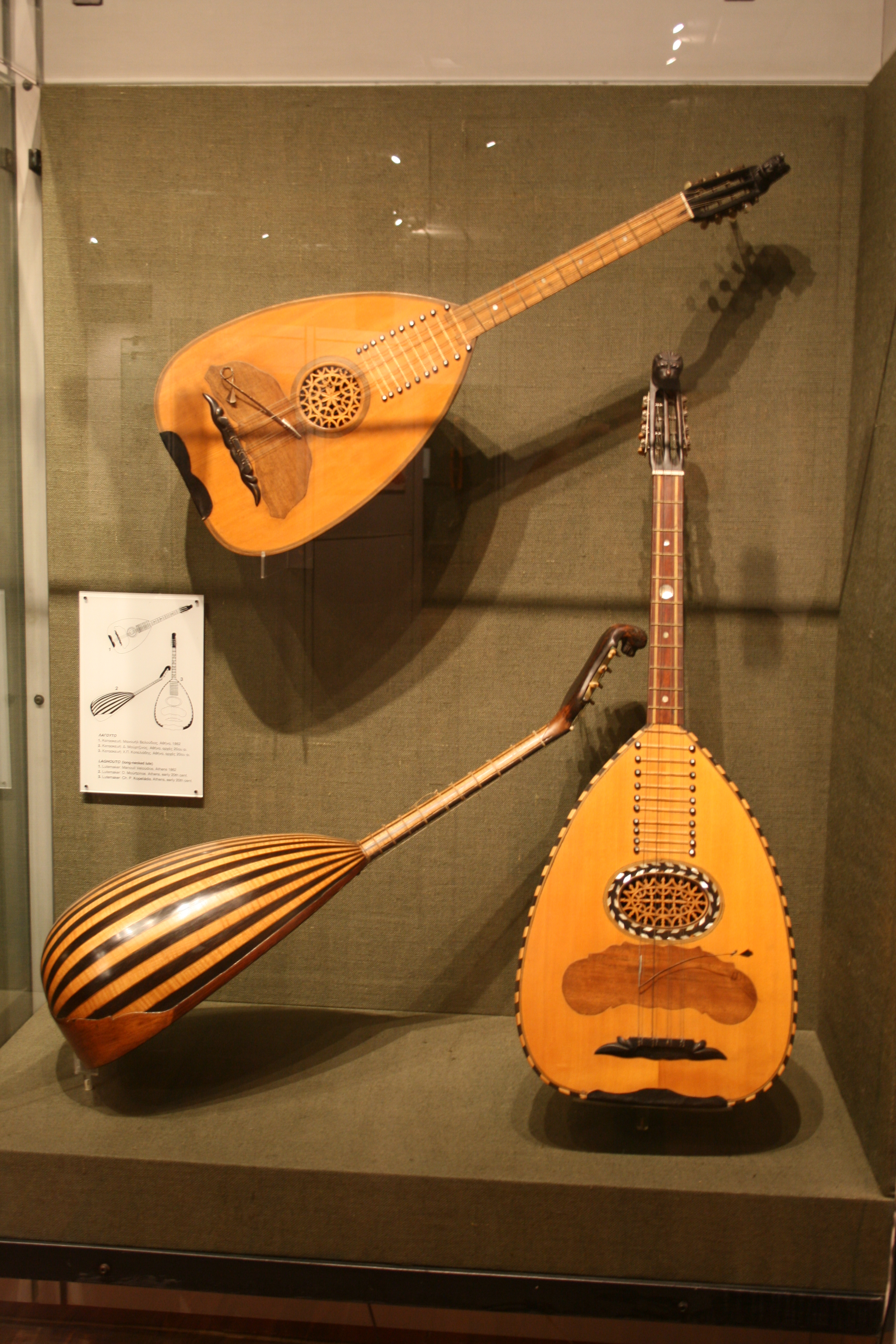
Different types of laouto

Greek folk music traditions are said to derive from the music played by ancient Greeks. There are said to be two musical movements in Greek folk music (παραδοσιακή μουσική): acritic songs and klephtic songs. Akritic music comes from the 9th century akrites, or border guards of the Byzantine Empire. Following the end of the Byzantine period, klephtic music arose before the Greek Revolution, developed among the kleftes, warriors who fought against the Ottoman Empire. Klephtic music is monophonic and uses no harmonic accompaniment.

Dimotika tragoudia are only from the mainland and accompanied by clarinets, tambourines, laouto, violins and lyras, and include dance music like syrtó, kalamatianó, tsámiko and hasaposérviko, as well as vocal music like kléftiko. The lyrics are based on dimotiki (folk) poetry (usually by an anonymous lyricist) and popular themes are love, marriage, humor, death, nature, water, sea, religious, about klephts, armatoloi, various war fighters or battles, etc. Some notable instrumentalists include clarinet virtuosos like Petroloukas Chalkias, Giorgos Gevgelis and Yiannis Vassilopoulos, as well as laouto and fiddle players like Nikos Saragoudas, Vasilis Kostas and Giorgos Koros.

Greek folk music is found all throughout Greece, Cyprus, and several regions of Turkey, as well as among communities in countries like the United States, Canada and Australia. The island of Cyprus and several regions of Turkey are home to long-standing communities of Greeks in Turkey with their own unique styles of music.

==== Nisiótika ====
Nisiotika is a general term denoting folk songs from the Greek islands, especially the Aegean Islands. Among the most popular types of them is Ikariótiko tragoúdi, "song from Ikaria".

===== Ikariótikos =====
Ikariótikos is a traditional type of dance, and also the name of its accompanying type of singing, originating in the Aegean island of Ikaria. At first, it was a very slow dance, but today Ikariotikos is a very quick dance. Some specialists say that the traditional Ikariotikos was slow and the quick "version" of it is in fact Ballos. Music and dancing are major forms of entertainment in Ikaria. Throughout the year, Ikarians host baptisms, weddings, parties and religious festivals where one can listen and dance to live traditional Ikarian Music.

===== Modern nisiótika =====
Singer Mariza Koch was largely responsible for the revival of interest in Nisiótika in the 1970s and 1980s. During the 1990s and 2000s, singers such as Yiannis Parios and Stella Konitopoulou helped this music gain occasional mainstream popularity.

==== Cretan music ====
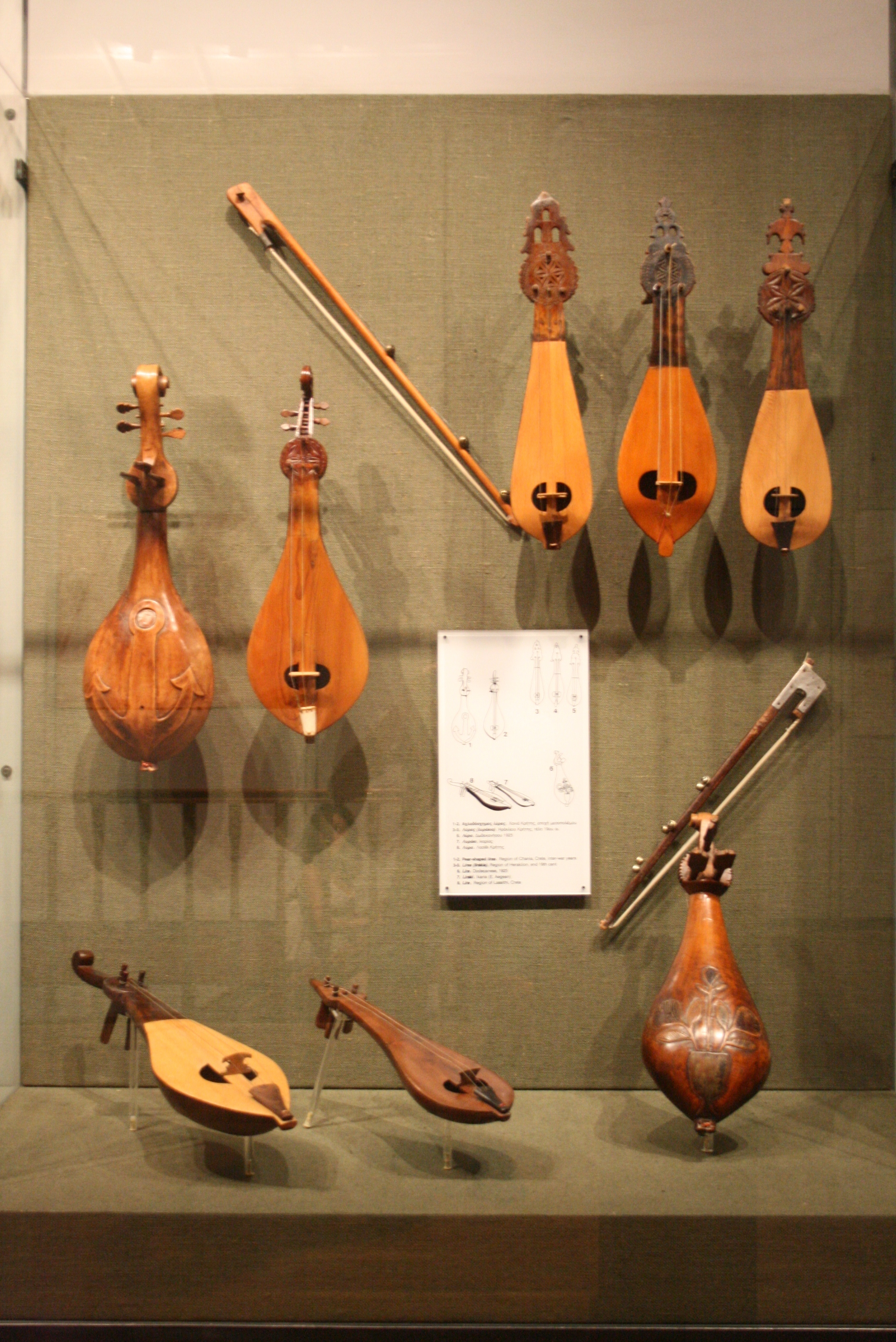
Cretan lyras

The Cretan lyra is the dominant folk instrument on the island; it is a three-stringed bowed instrument similar to the Byzantine Lyra. It is often accompanied by laouto (which is similar to both an oud and a lute), guitar, violin and (Cretan) mandolin. Nikos Xylouris, Psarantonis (Antonis Xylouris), Thanassis Skordalos, Kostas Moundakis, Ross Daly, Nikos Zoidakis and Vasilis Skoulas are among the most renowned players of the lýra. The violin is also used in Cretan music. The most renowned player of the violin is Antonis Martsakis who is also a dancer. Mandolin is also used in Cretan music. Loudovikos ton Anogeion (Λουδοβίκος των Ανωγείων) is a well-known mandolin player from Crete. The bass in that music is coming from the laouto. Giannis Haroulis and Michalis Tzouganakis are notable artists of the instrument.

===== Cretan music in media =====
The Cretan music theme "Zorba's Dance" by Mikis Theodorakis (incorporating elements from the hasapiko dance), which appears in the 1964 Hollywood movie Zorba the Greek remains the best-known Greek song abroad.

==== Other folk traditions ====
Other major regional musical traditions of Greece include:

- Music of the Heptanese
- Music of Epirus
- Music of Macedonia
- Music of Thrace

==== Notable artists ====
Composers:

- Ross Daly
- Giorgos Konitopoulos
- Dimitris Lagios
- Alkinoos Ioannidis
- Kostas Mountakis
- Psarantonis
- Dionysis Savvopoulos

Singers:

- Chronis Aidonidis
- Yiannis Parios
- Xanthippi Karathanasi
- Mariza Koch
- Domna Samiou
- Michalis Violaris
- Nikos Xylouris

== Classical music ==
=== Ionian school ===
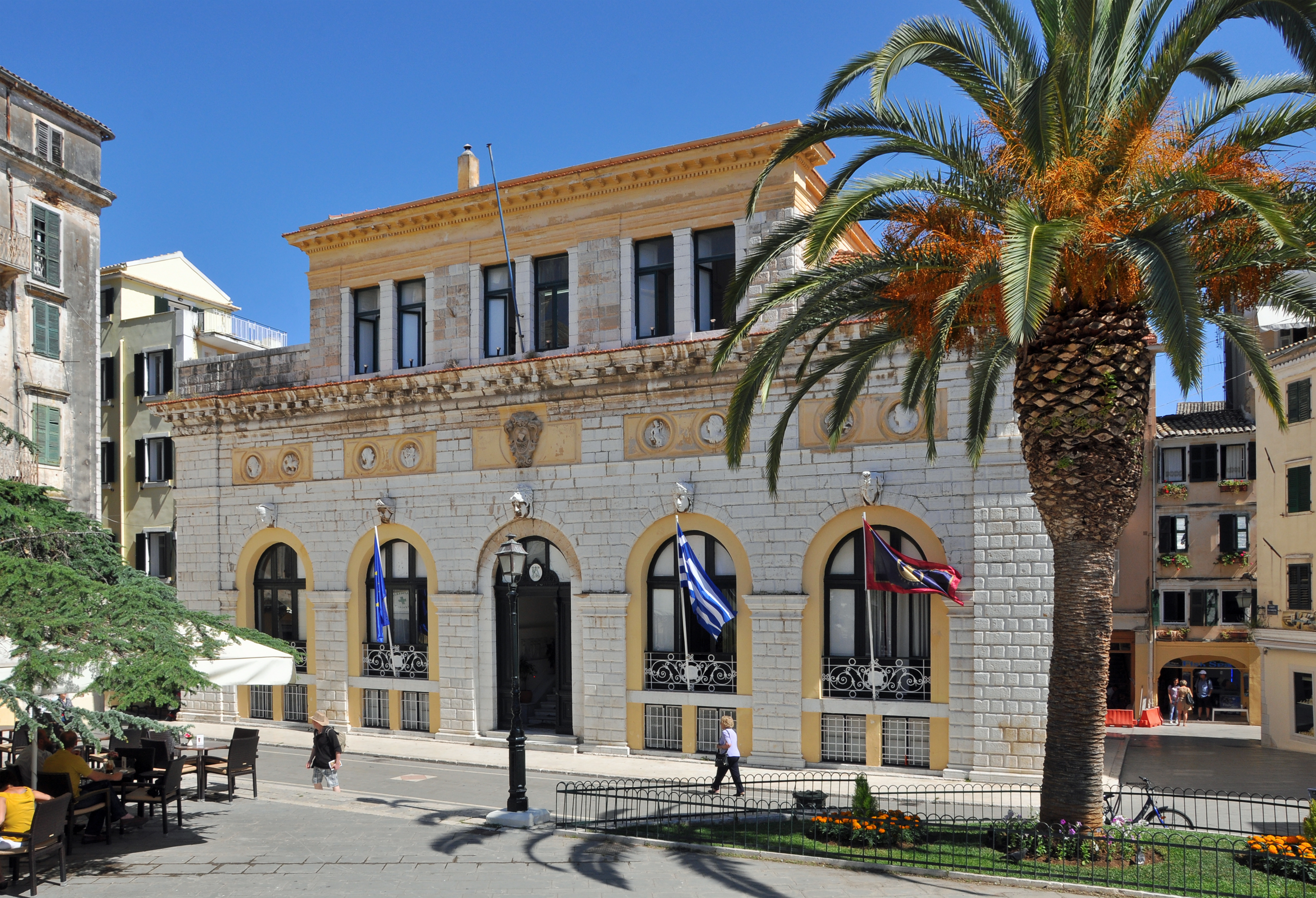
Nobile Teatro di San Giacomo di Corfù, the first theatre and opera house of modern Greece and the place where the first Greek opera, Spyridon Xyndas' "The Parliamentary Candidate" based on an exclusively Greek libretto was performed.

It was through the Ionian islands (which were under Venetian rule and influence) that all the major developments of the Western European classical music were introduced to mainland Greeks. The region is notable for the birth of the first school of modern Greek classical music (Heptanesian or Ionian school; Greek: Επτανησιακή Σχολή), established in 1815. Prominent representatives of this genre include Nikolaos Mantzaros, Spyridon Xyndas, Spyridon Samaras, Dionysius Rodotheatos and Pavlos Carrer.

The Church music (Byzantine) of the islands is also different from the rest of Greece, with significant western and Catholic influences on the Orthodox rite.

=== Greek national school ===
Manolis Kalomiris (1883–1962) was the founder of the Greek national school of music. Born in Smyrna, he attended school in Constantinople and studied piano and composition in Vienna. His work drew influences also from the Greek folk music, poetry (he was an admirer of Kostis Palamas) and myth, aiming to combine the German Romanticism with Greek motives. In 1919, he founded the Hellenic Conservatory and in 1926 the National Conservatoire. Representatives are also Nikos Skalkottas, who drew his influences also from Greek folk tradition, Emilios Riadis and the conductor Dimitris Mitropoulos.

== Popular music ==
=== Greek operetta and early popular songs ===
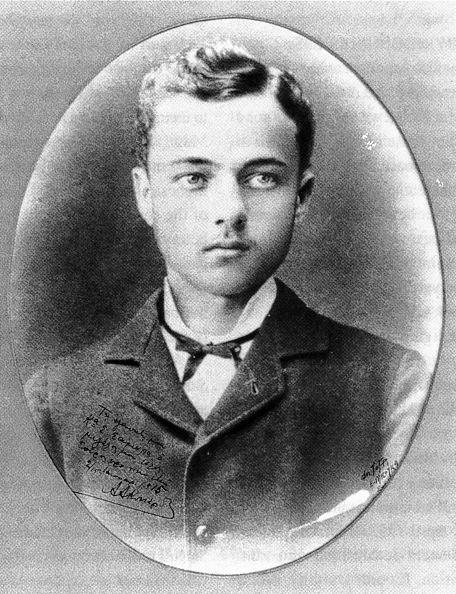
Spyridon Samaras (1861–1917)

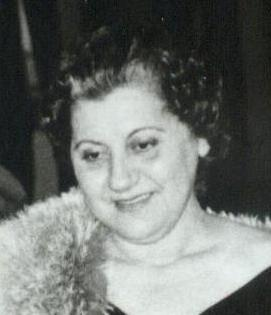
Sofia Vembo

The Heptanesean kantádes (καντάδες 'serenades'; sing.: καντάδα) are based on the popular Italian music of the early 19th century and became the forerunners of the Greek modern song, influencing its development to a considerable degree. For the first part of the next century, several Greek composers continued to borrow elements from the Heptanesean style.

The most successful songs during the period 1870–1930 were the so-called Athenian serenades (Αθηναϊκές καντάδες), and the songs performed on stage (επιθεωρησιακά τραγούδια 'theatrical revue songs') in revues, musical comedies, operettas and nocturnes that were dominating Athens' theatre scene. Notable composers of operettas or nocturnes were Spyridon Samaras, Kostas Giannidis, Spyridon Kaisaris, Dionysios Lavrangas, Nikos Hatziapostolou, while Theophrastos Sakellaridis' The Godson remains probably the most popular operetta. Despite the fact that the Athenian songs were not autonomous artistic creations (in contrast with the serenades) and despite their original connection with mainly dramatic forms of Art, they eventually became hits as independent songs. Notable actors of Greek operettas, who also made a series of melodies and songs popular at that time, include Orestis Makris, Kalouta sisters, Petros Epitropakis, Vasilis Avlonitis, Afroditi Laoutari, Rena Vlahopoulou, Eleni Papadaki, Aris Maliagros, Marika Nezer, Marika Krevata and others. Italian opera also had a great influence on the musical aesthetics of the modern Greeks. Some popular operettas include:

Ta Niata
"Ta Niata (The Youth)", composed by Miliaris/Attik, 1918

- Kritikopoula (Spyridon Samaras, 1916)
- The Godson (Theophrastos Sakellaridis, 1918)
- I want to see the Pope (Theophrastos Sakellaridis, 1920)
- Oi Apachides ton Athinon (Nikos Hatziapostolou, 1921)
- Beba (Theophrastos Sakellaridis, 1928)

After 1930, wavering among American and European musical influences as well as the Greek musical tradition, Greek composers begin to write music using the tunes of the tango, samba, waltz, swing, bolero, foxtrot, some times combined with melodies in the style of Athenian serenades' repertory. Nikos Gounaris was probably the most renowned composer and singer of the time (often called "Mr. Greece"). Giorgos Mouzakis was a prominent virtuoso trumpeter (borrowed latin jazz elements), while Attik and Michalis Souyioul were also among the most successful and popular composers. Notable singers of this style include also Fotis Polymeris, Sofia Vembo (a star of the era), Mary Lo, Danaë Stratigopoulou, Stella Greca and Tony Maroudas.

==== Notable artists ====
Composers:

- Attik (Kleon Triantafyllou)
- Kostas Giannidis
- Kostas Kapnisis
- Giorgos Mouzakis
- Theophrastos Sakellaridis
- Michalis Souyioul (Souyioultzoglou)
- Giorgos Giannakopoulos (lyricist)
- Giorgos Oikonomidis (lyricist)
- Alekos Sakellarios (lyricist)
- Mimis Traiforos (lyricist)

Singers:

- Ioannis Filandros/Spyros Koronis duo
- Nikos Gounaris
- Tony Maroudas
- Kakia Mendri
- Fotis Polymeris
- Luisa Poselli
- Danaë
- Sofia Vembo

=== Rebetiko ===
Minore from Smyrna
"Smyrna Minore", traditional, sung by Marika Papagika, 1918

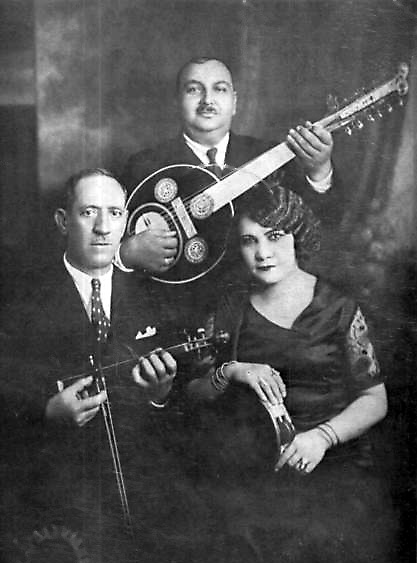
Smyrna-style rebetiko trio: Dimitrios Semsis, Agapios Tomboulis, Roza Eskenazi (Athens 1932)

Rebetiko was initially associated with the lower and poor classes, but later reached greater general acceptance as the rough edges of its overt subcultural character were softened and polished. Rebetiko probably originated in the music of the larger Greek cities, most of them coastal, in today's Greece and Asia Minor. Emerged by the 1920s as the urban folk music of Greek society's outcasts (manges). The earliest Greek rebetiko singers (refugees, drug-users, criminals, and itinerants) were scorned by mainstream society. They sang heartrending tales of drug abuse, prison, and violence, usually accompanied by the bouzouki.

In 1923, after the population exchange between Greece and Turkey, many ethnic Greeks from Asia Minor fled to Greece as a result of the Greco-Turkish War. They settled in poor neighborhoods in Piraeus, Thessaloniki, and Athens. Many of these immigrants were highly educated, such as songwriter Vangelis Papazoglou, and Panagiotis Toundas, composer and leader of Odeon Records' Greek subsidiary, who are traditionally considered the founders of the Smyrna school of rebetiko. Another tradition from Smyrna that came along with the Greek refugees was the tekés (τεκές) 'opium den', or hashish dens. Groups of men would sit in a circle, smoke hashish from a hookah, and improvise music of various kinds.

With the coming of the Metaxas dictatorship, rebetiko was suppressed due to the uncompromising lyrics. Hashish dens, baglamas and bouzouki were banned, or at least playing in the eastern-style manner and scales.

Some of the earliest legends of Greek music, such as the quartet of Anestis Delias, Markos Vamvakaris, Stratos Pagioumtzis and Yiorgos Batis came out of this music scene. Vamvakaris became perhaps the first renowned rebetiko musician after the beginning of his solo career. Other popular rebetiko songwriters and singers of this period (1940s) include: Dimitris Gogos (better known as Bayandéras), Stelios Perpiniadis, Spyros Peristeris, Giannis Papaioannou, and Apostolos Hatzichristos.

The scene was soon popularized further by stars like Vassilis Tsitsanis. His song Συννεφιασμένη Κυριακή - Synnefiasméni Kyriakí became an anthem for the oppressed Greeks when it was composed in 1943 (during the Axis occupation of Greece during World War II), despite the fact that it was not recorded until 1948. He was followed by female singers like Marika Ninou, Ioanna Georgakopoulou, and Sotiria Bellou. In 1953, Manolis Chiotis added a fourth pair of strings to the bouzouki, which allowed it to be played as a guitar and set the stage for the future 'electrification' of rebetiko. This final era of rebetiko (mid-1940s–1953) also featured the emergence of nightclubs (κέντρα διασκεδάσεως) as a means of popularizing music. By the late 1950s, rebetiko had declined; it only survived in the form of archontorebetiko (αρχοντορεμπέτικο "posh rebetiko"), a refined style of rebetiko that was far more accepted by the upper class than the traditional form of the genre. The mainstream popularity of archontorebetiko paved the way for éntekhno and laïkó. In the 1960s, Manolis Chiotis popularized the eight-string bouzouki and set the stage for the future 'electrification' of rebetiko.

Rebetiko in its original form was revived during the Junta of 1967–1974, when the Regime of the Colonels banned it. After the end of the Junta, many revival groups (and solo artists) appeared. The most notable of them include Opisthodromiki Kompania, Rembetiki Kompania, Babis Tsertos, Agathonas Iakovidis and others.

=== Éntekhno ===
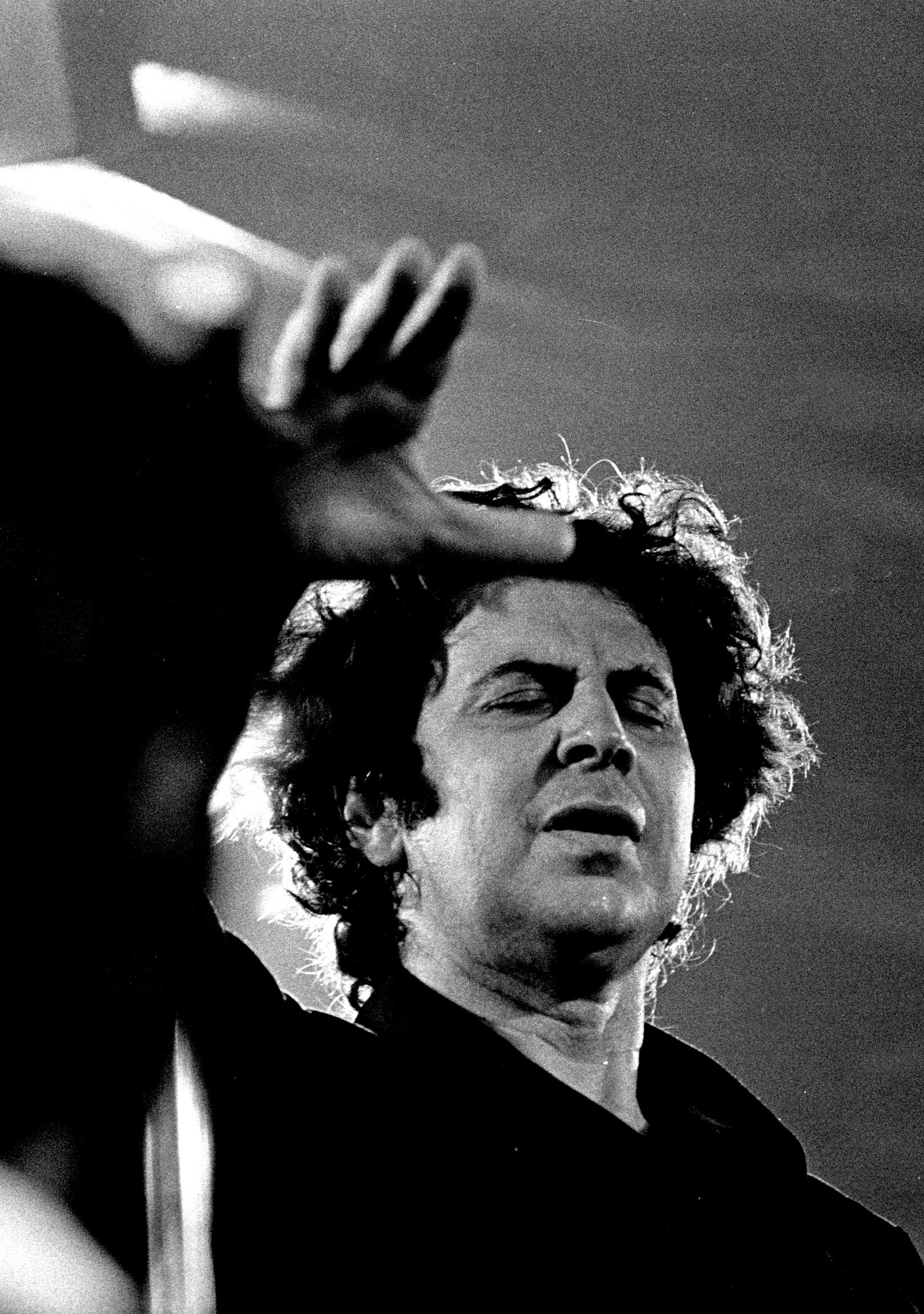
Mikis Theodorakis

Drawing on rebetiko's internationalization by Tsitsanis and Chiotis, éntekhno (or éntechno) arose in the late 1950s. Éntekhno (art song) is orchestral music with elements from Greek folk rhythm and melody; its lyrical themes are often based on the work of famous Greek poets. As opposed to other forms of Greek urban folk music, éntekhno concerts would often take place outside a hall or a nightclub in the open air. Mikis Theodorakis and Manos Hadjidakis were the most popular early composers of éntekhno song cycles. They were both educated in classical music; the lack of a wide public for this kind of music in Greece drove them to the invention of éntekhno, in which they transferred some values of Western art music, such as ballad tunes.

Theodorakis was the first composer to use the bouzouki in this genre of music, trying to include this instrument in mainstream culture. Other significant Greek songwriters included Stavros Kouyioumtzis, Manos Loïzos, and Dimos Moutsis. Significant lyricists of this genre are Nikos Gatsos, Manos Eleftheriou and poet Tasos Livaditis. By the 1960s, innovative albums helped éntekhno become close to mainstream, and also led to its appropriation by the film industry for use in soundtracks.

A specific form of éntekhno was the so-called "political song"; songs with a political message, of the Left, which arose during the military junta and became very popular after its fall in the late '70s. Manos Loizos, guitarist Panos Tzavellas, Maria Dimitriadi and Maria Farantouri were some representatives. Thanos Mikroutsikos released an album featuring Greek partisan songs of the Greek resistance, with his own orchestration. A form of éntekhno, which is even closer to Western classical music, was introduced during the late 1970s by Mikroutsikos. (See the section 'Other popular trends' below for further information on Néo Kýma and contemporary éntekhno.)

Notable éntekhno works include:

- Six folk paintings (Manos Hatzidakis, 1951)
- Epitaphios (Mikis Theodorakis, 1960, poetry by Yiannis Ritsos)
- Epifania (Mikis Theodorakis, 1962, poetry by Giorgos Seferis)
- Dead brother's song (Mikis Theodorakis, 1962)
- Mikres Kyklades (Mikis Theodorakis, 1963, poetry by Odysseas Elytis)
- To Axion Esti (Mikis Theodorakis, 1964, poetry by Odysseas Elytis)
- Gioconda's Smile (Manos Hatzidakis, 1965)
- Romiossini (Mikis Theodorakis, 1966, poetry by Yiannis Ritsos)
- Ballos (Dionysis Savvopoulos, 1970)
- O Megalos Erotikos (Manos Hatzidakis, 1972)
- Eighteen Short Songs of the Bitter Motherland (Mikis Theodorakis, 1973, poetry by Yiannis Ritsos)
- Our Great Circus (Stavros Xarchakos for the theatrical play of Iakovos Kambanellis, 1974)
- Tetralogia (Dimos Moutsis, 1975, poetry by Constantine P. Cavafy, Kostas Karyotakis, Yiannis Ritsos and Giorgos Seferis)
- Stavros tou Notou (Southern Cross) (Thanos Mikroutsikos, 1979, poetry by Nikos Kavvadias)

==== Notable artists ====
Composers:

- Manos Hatzidakis
- Manos Loïzos
- Yannis Markopoulos
- Thanos Mikroutsikos
- Dimos Moutsis
- Mimis Plessas
- Mikis Theodorakis
- Stavros Xarchakos
- Argiris Kounadis
- Nikos Gatsos (lyricist)
- Manos Eleftheriou (lyricist)

Singers:

- Anna Vissi
- Haris Alexiou
- Grigoris Bithikotsis
- Giorgos Dalaras
- Maria Dimitriadi
- Maria Farantouri
- Antonis Kalogiannis
- Giannis Koutras
- Manolis Mitsias
- Vicky Moscholiou
- Nana Mouskouri
- Nena Venetsanou
- Dimitris Mitropanos

=== Laïkó ===
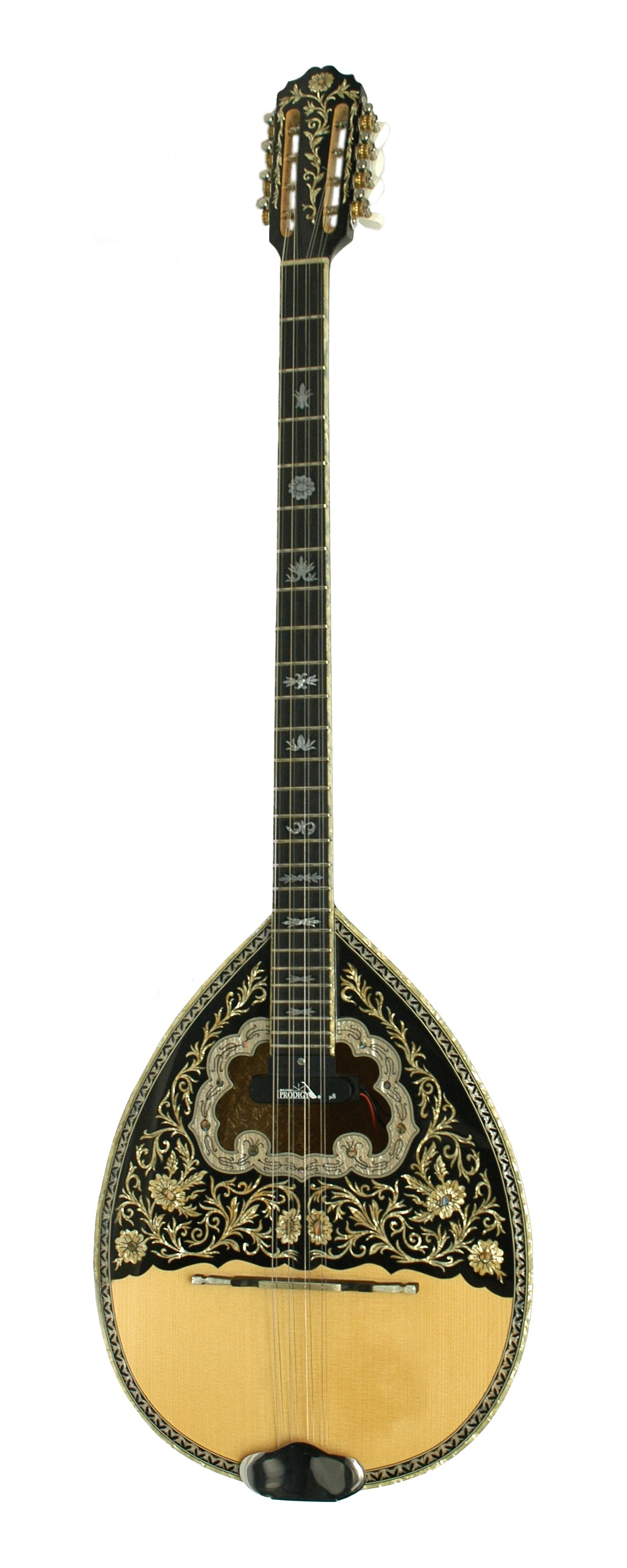
A modern four-course bouzouki

Laïkó (λαϊκό τραγούδι 'song of the people' / 'popular song' or αστική λαϊκή μουσική 'urban folk music'), is a Greek music genre that is composed in Greek language in accordance with the tradition of the Greek people. Laïkó followed after the commercialization of rebetiko music. Until the 1930s the Greek discography was dominated by two musical genres: the Greek folk music (dimotiká) and the elafró tragoudi (literally: "light song"). The latter was the Greek version of the international urban music of the era. Classic laïkó (κλασικό/παλιό λαϊκό) as it is known today, was the mainstream popular music of Greece during the 1960s and 1970s. It was dominated by singers such as Grigoris Bithikotsis, Marinella, Stelios Kazantzidis, Panos Gavalas and others. Among the most significant songwriters and lyricists of this period are Giorgos Zampetas, Manolis Hiotis and Vassilis Tsitsanis. The more cheerful version of laïkó, called elafró laïkó (ελαφρολαϊκό, elafrolaïkó 'light laïkó') and it was often used in musicals during the Golden Age of Greek cinema. Contemporary laïkó (σύγχρονο λαϊκό), also called modern laïkó, is currently Greece's mainstream music genre. Some of the strongest Greek dances and rhythms of today's Greek music culture laïká are nisiotika, syrtos, hasapika, Kalamatiana, zeibekiko, syrtaki and Greek belly dance and most of them are set to music by the Greek instrumental bouzouki. Thus, on the one hand there is the homogenized Greek popular song, with all the idioms of traditional Greek folk music, and on the other, the peculiar musical trends of the urban rebetiko (song of the cities) known also in Greece as αστικό.

Other significant songwriters and lyricists of this category are considered Akis Panou, Apostolos Kaldaras, Giorgos Mitsakis, Stavros Kouyioumtzis, Lefteris Papadopoulos and Eftychia Papagianopoulou. Many artists have combined the traditions of éntekhno and laïkó with considerable success, such as the composers Mimis Plessas and Stavros Xarchakos.

During the same era, there was also another kind of soft music (ελαφρά μουσική, also called ελαφρό, elafró 'soft (song)', literally 'light') which became fashionable; it was represented by ensembles of singers/musicians such as the Katsamba Brothers duo, the Trio Kitara, the Trio Belcanto, the Trio Atene and others. The genre's sound was an imitation of the then-contemporary Cuban and Mexican folk music, but also had elements from the early Athenian popular songs.

==== Notable artists ====
Composers:

- Manolis Chiotis
- Apostolos Kaldaras
- Stavros Kouyioumtzis
- Mimis Plessas
- Mikis Theodorakis
- Vassilis Tsitsanis
- Giorgos Zampetas
- Lefteris Papadopoulos (lyricist)
- Pythagoras Papastamatiou (lyricist)
- Eftychia Papagianopoulou (lyricist)
- Kostas Virvos (lyricist)

Singers:

- Pantelis Pantelidis
- Grigoris Bithikotsis
- Stratos Dionysiou
- Panos Gavalas
- Giannis Kalatzis
- Stelios Kazantzidis
- Mary Linda
- Marinella
- Vicky Moscholiou
- Tolis Voskopoulos
- Dimitris Mitropanos

=== Modern laïká ===
Modern laïka (μοντέρνα λαϊκά)—also contemporary laïkó/laïká (σύγχρονο λαϊκό/σύγχρονα λαϊκά) or laïko-pop (λαϊκο-πόπ)—is currently Greece's mainstream music along with some pop recordings.

Modern laïká emerged as a style in the early 1980s. An indispensable part of the contemporary laïká culture is the písta (πίστα; pl.: πίστες) "dance floor/venue". Nightclubs at which the DJs play only contemporary laïká were colloquially known in the 1990s as ellinádika. Over the years until today, the aim of the Greek music scene is only one: quality. Virtuoso musicians and expressive singers take every season, with more professionalism and love for what they do to entertain the Greek audience, to lure and to make it dance with the songs and music that everyone loves. All this music effort takes place in Europe and internationally. Greek-American music includes rebetiko and Greek folk music. The Greek music culture exists as a serious aspect of Hellenic culture, both within Greece and in the diaspora.

Renowned songwriters of modern laïká include Alekos Chrysovergis, Nikos Karvelas, Phoebus, Nikos Terzis and Christos Dantis. Renowned lyricists include Giorgos Theofanous, Evi Droutsa and Natalia Germanou.

==== 2010s ====
In the 2010s, several new artists emerged. Artists, such as Kostas Martakis, Katerina Stikoudi, Demy and X Factor contestants such as Konstantinos Argyros, Eleftheria Eleftheriou and Ivi Adamou. Several artists sometimes incorporated dance-pop elements in their laïko-pop recordings.

==== Terminology ====
In effect, there is no single name for modern laïká in the Greek language, but it is often formally referred to as σύγχρονο λαϊκό (Greek: [ˈsiŋxrono laiˈko]), a term which is however also used for denoting newly composed songs in the tradition of "proper" laïkó; when ambiguity arises, σύγχρονο ('contemporary') λαϊκό or disparagingly λαϊκο-ποπ ('folk-pop', also in the sense of "westernized") is used for the former, while γνήσιο ('genuine') or even καθαρόαιμο ('pureblood') λαϊκό is used for the latter. The choice of contrasting the notions of "westernized" and "genuine" may often be based on ideological and aesthetic grounds.

==== Criticism ====
Despite its popularity, the genre of modern laïká (especially laïko-pop) has come under scrutiny for "featuring musical clichés, average singing voices and slogan-like lyrics" and for "being a hybrid, neither laïkó, nor pop".

=== Skyládiko ===
Skyládiko (Greek pronunciation: [sciˈlaðiko]; pl.: Skyládika; Greek: Σκυλάδικο, meaning "doghouse") is a derogatory term to describe some branches of laïkó music and some of the current nightclubs in Greece in which a form of popular Greek music is performed. It is performed with electric bouzouki and guitars. It is associated with mass entertainment of lower quality and, until the 1970s, was marginal, but gained popularity after the 1980s. Critics of this genre relate it to modern laïká, mentioning the low quality and the indispensable common part of the pista (πίστα, pl.: πίστες) "dance floor/venue".

=== Other popular trends ===
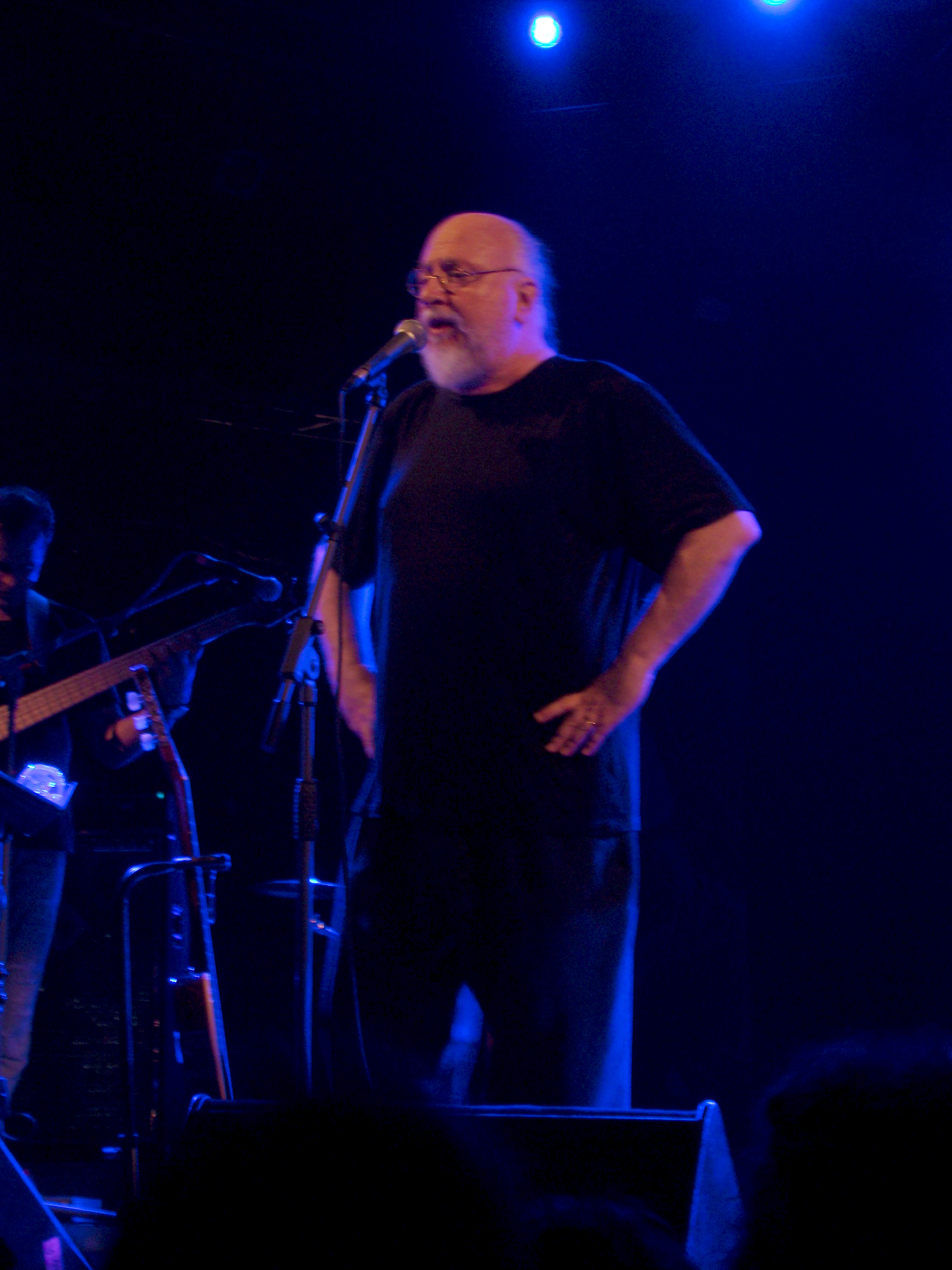
Dionysis Savvopoulos

==== New Wave (Néo Kýma) ====
Folk singer-songwriters (τραγουδοποιοί) first appeared in the 1960s after Dionysis Savvopoulos' 1966 breakthrough album Fortigó. Many of these musicians started out playing Néo Kýma, "New wave" (not to be confused with new wave music, the British-born genre), a mixture of éntekhno and chansons from France. Savvopoulos mixed American musicians like Bob Dylan and Frank Zappa with Macedonian folk music and politically incisive lyrics. In his wake came more folk-influenced performers like Arleta, Mariza Koch, Mihalis Violaris, Kostas Hatzis and the composer Giannis Spanos. This music scene flourished in a specific type of boîte de nuit.

==== Political song ====
A notable musical trend in the 1970s (during the Junta of 1967–1974 and a few years after its end) was the rise in popularity of the topical songs (πολιτικό τραγούδι "political song"). Classic éntekhno composers associated with this movement include Mikis Theodorakis, Thanos Mikroutsikos, Giannis Markopoulos, and Manos Loïzos.

==== Other ====
Nikos Xydakis, one of Savvopoulos' pupils, was among the people who revolutionized laïkó by using orientalized instrumentation. His most successful album was 1987's Kondá sti Dóxa miá Stigmí, recorded with Eleftheria Arvanitaki.

Thanasis Polykandriotis, laïkó composer and classically trained bouzouki player, became renowned for his mixture of rebetiko and orchestral music (as in his 1996 composition "Concert for Bouzouki and Orchestra No. 1").

A popular trend since the late 1980s has been the fusion of éntekhno (urban folk ballads with artistic lyrics) with pop / soft rock music (έντεχνο ποπ-ροκ). Moreover, certain composers, such as Dimitris Papadimitriou have been inspired by elements of the classic éntekhno tradition and written song cycles for singers of contemporary éntekhno music, such as Fotini Darra. The most renowned contemporary éntekhno (σύγχρονο έντεχνο) lyricist is Lina Nikolakopoulou.

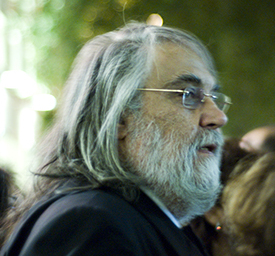
Vangelis Papathanassiou (Vangelis)

There are however other composers of instrumental and incidental music (including film scores and music for the stage), whose work cannot be easily classified, such as Stamatis Spanoudakis, Giannis Spanos, Giorgos Hatzinasios, Giorgos Tsangaris, Nikos Kypourgos, Nikos Mamangakis, Eleni Karaindrou, and Evanthia Remboutsika. Vangelis and Yanni were also Greek instrumental composers who became internationally renowned.

Even though it has always had a considerable number of listeners supporting it throughout the history of the post-1960s Greek music, it is only very recently (late 2000s) that pop-oriented music has reached the popularity of laïkó/laïká, and there is a tendency among many urban folk artists to turn to more pop-oriented sounds.

==== Artists ====
The following classification is conventional and categories may occasionally overlap with each other. Each artist is entried under the genre designation that the Greek musical press usually classifies him or her.

===== Laïkó and Skiladiko (1970s–2010s) =====
Songs from this period of Greek Laïkó were mainly influenced by the music Skiladiko, including branch of laiko music and some of the current nightclubs in Greece in which this music is performed, the country music movement and style folk-pop.

- Chryspa
- Lefteris Pantazis
- Giorgos Mazonakis
- Giorgos Xanthiotis
- Katerina Stanisi
- Nancy Alexiadi
- Nikos Makropoulos
- Panagiotis Psaltis
- Eleana Papaioannou
- Sofia Petrou
- Nikos Vertis
- Haris Kostopoulos
- Peggy Zina
- Dionysis Makris
- Yannis Ploutarchos
- Kelly Kelekidou
- Maro Litra
- Lillian Madianou
- Sotis Volanis
- Nikos Kourkoulis
- Vasilis Karras
- Panos Kiamos
- Ioanna Koutalidou
- Konstantinos Thalassohoris
- Christina Koletsa
- Pericles Stergianoudes
- Artemis Alexandratou
- Loukas Alexandrou
- Paola Foka
- Antzy Samiou
- Anneta Marmarinou
- Antonis Kardamillis
- Zafeiris Melas
- Stamatis Gonidis
- Hristina Anagnostopoulou
- Christos Kyriazis
- Angela Dimitriou
- Antypas (singer)
- Themis Adamantidis
- Christos Menidiatis
- Roula Stavrou

===== Pop and contemporary laïkó (1980–2010s) =====
- Anna Vissi (Cypriot singer) (laïká, pop)
- Alexia (Alexia Vassiliou) (Cypriot singer)
- Bessy Argyraki (pop ballads)
- Kostas Bigalis (pop, contemporary laïkó)
- Christos Dantis (pop, contemporary laïkó)
- Marianna Efstratiou
- Kostas Doxas
- Elpida
- Evridiki (Cypriot singer) (pop, contemporary laïkó)
- Thanos Kalliris (occasionally pop, ballads, contemporary laïkó)
- Nikos Karvelas (contemporary laïkó and pop composer)
- Elli Kokkinou (laïkó and pop)
- Irini Merkouri (laïkó and pop)
- Stephanos Korkolis (pop, and laïkó composer (late 1980s–'10s); piano-oriented pop singer (early 1990s)
- Mando (pop ballads, laïká)
- Natalia
- Natasa Theodoridou
- Kostas Tournas
- Giorgos Lempesis
- Stelios Maximos
- Nino (Greek singer)
- Giannis Vardis
- Elena Paparizou (a.k.a. Helena Paparizou), winner of the Eurovision Song Contest 2005 representing Greece
- Marianta Pieridi (Cypriot singer)
- Thanos Petrelis
- Polina (disco, contemporary laïkó)
- Antonis Remos (laïkó, pop)
- Grigoris Petrakos
- Michalis Rakintzis (disco, power ballad)
- Sakis Rouvas (pop ballad, dance-pop, soul)
- Despina Vandi (laïká, pop)
- Sophia Vossou (pop ballad, contemporary laïkó)

===== Europop (1990s–2010s) =====
- Artemis Gounaki (record producer, musical arranger)
- Hi-5 (girl group)
- Kalomira
- Sarbel
- Alcazar (group)
- Despina Olympiou
- Aspa Tsina
- Pandora (singer)
- Antique (band)
- Velvet (singer)
- 4 Play (Greek Pop band)
- Mystique (Greek Pop band)
- Haris Varthakouris
- Michalis Hatzigiannis (Cypriot-Greek singer)
- One (Cypriot-Greek boy band)
- Thodoris Ferris (Greek singer)
- Tamta

===== Rock and soft rock =====
====== 1970s–1980s ======
- Poll
- Nostradamos
- Socrates Drank the Conium
- Spyridoula
- Adiexodo (Greek Alternative/Punk band)
- Genia Tou Chaous
- Deus ex Machina
- Panx Romana (Greek Rock band)

====== 1990s–2010s ======
- Ble (Greek Rock band)
- C:Real (Greek Pop Rock band)
- Trypes
- Xylina Spathia
- TNT (Norwegian band)
- Giorgos Dimitriadis
- Kent (band)
- Backyard Babies
- Diafana Krina
- Mavri Magioneza
- Morá Sti Fotiá
- Domenica
- Kore. Ydro. (Indie rock band)
- Locomondo (reggae and ska band)

====== 2000s–2010s ======
- Infidelity (Indie rock band)
- Monika Christodoulou
- Emigre (Greek Alternative band)
- Kitrina Podilata
- Gymna Kalodia (Greek Rock band)
- Motivo 4 (Greek Rock band)
- Endelekheia (Alternative Band)
- Lambretta (band)
- Matisse (Post-Punk revival, Indie rock)
- Nikos Mihas (Pop punk)
- ONAR
- Onirama
- Joanna Drigo
- Raining Pleasure (anglophone Indie rock band)
- Minor Project
- Rosebleed (Alternative band)
- Simon Bloom
- The Skelters (anglophone rock band)
- Theodosia Tsatsou (Alternative)
- Ypogeia Revmata (rock band)

===== Indie and alternative =====
====== 1980s–1990s ======
- The Last Drive
- Popsicle (band)
- The Earthbound
- Madrugada (band)
- Mew (band)
- Ephemera (band)
- Antonis Livieratos
- Speaker Bite Me (Greek Indie band)
- Stereo Nova

====== 2000s–2010s ======
- Menta (Greek Alternative band)
- Xaxakes (Greek Indie band)
- Monsieur Minimal (Greek Indie band)
- Giannis Aggelakas
- Closer (Greek Alternative band)
- Laleh (singer)
- Film (Greek Alternative band)
- Figurines (band)
- Superfamily (band)
- Abbie Gale (Greek Indie band)
- Konstantinos Vita
- Michalis Delta
- Mikro

===== Mainstream hip hop and R&B (1990s–2010s) =====
- Imiskoúmbria
- Stereo Mike (solo artist)
- ZN
- Active Member
- Sadahzinia
- Stavento
- Timbuktu (Swedish rapper)
- Midenistis (Greek Hip-Hop singer)
- Stixoima
- Ominus (Greek Hip-Hop singer)
- Goin' Through (Greek Hip-Hop band)
- Nevma (Greek Hip-Hop band)
- Professional Sinnerz (Greek Hip-Hop band)
- Warlocks (band)
- Rodes (Greek Hip-Hop band)
- Sifu VERSUS
- Kafe Piperies
- Taki Tsan
- Terror X Crew
- TUS (Greek Hip-Hop singer)
- FF.C

=== Independent music scenes ===
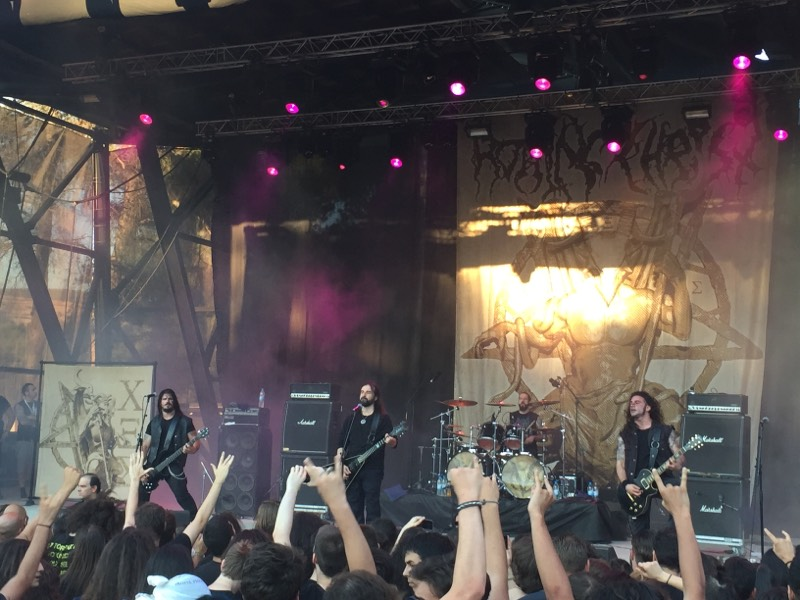
Rotting Christ on stage

Since the late 1970s, various independent scenes of "marginal" musical genres have appeared in Greece (mainly in Athens, Piraeus, and Thessaloniki). Most of them were short-lived and never gained mainstream popularity but the most prominent artists/bands of these scenes are critically acclaimed today and are considered among the pioneers of independent Greek music (each one in their own genre).

==== Genres ====
- Greek jazz ('70s: Sphinx (band), Sakis Papadimitriou, Floros Floridis, Manolis Mikelis)
- Greek blues ('80s–'10s): Blues Wire
- Blues-rock / prog rock / art rock ('70s–'80s: Socrates Drank the Conium, Aphrodite's Child, Pavlos Sidiropoulos, Spyridoula (band), Nikolas Asimos, Vasilis Papakonstantinou, Dimitris Poulikakos)
- New wave / post-punk / synthpop / gothic rock ('80s bands: Metro Decay, Film Noir, Villa 21, Anti Troppau Council; 2000s: Marsheaux)
- Greek punk ('80s–'10s bands: Adiexodo, Genia Tou Chaous, Deus ex Machina, Panx Romana)
- Greek rock ('80s–'10s bands: Trypes, Diafana Krina, Endelekheia, Xýlina Spathiá, Morá Sti Fotiá, Dytikes Synoikies)
- Indie rock (Anglophone 1990s and 2010s bands: The Last Drive, The Earthbound, I Knew Them, Film, Closer, Abbie Gale, Infidelity, Waterpipes, Monika Christodoulou)
- Low bap (Active Member, Sadahzinia, Babylona - Βαβυλώνα) / Greek hip hop (FF.C, Terror X Crew, DJ ALX, Sifu VERSUS, Eisvoleas - Εισβολέας, ZN MCs - Ζήτα Νι MCs, Vita Peis - Βήτα Πεις, Razastarr, Voreia Asteria - Βόρεια Αστέρια, Alytoi Grifoi - Άλυτοι Γρίφοι, Rodes - Ρόδες)
- Uplifting trance ('90s: Cyan, Cherouvim, Darma, Star Children)
- Acid house / techno / electronica ('90s–'10s: Stereo Nova, Mikro)
- Heavy metal (Firewind, Nightfall) / death metal (Inactive Messiah, On Thorns I Lay, Inveracity) / black metal (sometimes called Hellenic metal; Rotting Christ, Necromantia, Septicflesh, Varathron, Elysian Fields, Ravencult, Astarte, Zemial, Naer Mataron, Mortuus Caelum, Thou Art Lord) / folk black metal (Kawir, Fiendish Nymphe — sister project of the renowned Ancient Greek music revival band Daemonia Nymphe) / Extreme metal (Dephosphorus)
- Parody music / comedy rock ('80s–'10s: Tzimis Panousis, Harry Klynn)
- Neoclassical dark wave ('90s–'10s: Chaostar)
- Art punk ('80s–'10s: Lost Bodies)

== See also ==
- Music of Cyprus
- Anatolian Greek music (including Pontic Greek music)
- Greek music in Israel
- Guardians of Hellenism
- Heptanese School, the first major school (style) of Greek classical music
- List of Greek composers
- List of Greek folk musicians
- List of Greek musical artists
- Notable bouzouki players
- List of Greek guitarists
- List of Greek composers for the classical guitar
- Music of the Greek immigrant community in the United States

== Additional reading ==
- Broughton, Simon; Ellingham, Mark; Trillo, Richard (eds.). World Music, Vol. 1: Africa, Europe and the Middle East. Rough Guides. pp. 126–142. ISBN 1-85828-636-0.
- Notaras, Giorgos (1991). Το ελληνικό τραγούδι των τελευταίων 30 χρόνων (in Greek). Libanis. ISBN 960-236-148-4.
- Kalogeropoulos, Takis (2001). Λεξικό της Ελληνικής μουσικής (in Greek). Γιαλλελή. ISBN 960-7555-39-2.
- Ordoulidis, Nikos (2011). "The Greek Popular Modes" (PDF). British Postgraduate Musicology. 11. Archived from the original (PDF) on 15 April 2012.
- Xepapadakou, Avra (2013). "Pavlos Carreris". In Root, Deane (ed.). Grove Music Dictionary. New York: Oxford University Press.
