= Afroditi Laoutari =

Greek singer and actress

- Born: 1893; Patras, Greece
- Died: 1975 (aged 81–82); Athens, Greece
- Occupations: Singer, actress

Afroditi Laoutari (Greek: Αφροδίτη Λαουτάρη, 1893–1975) was a famous Greek singer and actress in musical theatre.

== Biography ==
She was born in Patras in 1893. At an early age, she became involved with the musical theatre of Ioannis Papaioannou (singer), a leading operatic producer, where it didn't take long for her voice and stage talents to be appreciated, though she was self-taught. By 1915, she was already performing lead roles with the company. From that date through the 1920s, she performed roles in many works of musical theatre, both foreign and especially, Greek operettas. She was a muse to composer and conductor Theophrastos Sakellaridis. By the early 1930s, she had retired from the theatre. She then became one of, if not the, first Greek radio announcers on Athens Radio Station (RCA) in 1938, where she was a dominating force. She continued to broadcast after the end of World War II for another decade. Sofia Vembo has been said to resemble Afroditi Laoutari at the height of her fame. She died in 1975.

== Stage performances ==
Year	Title of work (English)	Title of work (Greek)	Composer	Lyricist	Theatre	Best-known songs
1918	The Godson or The Baptismal	Ο Βαφτιστικός	Theophrastos Sakellaridis		Papaioannou Theatre	
1921	Sweet Nana	Γλυκειά Νανά	Th. Sakellaridis	Th. Sakellaridis		Sweet Nana; Nana - George
1922	Piff-Paff	Πιφ-Παφ	Th. Sakellaridis	Th. Sakellaridis	Pan-Hellenic Theatre	I'm happy; That was all
1922	For her husband's sake	Γιά ν'αρέση στον άντρα της	Th. Sakellaridis	Charalambos Anninos; Nikos Laskaris	Pan-Hellenic Theatre	Marquis & Duke; You, the married people; Edith - Kings
1923	Diabolical child	Διαβολόπαιδο	Th. Sakellaridis			Aurelia; I want it first
1923	Miss Sorolop	Δεσποινίς Σορολόπ	Th. Sakellaridis		Alhambra Theatre	
1930	Jim ... my dear	Τζίμ... Χρυσό μου			Athenian Theatre	
1931	Karambola 1931	Καραμπόλα του 1931	Panos Glykofrydis	Kostas Kioussis	Eden Theatre	Venetian Tango

== Filmography ==
- Shattered Dreams (Γκρεμισμένα όνειρα) (1949)

== Legacy ==
Laoutari has been portrayed on stage in the operetta Remember Those Years (Θυμήσου εκείνα τα χρόνια) (2008), composed by musicologist Lambros Liavas as a tribute to Theophrastos Sakellaridis.
