= Marika Papagika =

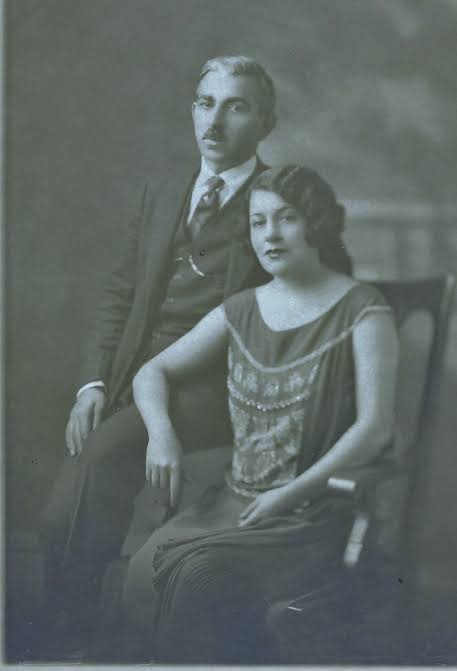
- Marika Papagika And Constantinos Papagika

Background information
- Born: Marika Katsori; September 1, 1890; Kos, Ottoman Empire
- Origin: Greece
- Died: August 2, 1943 (aged 52) New York City, U.S.
- Genres: Greek folk music, Turkish folk music, Rebetiko
- Occupation: Singer
- Years active: 1913–1937
- Labels: His Master's Voice, Columbia Records

Marika Papagika (Greek: Μαρίκα Παπαγκίκα; née Katsori (Κατσόρη); September 1, 1890 – August 2, 1943) was a Greek singer in the early 20th century and one of the first Greek women singers to be heard on sound recordings.

== Biography ==
Marika Papagika was born on the island of Kos on September 1, 1890. In late 1913 or early 1914, she recorded for the Gramophone Company in Alexandria, Egypt. Only one of those recordings has so far been found.

She emigrated to America through Ellis Island in 1915 with her husband, Kostas (Gus) Papagika, a cymbalom player who was also her accompanist. By this time, Kos had come under Italian rule.

In July 1918, she made her first trial recording in the States for Victor Records, though her first published Victor recordings were made in December of that year. In July 1919, she also began recording for Columbia Records. Marika Papagika was thus among the first to record Greek music in the USA. She also recorded a number of songs in Turkish. By 1925, Marika and Kostas had opened a nightclub in New York on W. 34th St near 8th Ave, called Marika's, likely the first café-aman—a gathering place characterized by Greek cuisine and Greek music—to appear in the States. Marika's wasn't just a café-aman, but a speakeasy for Greek people as well as for other Mediterranean immigrants. Marika's attracted not only Greeks as regular patrons but also Albanians, Arabs, Armenians, Bulgarians and Turks.

Between 1918 and 1929, she recorded at least 232 performances of café-aman styled songs, including kleftiko demotikο (Greek traditional songs about Klephts, heroic brigands), rebetiko, and light classical pieces, many of them overlapping with her chief rival in Greek music sales in the United States, Koula Antonopoulos (known on her recordings as Kyria Koula or "Madame Coula").

Marika's café-aman was a successful business until the stock market crashed. The club closed in 1930, and Marika Papagika's recording career ended, except for four sides recorded for Victor in 1937.

In her later years, Marika lived with her husband on Staten Island, New York, where she died on August 2, 1943.

== Musical style ==
Marika Papagika distinguished herself from most of her contemporaries by virtue of her sweet soprano voice with its relatively high tessitura, her vocal timbre, somewhat reminiscent of Western classical singers, and her diction. The style and sound of her recordings are further distinguished by the particular accompaniment which graced most of them, namely the unusual combination of cymbalom and violoncello, plus a violin or a clarinet, and, very occasionally, a xylophone. Her occasional forays into more purely Western songs also set her apart from her female contemporaries on both sides of the Atlantic. It is perhaps reasonable to understand the performance styles of Mr. & Mrs Papagika & Co. as a true echo of the "santouro-violi" (santouri and violin) music of the late 19th century urban Ottoman and mainland Greece.

== Musical collaborators ==
The major source of information as to Papagika's accompanists is Richard Spottswood's Ethnic Music On Records Vol 3 pp 1197–1204. Papagika was accompanied on all but about 50 of her recordings by her husband Gus and by cellist Markos Sifnios, one of very few cellists in Greek folk music recordings. The upper instrumental part was usually played by one of various violinists, including Athanasios Makedonas, Vangelis Naftis (to whom she calls out on the song "Aïdinikos Horos"), George Theologou, and the Epirot master Alexis Zoumbas (1883-1946), or by a clarinettist, most frequently Nicholas Relias (1922–1925), and on one session, Pete Mamakos. Some orchestral accompaniments were directed by Nathaniel Shilkret, some by hitherto anonymous directors.

== Revival of interest ==
After her death, Papagika's music faded into obscurity and was only available to those with access to her 78 rpm records, often collectors and enthusiasts in the US and in Greece. From 1976 onwards, with the first crop of LP reissues of Greek music from the earlier decades of the 20th century, her songs were again to be heard. In Greece, a total of at least twenty-nine of her songs were reissued on eight LPs between 1976 and 1984 (see discography). In 1984(?) a USA-produced LP featured two Papagika songs. During the analogue reissue era, Papagika was thus represented as generously on LP as her colleague Roza Eskenazi, and considerably more than Rita Abadzi and Madame Coula. Since the early 1990s, Papagika's songs have featured regularly in American, French, and Greek-produced CD reissues focusing on the musical genre often called "rebetiko", including the first reissue solely dedicated to her, a 19-track compilation released in 1994 by Alma Criolla Records, USA. In 1995, Marika Papagika was the subject of an episode of NPR’s All Things Considered where Dick Spottswood introduced her music to the North American audience. The first Greek reissue entirely dedicated to Papagika appeared in 1999, and this was expanded to a 3-CD set in 2008, presenting a grand total of 52 songs. A recent USA LP reissue has included seven songs previously not reissued.

== Songs ==
Minore from Smyrna
"Minore from Smyrna", traditional, sings Marika Papagika, 1918

This is an alphabetical selection comprising about one-sixth of Papagika's recorded output. Some songs were recorded twice.

- Ah, Giatre Mou (Oh, My Doctor!)
- Aidinikos horos (Aidinikos Dance)
- Apano Se Trikorfo Vouno (On a Triple-Peaked Mountain)
- Arahova (Arachova)
- Baghlamadhes (Baglamas)
- Bournovalio Manes (Varitera Ap' Ta Sidera) (Bournovalio Manes – Heavier That Iron)
- Daskala (Teacher)
- Dourou Dourou (Dourou Dourou)
- Elenaki (Elenaki)
- Fonias Tha Gino (I'll Become a Murderer)
- Galata Manes (Galata Manes)
- Gel Gel (Come Come)
- Hrissaido (Chrissaido)
- I Mavromata (Black-Eyed Girl)
- Katinaki mou (My Little Katina)
- Katsantonis (Katsantonis)
- Kenouria Logia Mou Pane (New Words They Said to Me)
- Kinisa o mavros (I Departed the Poor One)
- Kira Doudou (Mrs. Doudou)
- Kremete I kapota (The Shepherd's Coat is Hanging)
- Lemonaki (Little Lemon)
- Manaki mou (My Baby)
- Mantalena (Mantalena)
- Mavrideroula (Black-Skinned Girl)
- Mes Tin Agia Paraskevi (In Saint Paraskevi)
- Mes Tou Sigrou Ti filaki (In Sygros' Prison)
- Mytilinia (Girl of Mytilini)
- Ntavelis (Davelis)
- O Horos Tou Zalongou (Dance of Zalogo)
- O Marcos Botsaris (Markos Botsaris)
- Olympos Ke Kisavos (Olympos and Kissavos)
- Pismatariko (Little Obstinate Girl)
- Prosfigopoula (Little Refugee Girl)
- Psaradhes (Fishermen)
- Smyrneïko Minore (2 versions, 1918 & 1919)
- Smyrneikos Ballos (Ballos Dance of Smyrna)
- Sta Salona (In Salona)
- Sta Vervena Sta Giannena (In Vervena and Giannina)
- Sti Filaki Me Valane (The Put Me in Prison)
- Stis Arkadias Ton Platano (Under the Arcadian Plane)
- Stis Mantzouras Ton Antho (The Flower of Mandzoura)
- Tha Spaso Koupes (I'll Smash Cups)
- Ti Se Meli Esenane (What Do You Care About)
- To Koutsavaki (Bully)
- To Len I Kouki Sta Vouna (The Cuckoos Sing it on the Mountains)
- To Vlepis Kino To Vouno (Do You See That Mountain)
- Tourka Derni Ti Sklava Tis (Turkish Lady Beats Her Slave)
- A Ballad for Chanakkale
- Iskender bogazi dardir gecilmez
- Küçük Hanım (Sendeki Kaşlar Bende Olaydı)

== Discography (reissues) ==
For the sake of historical accuracy, this chronological reissue discography includes reissues from 1976 onwards. The first 8 entries refer to 33 rpm LPs. All subsequent issues (but the Mississippi LPs) are CDs.

- Ta Prota Rembetika (The First Rebetika Songs) CBS LP 53753 (1976) – 7 songs
- To Rembetiko Tragoudi vol 1 – CBS LP 82290 (1977) – 4 songs
- To Rembetiko Tragoudi vol 2 – CBS LP 82303 (1977) – 3 songs
- To Rembetiko Tragoudi vol 3 – CBS LP 26116 (1984) – 4 songs
- To Rembetiko Tragoudi vol 4 – CBS LP 26117 (1984) – 2 songs
- To Rembetiko Tragoudi vol 5 – CBS LP 26118 (1984) – 3 songs
- To Elliniko Laiko Tragoudi Stin Ameriki – Falirea 22/23 (1984) – 6 songs
- Greek-Oriental Rebetica: Songs And Dances In The Asia Minor Style. The Golden Years: 1911–1937 – Arhoolie Folklyric Records (LP 9033, 1984?, CD 7005 1991) – 2 songs
- Rembetica – Historic Urban Folk Songs From Greece – Rounder CD 1079 (1992) – 1 song
- Marika Papagika – Greek Popular and Rebetic Music in New York 1918–1929 – Alma Criolla ACCD802 (1994) – 19 songs
- Smirneiko et Rebetiko – Les grandes chanteuses, 1915–1936 Silex Memoire, Auvidis Y225114 (1995) – 6 songs
- To Elliniko Tragoudi Stin Ameriki – Ixografiseis 1918–1929 – Difono-Hellenic Record C 1011 (1999) – 18 songs
- Women Of Rembetica – Rounder CD 1121 (2000) – 1 song
- Mortika – Rare Vintage Recordings From A Greek Underworld – ARKOCD008 (2005) (2LP Mississippi MR-043 2009) – 1 song
- Rembetika – Greek Music From The Underground – JSP 77105 (2006) – 2 songs
- Black Mirror – Reflections in Global Musics (1918–1954) – Dust-To-Digital DTD-10 (2007) – 1 song
- Rembetika 2: More of the Secret History of Greece's Underground Music – JSP 77105 (2008) – 1 song
- The Greek Song In USA Marika Papagika Vol. 1: Recordings 1918 – 1929 – Hellenic Record (2008) – 19 songs
- The Greek Song In USA Marika Papagika Vol. 2: Recordings 1923 – 1929 – Hellenic Record (2008) – 16 songs
- The Greek Song In USA Marika Papagika Vol. 3: Recordings 1919 – 1929 – Hellenic Record (2008) – 17 songs
- The Further The Flame The Worse It Burns Me – Greek Folk Music in New York City 1919–1928 – Mississippi MR-071(2010) – 11 songs
- To What Strange Place – The Music Of The Ottoman-American Diaspora (1916–1929) – Tompkins Square TSQ 2618 (2011) – 4 songs
- Rembetika 7: Women of Rembetika – JSP77152 (2012) – 8 songs
