= Guardians of Hellenism =

The Guardians of Hellenism (Greek: Έλληνες Ακρίτες) is a series of albums featuring recordings of traditional Greek music by region, performed by the Hellenic Music Archives Ensemble.

== Albums ==
Years of release are in parentheses

- Vol. 1 (1998) - Chios, Mytilene, Samos, Ikaria
- Vol. 2 (1998) - Lemnos, Samothrace, Imbros, Tenedos
- Vol. 3 (1998) - Smyrna, Ionian Coast
- Vol. 4 (1999) - Pontos, Cappadocia
- Vol. 5 (2000) - Constantinople, Sea of Marmara, Bithynia
- Vol. 6 (2000) - Thrace, Eastern Roumelia, Black Sea
- Vol. 7 (2000) - Macedonia, Thassos
- Vol. 8 (2000) - Epirus
- Vol. 9 (2000) - Patmos, Kalymnos, Leros, Kos, Astypalea
- Vol. 10 (2000) - Carpathos, Cassos, Castellorizo
- Vol. 11 (2000) - Rhodes, Symi, Chalki, Tilos, Nisyros
- Vol. 12 (2000) - Cyprus
- Vol. 13 (2001)- Crete
- Vol. 14 (2002)- Ionian Islands

== See also ==
- Music of Greece
