= Greek music in Israel =

Popular genre in Israel

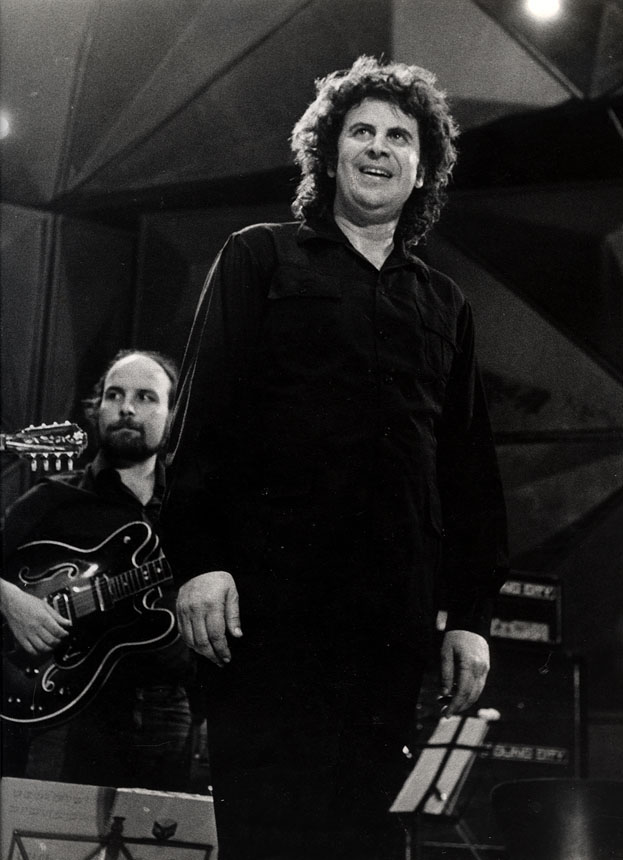
Mikis Theodorakis concert in the Roman Amphitheater in Caesarea, Israel in the 1970s

Greek music in Israel is very popular and Greek musicians often visit Israel while on world tours. Popular Greek singers who have performed in Israel include Manolis Angelopoulos, Eleftheria Arvanitaki, George Dalaras, Haris Alexiou, Glykeria, Nikos Vertis and Natassa Theodoridou. In December 2012 Natasa Theodoridou performed some of her songs in Tel Aviv Performing Arts Center in Hebrew. In 2007 during the interview of Shimon Peres by Hellenic Broadcasting Corporation on George Dalaras concert in Israel, President Shimon Peres stated: "In Israel we love the Greek Music. For us Greece is a country but also a melody".

== History ==
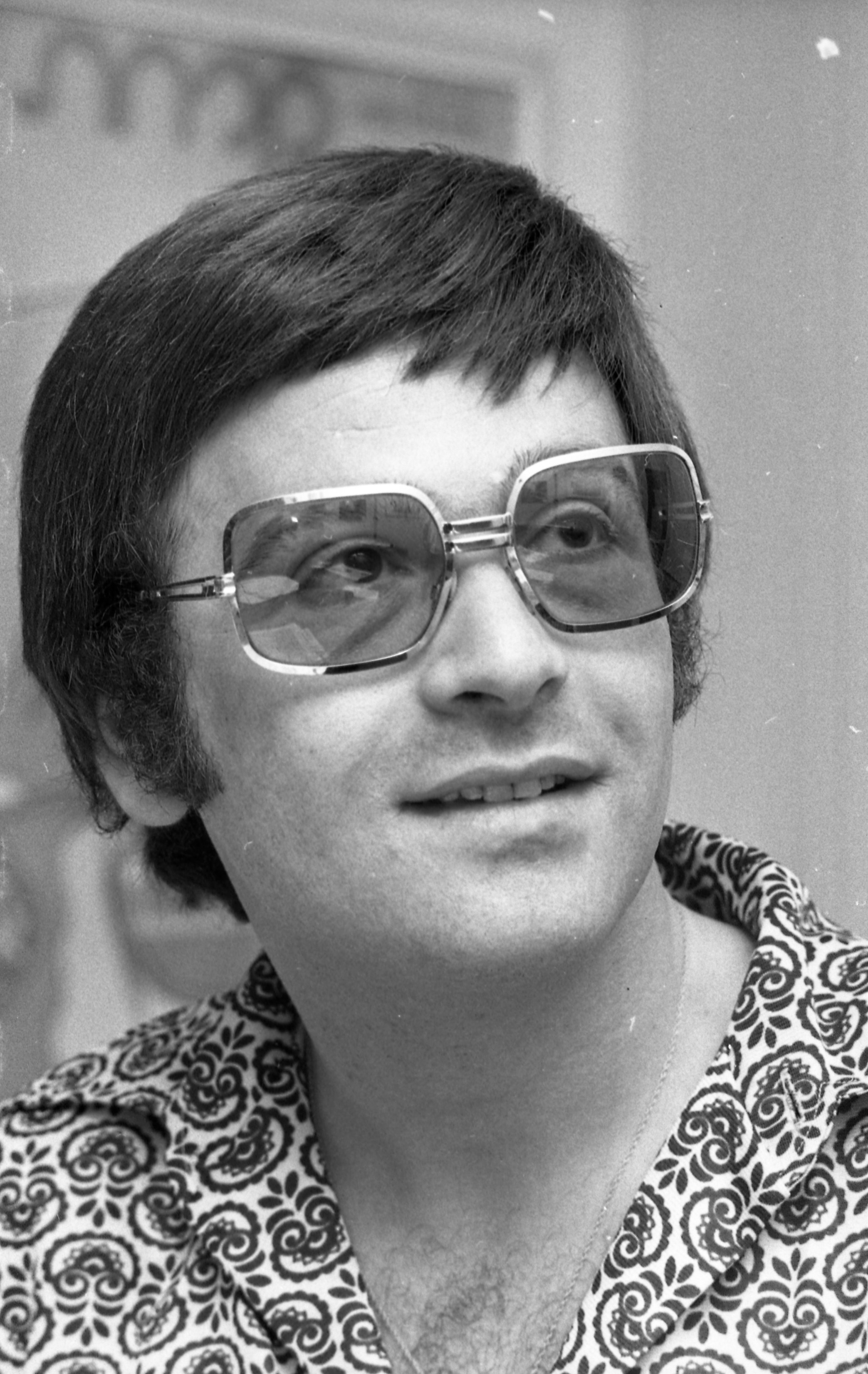
Aris San helped popularise Greek music in Israel in the 1950s and 1960s.

Greek-style bouzouki music became increasingly popular in the early 1960s. Aris San, a non-Jewish Greek singer who moved to Israel and became an Israeli citizen, was the driving spirit behind this trend, though uniquely he used an electric guitar rather than the bouzouki in his songs, giving them a rock-like sound. One of Aris San's hit songs was "Sigal" (lyrics by Yovav Katz). Aris San, who worked at the Zorba club in Jaffa, owned and opened by Shlomo Bachramov wrote songs for Aliza Azikri (Bahayim hakol over, Yesh ahava ata omer), that effectively broke down the barriers between Israeli song and the world of Greek and Mizrahi music. The songs of the iconic Greek singer Stelios Kazantzidis were translated into Hebrew and performed by the country's leading singers.

Many of the songs of Stelios Kazantzidis have been translated into Hebrew and performed by Israeli singers. Yaron Enosh, an Israeli Radio broadcaster who often plays Greek music on his programs, described the singer's ability to combine joy with sorrow: "This is the task of music: to touch the entire range of feelings...Kazantzidis could do this; he played on all the strings." To the Greek Jews who immigrated to Israel, Kazantzidis was "the voice of the world they left behind, for good or for bad." According to the operator of Radio Agapi, a station that plays Greek music 24 hours a day, "Kazantzidis was the voice of the people, of the weary, the exploited, the betrayed. And the voice of the refugee and the emigre, too."

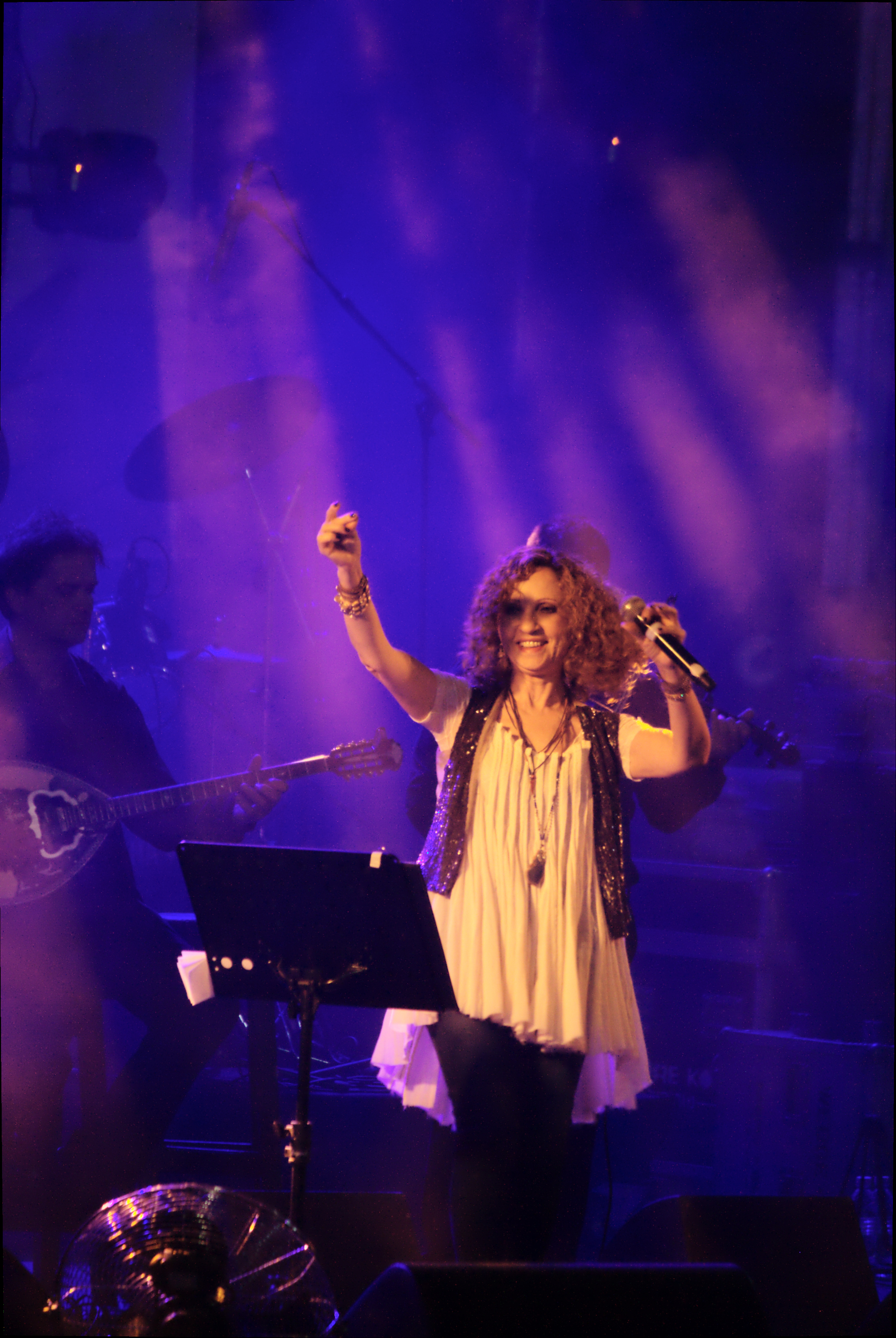
Glykeria during a concert held in Rishon Le-Zion, September 2013

== Greek music day ==
A special broadcasting day of Greek classical and modern music was organised on 12 June 2013 by the Israel Broadcasting Authority, in cooperation with the Embassy of Greece in Tel Aviv. The program started with an hourly show, presented by Ambassador Lampridis and the Director of the Radio Station Arie Yass with an emphasis on the roots and the historical evolution of modern Greek music. During the whole day, Kol Ha Musica broadcast works of modern Greek composers including Hatzidakis, Theodorakis, Spanoudakis, Remboutsika, Karaidrou, Mikroutsikos and Markopoulos. The programme also included Sephardi music from Thessaloniki and Rhodes. Israeli Radio show "Yaron Enosh" is almost completely dedicated to Greece, the Greek culture, music, philosophy and history and has an audience of approximately 800,000 Israeli listeners. In Israel there are 12 internet radio stations that broadcast exclusively Greek music.

== See also ==
- Jewish music
- Music of Israel
- Mizrahi music, which is partially influenced by Greek music, as well as other cultures.
