= Stixoima =

Greek hip-hop band

Stihoima
- Origin: Athens, Greece
- Genre: Rap
- Years active: 1999–Present
- Label: None
- Members: Xplicit, Marina, Sifounas

Stihoima is a Greek Hip-Hop band founded in 1999.

== History ==
It all started in the late 90s when Xplicit and Thirio made their first steps in Freestyle Productions the label of Active Member. The collaboration with Freestyle Productions was short and the crew left the label. In 2003 the crew released their first album, called I Ptosh ton aggelon (The Fall of the angels). The album has intense political lyrics, referring to the situation that was dominated in the Greek society before the Olympic Games 2004. By releasing this album Stixoima became the first Greek group that prosecuted legally for the lyrics, after 1974, because of the track called Gia enan megalo ethnarxi (For a great ethnarch) which was referred to Archbishop Christodoulos. The production was made by Marina. In 2004 the crew released the second album called 4eis Daimones (Four Demons). After this album Thirio was distanced from the crew and left in 2005. In 2006 Stixoima released their third album called Geraki sto xoma (Hawk on the ground). This album became a milestone in the history of the crew, as many tracks became success and played in many radio stations, or even MAD TV without any promotion. The productions was made by Marina.Stixoima were inactive from 2007 till 2012 as Xplicit was participate in Athens Giants, a battle rap crew.

However, in 2012 Stixoima released their fourth and the most successful album called Michanes (Machines). The album became a success in less than a month. In track called Niose mas (Feel us) Xplicit raps as an immigrant while in the whole album there are inferences in Grigoropoulos' murder, Golden Dawn, Fascism and Immigration problem in Greece. The beats by Marina were also awesome. In 2013 the crew did 2 historical lives in Athens and Thessaloniki, so that the fans showed their liking to the album.

== Discography ==
=== Η πτώση των αγγέλων - I Ptosh ton aggelon (The Fall of the angels) ===
- Released: 2003
- Label: Independent Production, Ήχοτρον Productions
- Producer: Marina, Thirio
- Style: Conscious

=== Τέσσερεις Δαίμονες - Tessereis Daimones (Four Demons) ===
- Released: 2004
- Label: Independent Production
- Producer: Marina, Thirio
- Style: Conscious

=== Γεράκι στο χώμα - Geraki sto xoma (Hawk on ground) ===
- Released: 2006
- Label: Independent Production
- Producer: Marina
- Style: Conscious

=== Μηχανές - Michanes (Machines) ===
- Released: 2012
- Label: Independent Production
- Producer: Marina, (and some tracks collaboration with Kid)
- Style: Conscious
- Duration: 79:33

==== Track listing ====
1. Αρχή - Archi (The beginning)
2. Μηχανές - Michanes (Machines)
3. Πατρίδα - Patrida (Motherland)
4. Δαίμονας - Daimonas (Demon)
5. To Τσίρκο - To Tsirko (The Circus)
6. Εδώ Αθήνα - Edo Athina (Here is Athens)
7. Το γρανάζι - To granazi (The cogwheel)
8. Είμαι χαμένος - Eimai chamenos (I'm lost)
9. Δικό μου - Diko mou (It's mine)
10. Η συμμορία των δέκα - H symmoria ton deka (The gang of ten)
11. Ο τοίχος - O toixos (The wall)
12. Γενιά μες στα σκουπίδια - Genia mes sta skoupidia (A generation amid the garbage)
13. Νιώσε μας - Niose mas (Feel us)
14. Ό,τι δεν σας κάνει - Oti den sas kanei (Whatever you don't like)
15. Τα όνειρα μου - Ta oneira mou (My dreams)
16. Στην αγκαλία του Μάρκου - Stin agkalia tou Markou (In Markos' hug)
17. Βία - Bia (Violence)
18. Είμαι λάθος - Eimai lathos (I'm wrong)
19. Άνθρωποι - Anthropoi (Humans)
20. Τέλος - Telos (The end)
