= Dionysius Rodotheatos =

Greek conductor and composer

Dionysius Rodotheatos (Greek: Διονύσιος Ροδοθεάτος, Italian: Dionisio Rodoteato; c. 1849, Ithaca – 1892, Corfu) was a Greek conductor and composer.

== Biography ==
His father was a prominent judge from Ithaca, but Rodotheatos passed his youth in Corfu, where he received his first lessons in the study of music with Nikolaos Mantzaros, the 'father' of the Ionian school.

After staying at Corfu for some time he travelled to Italy in order to continue his studies at the Conservatorio di Musica Giuseppe Verdi of Milan. It seems likely that Alberto Mazzucato, who served as a music director at the Conservatorio, was one of his teachers, who had encouraged him to stage one of his first operas. According to Motsenigos, Rodotheatos also studied for seven years at the Conservatorio di Musica San Pietro a Majella in Naples between 1864 and 1871, as did many students including Cavaliere Nikolaos Mantzaros. In 1875 Rodotheatos went again to Corfu, where he taught counterpoint and harmony, brought out works of almost all genera and in the same year became a Member of the Board and Vice Director of the musical department 'of the Teatro San Giacomo of Corfu'. His works were played in Athens and Italy.

Due to mental illness, he was placed in the lunatic asylum of Corfu, where he died in 1892.

Except for the three symphonic works most of his compositions have been lost. Apart from works for piano and choral music he wrote some Italian language operatic and symphonic music. There are also numerous marches and other works for wind band. He was also the author of the first Greek-speaking harmony work, Πραγματεία Θεωρητικὴ καὶ πρακτικὴ περὶ ἁρμονίας (Pragmatia Theoritiki ke praktiki peri Armonias), which appeared in 1886 in Corfu.

== Works ==
- Oitona, opera in one act by Oithona, one of the 'Songs of Ossian' (1875/76). Another unknown opera title, the 1881 in Trieste was first performed, is lost.
- Atalia, symphonic poem in seven sets
- Lo Cid, symphonic poem in six movements (see El Cid)
- Allegorical ideas (Ἀλληγορικές ἰδέες), Rhapsody [for Orchestra]
- Funeral March for the death of Victor Emmanuel II [Wind Band]
- Ὕμνος πρὸς τὴν Πατρίδα / Ymnos pros tin Patrida / Anthem for the Fatherland [for four solo voices, mixed chorus and piano]
- Dithyramb [for three-part male choir]
- Ἐπίκλησις εἰς τὴν Ἐλευθερίαν / Epiklisis is tin Eleftherian / Invocation of freedom [for male choir and piano]
- Elvira (Polka Mazur for piano)
- Ermelinda (Polka Mazur [for piano])

== See also ==
- Athalia (Handel)
