= Endelekheia =

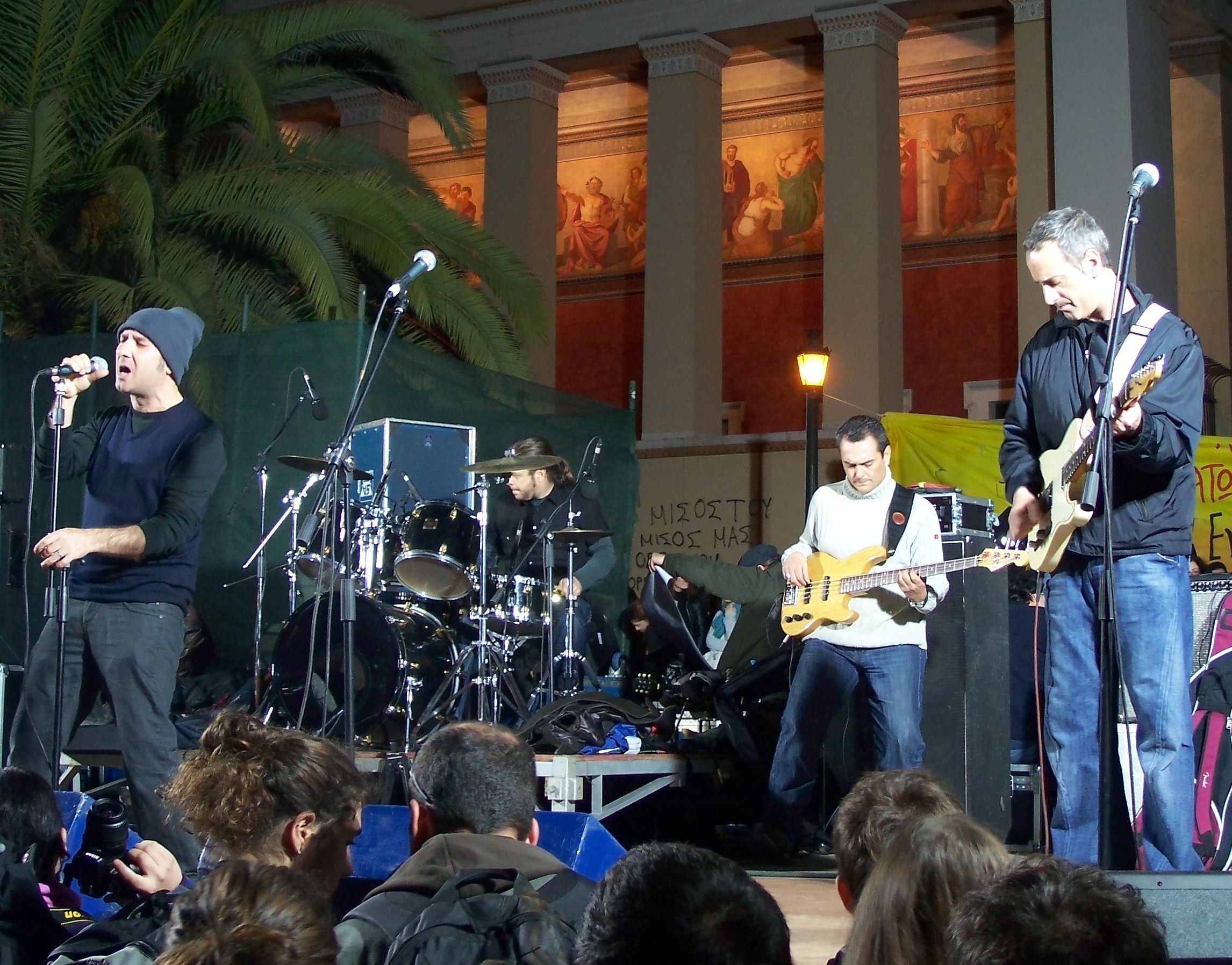
Greek indy band Endelehia

Endelekhia (Greek: Ενδελέχεια) is a rock band consisting of Dimitris Mitsotakis (lyrics, drums, vocals), Dimitris Leontopoulos (vocals, acoustic guitar), Antonis Dimitriou (electric guitars, vocals), Andreas Vaitoudis (keyboards, samples) and Yorgos Koulouris (bass). The band took shape in 1991 in Athens.

== Discography ==
=== 1994 Endelekhia ===
1. 87 ST'
2. Tis modas opados
3. Dos' mou ena rolo
4. Symperasma
5. Enantia se kathe logiki
6. Alogos - Paralogos
7. Diadromes
8. Sa dromos viastikos
9. Mono gia ligo
10. Skliro Kharti
11. Aristotelous 130
12. Panta th' akougontai oi penies mas

=== 1996 Einai edo... o, ti einai kai pio pera (Εros music) ===
1. Ein' edo
2. 38.52
3. Pos na poume tora alla paramythia
4. Akou Vlepe Mila
5. Logia kopse
6. Υparkhoun lekseis
7. To terma t' ouranou
8. O Aunan!
9. O diarriktis
10. To katakathi
11. Enoikoi
12. O fovos

=== 1997 Voutia apo psila (Fm records) ===
1. O erotas
2. Diamantenia provlita
3. Mikres khares
4. Kante pera
5. Pezo (na psakhnoume prosegisi...)
6. Daneika
7. Voutia apo psila
8. Zoes paralliles
9. I farsa
10. Misi selida enokhes
11. ELa
12. Pezo (...kato apo tis kornes ton okhimaton)

=== 1999 Khartines saites (Fm records) ===
1. Katadikos
2. Eimaste edo
3. Na 'rtho ki apopse
4. Mas kathreftizei i vrokhi
5. Soasmeni gefira
6. Den eimai autos pou thes
7. Katse sti gonia sou
8. Pou na se vro
9. Stigmes
10. Khartines saites
11. Klostes

=== 2000 Kathreftis, multimedia CD single (Fm records) ===
1. Bagasas
2. Stin arkhi tou tragoudiou
3. Tha s' antanaklo

=== 2001 Sta sinora tis mera, multimedia CD (Fm records) ===
1. Den sas milo ego
2. Oi nykhtes
3. Na kao
4. An nostalgo
5. Kapoios me vlepei
6. O teleios ponos
7. Me tin agapi
8. Ola edo gyrnane
9. To koritsi
10. O ksenos
11. Ti tragoudi na sou po
12. I fotografi
13. Fonissa mana
14. Prosmoni

=== 2003 Mia petalouda pou ksefeugei (Fm records) ===
1. An eikhe dyo ilious touti h gi
2. I petalouda
3. Ma ein' arga
4. Krisi panikou
5. Ta logia
6. Den yparkhei epistrofi
7. O drapetis
8. Imerologio
9. Fthinoporo
10. Isoun ekei
11. Tou augoustou khalazi
12. Pes mou

=== 2005 Mesa mou kryvontai alloi (Fm Records) ===
1. De thelo na thymamai
2. Edo mori, tha legesai Maria
3. Paraskeui
4. To astiko
5. Panta tha feugo
6. O erotas pou zitise polla
7. Eimai ena lathos
8. Kai epese sti gi
9. Ta tragoudia mou einai kleftes
10. Mikri istoria
11. O vrakhos
12. Otan tha 'rthei ksana to kalokeri
