= Diafana Krina =

Greek rock group (1991-2009)

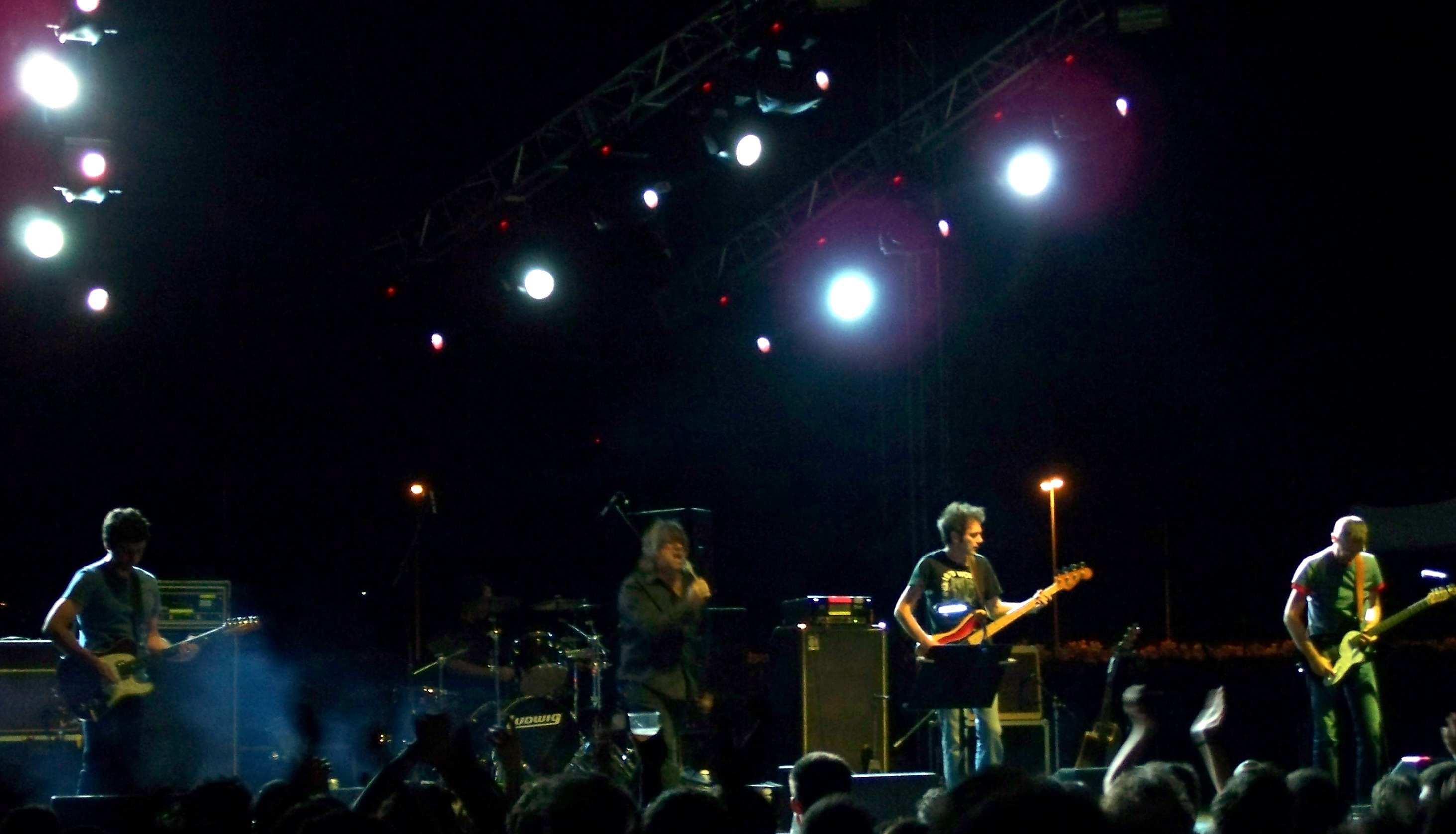
- Diafana Krina on a live gig, July 2007

Background information
- Origin: Greece
- Genres: Alternative rock; gothic rock; psychedelic rock; art rock
- Years active: 1990–2009, 2016
- Labels: WipeOut Records Greece; This Is My Voice Records; Diafana Krina
- Members: Thanos Anestopoulos; Pantelis Rothostoglou; Nikos Bardis; Kyriakos Tsoukalas; Tasos Machas

Diafana Krina (Greek: Διάφανα Κρίνα, which translates in English as 'Transparent Lilies') was a Greek rock band. It consisted of Thanos Anestopoulos (vocals, acoustic guitar, piano), Pantelis Rodostoglou (bass), Nikos Bardis (electric guitar, trumpet), Kyriakos Tsoukalas (electric guitar), Tassos Machas (drums) and (from 1996 until 2000) Panagiotis Berlis (keyboards, vocals). Their special characteristic (apart from their distinct baritone voice of Anestopoulos) is that they set to music poems (most written by bassist Rodostoglou) rather than conventional lyrics.

== History ==
Diafana Krina, Greek for "translucent lilies," formed in 1991. In 1994, they released their first single 'Λιώνοντας μόνος-κάτω από το ηφαίστειο' (Greek for "Melting alone-under the volcano") by Wipe Out. They followed this in 1996 with the LP 'Έγινε η απώλεια συνήθειά μας', which featured Panagiotis Berlis (keyboards/vocals) as the sixth member of the group. In 1997, they participated in the 'Rock of Gods' festival in Athens together with The Sisters of Mercy and New Model Army. In 1998, they released their second LP 'Κάτι σαράβαλες καρδιές' and performed in several concerts around Greece. They also toured as a supporting act for the Tindersticks Athens concert. In 2000, after Panagiotis Berlis departed from the group, they released a single 'Είναι που όλα ήρθαν αργά' and an album 'Ευωδιάζουν αγριοκέρασα οι σιωπές'. In 2001, they performed three concerts in the UK: (London at Dingwalls, Manchester at The Roadhouse and Brighton at Concorde 2). In 2003, the LP 'Ο,τι απόμεινε απ' την ευτυχία' was released, followed by the 2005 instrumental LP 'Ο γύρος της μέρας σε 80 κόσμους' (Greek for "Around the day in 80 worlds", inspired by the title of Jules Verne's famous story Around the World in Eighty Days). It was released together with a book containing poetry and tales. On June 1, 2009, the band announced their disbandment. The statement was signed by all band members apart from Anestopoulos.

Anestopoulos succumbed to cancer in September 2016.

== Discography ==
=== Studio albums ===
- Egine i apolia synithia mas (Έγινε η απώλεια συνήθειά μας - Loss became our habit) - 1996
- Kati saravales kardies (Κάτι σαράβαλες καρδιές - Some Wrecked Hearts) - 1998
- Evodiazoun agriokerasa i siopes (Ευωδιάζουν αγριοκέρασα οι σιωπές - Silence Gives the Odour of Wild Cherries) - 2000
- Oti apomine ap tin eftihia (Ο,τι απόμεινε απ' την ευτυχία - All that's left of happiness) - 2003
- O giros tis meras se 80 kosmous (Ο γύρος της μέρας σε 80 κόσμους - Around the Day in 80 Worlds) - 2005
- Ki i agapi pali tha kali (Κι η αγάπη πάλι θα καλεί -And love will be calling again) - 2008

=== EP ===
- Lionontas Monos/Kato apo to ifaistio (Λιώνοντας μόνος / Κάτω απ’ το ηφαίστειο - Melting Alone / Under the Volcano) - 1994
- Ine pou ola irthan arga (Είναι που όλα ήρθαν αργά - It's that everything came late) - 2000
- Kainourios Topos / Kato apo to ifaistio - (Καινούργιος τόπος / Κάτω απ’ το ηφαίστειο - New Land / Under the volcano) - 2001
