= The Skelters =

Greek rock band

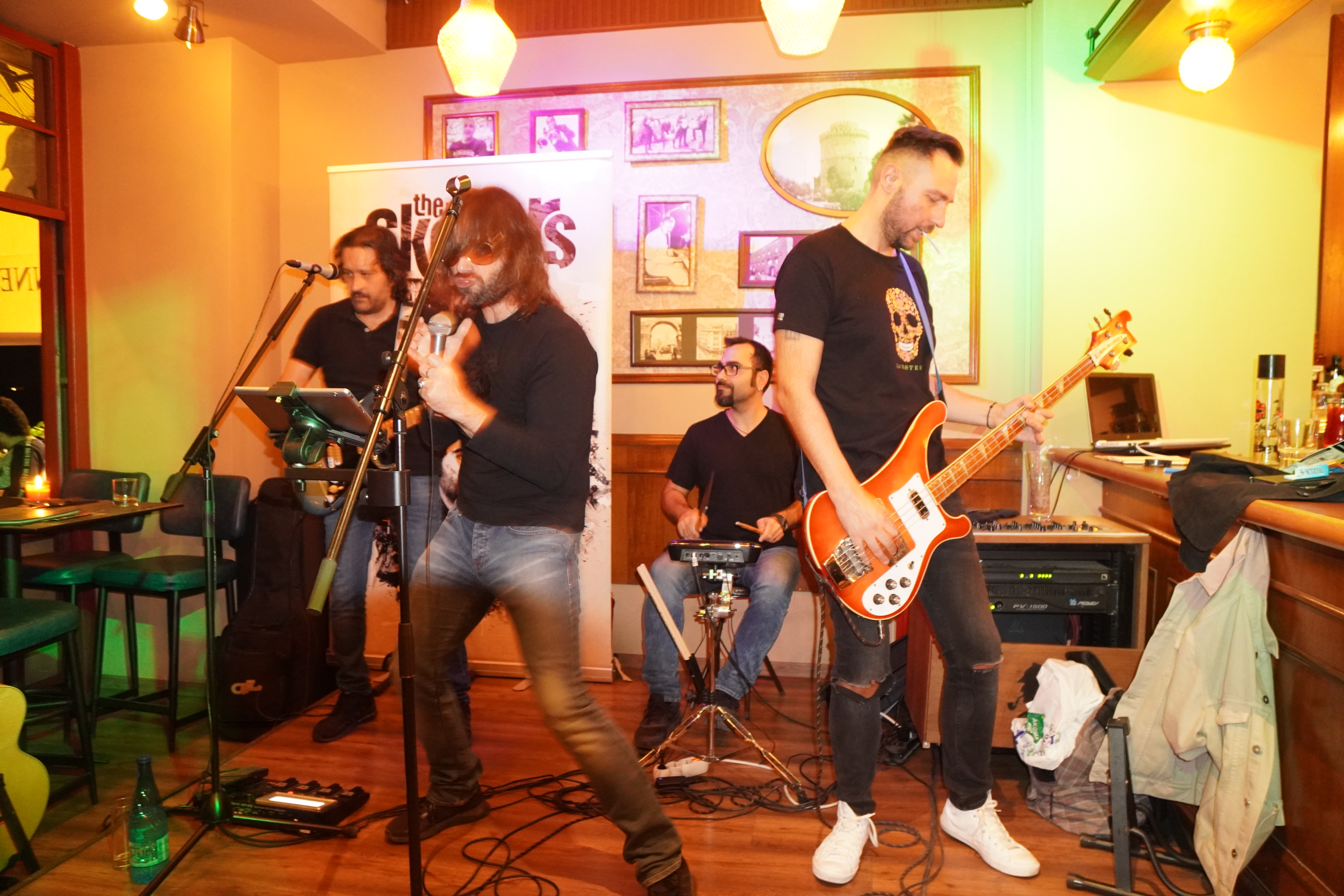
- Origin: Thessaloniki, Greece
- Genre: Pop rock, rock, rock and roll, hard rock, disco
- Years active: 1996–present
- Current members: Angel Harvits (singer/guitarist/bassist); Daniel Charavitsidis (drummer/vocalist); Kostis Vogiatzoglou (lead guitarist/vocalist)
- Past member: Stavros Amanatidis (lead guitarist/vocalist, 2001–2016) Thodoris Nikolaou (bassist, 2003-2023)
- Website: https://www.theskelters.com

The Skelters is a Greek rock band formed in Thessaloniki in 1996 by brothers Angel Harvits (born Aggelos Charavitsidis; vocals, guitar, bass) and drummer/vocalist Daniel Charavitsidis. The original lineup was completed with lead guitarist/vocalist Stavros Amanatidis and bassist Thodoris Nikolaou. They have appeared in several live stages throughout Greece and supported many other artists such as ZZ Top and Pavlov's Dog.Some of their main influences are The Beatles, John Lennon, U2, Queen, and Elvis Presley. The first album of The Skelters is entitled Explain To Me and was released in 2009.

== History ==
From a very young age, Angel Harvits and his younger brother Daniel developed an interest for classic Rock ‘n Roll music which ultimately resulted in the original band The Crickets in 1996. The name was later on in 2001 changed to The Skelters, because The Crickets was already used as a band’s name (Buddy Holly and The Crickets). The name Skelters was an idea coming from the original The Beatles' song "Helter Skelter" which has been the main influence of the band since its formation. Up until 2003, the lineup has changed several times, yet always consisting of Angel and Daniel. The lead guitarist and vocalist Stavros Amanatidis joined the band in 2001, while the bassist Thodoris Nikolaou in 2004. Immediately after its formation, the band started appearing live locally counting more than 1,000 appearances all over Greece to date. They have appeared in the most important live stages in Thessaloniki and Athens, festivals, TV and radio shows. Also, they were the support act for other artists such as ZZ Top, Nazareth, Iron Butterfly, Pavlov's Dog, Steve Harley & Cockney Rebel and Louisiana Red, helping the band to gain more recognition and fame. Also, the band is known for its legendary tributes to artists like The Beatles, John Lennon, Queen, Elvis Presley and U2, which have been the main influence of the band since its formation.

== First public appearance (1998–1999) ==
Their first public appearance was in May 1998 at the elementary school of Tagarades. In February 1999 the band appeared for the first time in a TV show Jammin in National Television. The Crickets -as they were called at the time- was the youngest band who ever appeared in that particular show! When they appeared for the second time on that show, in May of the same year, Stavros Amanatidis, the third member of The Skelters was on the guitar.

== Development ==
In the period of 1998-2000, the band had already composed three original songs. From 2001, the band’s performances became more often and they began to appear in important live stages such as Mesogeios Live Stage and Café Americain supporting the well established group Blues Wire. In March 2002 they appeared at a concert in the Cultural Center of Thermi, where they performed their original songs live. In November of that year they recorded for the first time one of their songs, "Let’s Go Party". In December they recorded another one of their songs "See How Much I Love You". In July 2003, they recorded "Now Is The Chance" and in September "It's a Pity". In January 2004, the fourth member, Thodoris Nikolaou, bassist, officially joined the band. The same month, the band paid a great tribute to Elvis Presley with a very special gig at Mylos live Stage in Thessaloniki. In February, they recorded "She Is a Liar". In April to May 2005, they supported Blues Wire once again in their appearances at Café Americain. In early 2006, they put on another tribute to Elvis Presley, as well as a series of tribute nights to The Beatles at Mylos Club in Thessaloniki. In November, the band paid tribute to Queen and the late Freddie Mercury, performing numerous songs of their discography. In December, another live tribute for John Lennon was done. In 2007, they continued to perform live tributes, that time to U2 and The Beatles, while making appearances throughout Greece. The appearance supporting Louisiana Red and Blues Wire at Mylos Club in Thessaloniki was a great success. In 2008 The Skelters performed live their song "Let's Go Party" on a very popular Greek TV show, Radio Arvyla. That year, they also supported Iron Butterfly on a concert in Thessaloniki and jammed with Puressence. Moreover, they supported Paul Di' Anno on a concert in Thessaloniki Port.

On 25 May 2009, the band released its first album Explain to Me distributed by Pan Vox. In the summer of 2009 they performed at the popular river party in Nestorio, at the city of Kastoria. On October 24, they were chosen to be the opening act for the ZZ Top concert in Athens, where they performed in front of a 10,000 people audience. On 22 December 2009 they reappeared at the popular TV show Radio Arvyla where they performed their song "She Is a Liar". On 30 December they did a very special one-time tribute Elvis Presley vs The Beatles at Mylos Club. A music video for "See How Much I Love You" was released on 18 June 2010. On 10 November 2010, they were chosen as the opening act for Pavlov's Dog concert in Thessaloniki. Also, on 8 December 2010 The Skelters paid tribute to John Lennon, 30 years after his assassination, with a concert at Mylos Club in Thessaloniki. A music video for "Explain to Me" was released on 19 June 2011. On 9 April 2011, they are the open act of the Steve Harley & Cockney Rebel concert, at Principal club theater, Thessaloniki. From February 2013 till February 2016, the band appeared at Blue Barrel, one of the most famous live stages in Thessaloniki. Meanwhile, they often gave live concerts at the historic Malt N΄ Jazz and other places in Thessaloniki. In 2016, Stavros Amanatidis leaves the band and is replaced by Kostis Vogiatzoglou.

On October 10, 2016, the band released their first official music video for the song "Win This Fight", followed by the release of their second album, Revive, on October 31, 2016. In November 2016 they released a promo video for the song "You Showed Me". In May 2017 they released a promo video for "What I'm Gonna Do". On 16 June 2017 they played as guest band at Principal Club Theater in Thessaloniki with Nazareth. In 2019 for the needs of the theatrical performance "Football, The game of humanity" they are asked and record the song "We Are The Champions" by Queen where it was played in every performance. On November 29, 2021, on the occasion of the 20th anniversary of the death of George Harrison, they publish on YouΤube their cover of the song "All Things Must Pass". In February 2022 they publish on YouΤube another studio cover of the song "Let Me Roll It" by Paul McCartney On August 31, 2022, they performed a live tribute to Elvis Presley and The Beatles at "Para thin' alos" in Aretsou Beach. In June 2023, the band performed at Matala Festival, where it presented a tribute to The Beatles. In 2023, the band ended its collaboration with long-time bassist Thodoris Nikolaou, who had been a member for 20 years. Since then, Αngel Harvits has taken over bass duties in both live performances and studio recordings.

In August 2025, the band released the single "Awesome", featuring its new line-up (Angel Harvits, Kostis Vogiatzoglou and Daniel Charavitsidis). A promotional video for the song was also released on their official YouTube channel. In September 2025, the band released the single "That's Right". A promotional video for the song was also released. On 10 October 2025, the band released its third album, Con Man's Chronicles.

== History and analysis of songs ==
Each song on the first album of The Skelters, Explain to Me, has its own history and all the songs were written in different periods. The lyrics of the songs are mostly inspired by everyday life and real events experienced by members of the band. Because of the many musical influences of The Skelters, each song has its own style. "Let's Go Party" is a pure rock n 'roll song with uplifting mood, influenced by The Beatles, Little Richard, Deep Purple, Led Zeppelin and Kiss. The music is written by Angel, but the lyrics are from Angel, Daniel and Stavros. "My Life Has Changed" is a love ballad and is closer to the style of John Lennon, George Harrison and Queen. The music was composed by Angel and Stavros, while the lyrics were written by Daniel. "See How Much I Love You", which was also converted to a video clip, is a rock ballad. The lyrics and music were written by Angel and the song is a stylish mix of The Beatles, U2 and Bon Jovi. "Explain to Me" is dedicated to the greatest musical influence of the band, John Lennon, and speaks of world peace and love. Lyrics and music were written by Angel in 1998. "Now Is the Chance" is a classic rock song. The music was composed by Angel, while the lyrics were written by Daniel and Stavros. "She Is a Liar" is a dance funk rock track, influenced by The Beatles, U2, Queen, Michael Jackson and the 80s music style. The music was composed by Angel, while the lyrics were co-written by Angel and Daniel. "It's a Pity" is a blues rock song, with lyrics from Daniel, speaks of the broken hearted men from women. Influences of the song are The Beatles, Gary Moore and Led Zeppelin. "Corruption" is a hard rock song talking about corruption in the world. The music is composed by Angel and the lyrics were written by Daniel and Stavros. "Journey" is an instrumental blues, rock, funk song, with influences from Blues Wire and Stevie Ray Vaughan. In conclusion, the nine songs of the album vary musically and each one has its own "music personality" and story.

The band's second album, Revive, was influenced by The Beatles, U2, John Lennon, and Oasis. More specifically, U2 were the influences for the tracks "Another Chance", "What I'm Gonna Do", "Nothing At All" and "Living Like I'm Dying" mainly on the guitars and the main voice. For the song "You Showed Me" the influence of Angel was the song of John Lennon "How Do You Sleep" from the album Imagine of 1971. While the songs "Win This Fight" and "Stay With Me Tonight" are influenced by The Beatles and especially from their three part harmony vocals. The song "What I'm Gonna Do" is mainly a composition by Angel which he started to create on the piano in the summer of 2011. In 2014 the other Skelters were added to the final composition of the song. The bass line written by Thodoris is influenced by U2.

Con Man’s Chronicles, The Skelters' third album, is a concept album, focusing on themes such as the internal and external struggles of artists, illusion, ego, and survival in a demanding environment. The opening track of the album, “Legacy”, is an instrumental piece that incorporates musical elements from the other songs on the record. In its final section, Kostis Vogiatzoglou contributes vocals accompanied by orchestral arrangements. “Awesome” is a rock song with disco-influenced basslines. According to Angel Harvits, the track is reminiscent of songs such as “Another One Bites the Dust” by Queen and incorporates influences from artists including the Bee Gees, Michael Jackson, and Dire Straits. Lyrically, it describes a character with excessive self-confidence.“Loney Rider” is a contemporary classic rock song. Thematically, it refers to a lone rider embarking on a journey with his motorcycle. According to Angel Harvits, the song originated from an initial bass riff he composed, which was further developed during rehearsals, with the addition of the chorus completing its structure. “Falling Thunder” is a rock track and the first song composed by the band in this particular lineup. Thematically, it refers to the thunderstorms and lightning encountered by a rider on the road, creating a sense of intensity and cinematic atmosphere. “Down To Earth” is a contemporary classic rock song. According to Angel Harvits, its bassline shows influences from Paul McCartney, while certain parts of the song have been noted to echo the style of Aerosmith. “Time To Trap” is a rock ’n’ roll track with clear influences from artists such as Elvis Presley, Eddie Cochran, Gene Vincent, and Little Richard. The lyrics refer to the trappers. The lyrics of “Begging For Reprice” address failure and the need for reassessment, thematically expressing disappointment, injustice, and responsibility for one’s actions. “That’s Right” is one of the band’s earlier compositions, featuring a characteristic lyrical hook in its title. Its bassline is influenced by 1970s disco. The lyrics refer to nightclub owners who are primarily interested in personal gain at the expense of musicians, as well as their demand for the presence of a female member in the band. “Pro Soul” is based on a bassline by Angel Harvits, influenced by 1960s soul, and also incorporates The Beatles' influences associated with Kostis Vogiatzoglou. The lyrics describe the attitude of musicians toward the club owner, portraying his dismissive and demeaning behavior toward them. “A Never Ending Story” is the penultimate track created before “Legacy”. The song was composed during rehearsals, with its individual sections developed separately and later combined into a unified structure. Influences from The Beatles, Pink Floyd, and Black Sabbath can be identified in the track.

== Influences ==
The main and fundamental influence of The Skelters are The Beatles. John Lennon was Angel's strongest "model" and was the reason for the creation of the band. Large influence on The Skelters are Queen, U2, Paul McCartney, George Harrison, Led Zeppelin, Rolling Stones, Elvis Presley, Bee Gees, Aerosmith, Bruce Springsteen, Little Richard, Oasis and Bon Jovi and Tom Petty. However, The Skelters have some secondary, but equally important influences. Each one plays its role in the musical interests of the members. Names such as Deep Purple, Bob Dylan, Pink Floyd, Black Sabbath, Roy Orbison, Stevie Ray Vaughan, Eric Clapton, David Bowie are added to the musical sounds and musical preferences of The Skelters. Finally, 60s, 70s, 80s and some other kinds of music, for example blues, folk, glam, disco, funk, progressive, alternative etc. complete their musical influences.

== Discography ==
2009: Explain to Me

Explain to Me was released on 25 May and distributed by Pan Vox.

1. Let's Go Party
2. My Life has Changed
3. See How Much I Love You
4. Explain to Me
5. Now Is the Chance
6. She Is a Liar
7. It's a Pity
8. Corruption
9. Journey

2016: Revive

On 31 October 2016, Revive was released by New Dream Records.

1. Win This Fight
2. Another Chance
3. Stay with Me Tonight
4. You Showed Me
5. Nothing at All
6. A Dream
7. Living Like I'm Dying
8. What I'm Gonna Do

2025: Con Man’s Chronicles

On 10 October 2025, The Skelters released their third album, titled Con Man’s Chronicles, through the record label Sleaszy Rider Records. The album includes the following tracks:

1. Legacy
2. Awesome
3. Lonely Rider
4. Falling Thunder
5. Down To Earth
6. Time To Trap
7. Begging For Reprice
8. That's Right
9. Pro Soul
10. A Never Ending Story
