= K.Bhta =

Kbhta
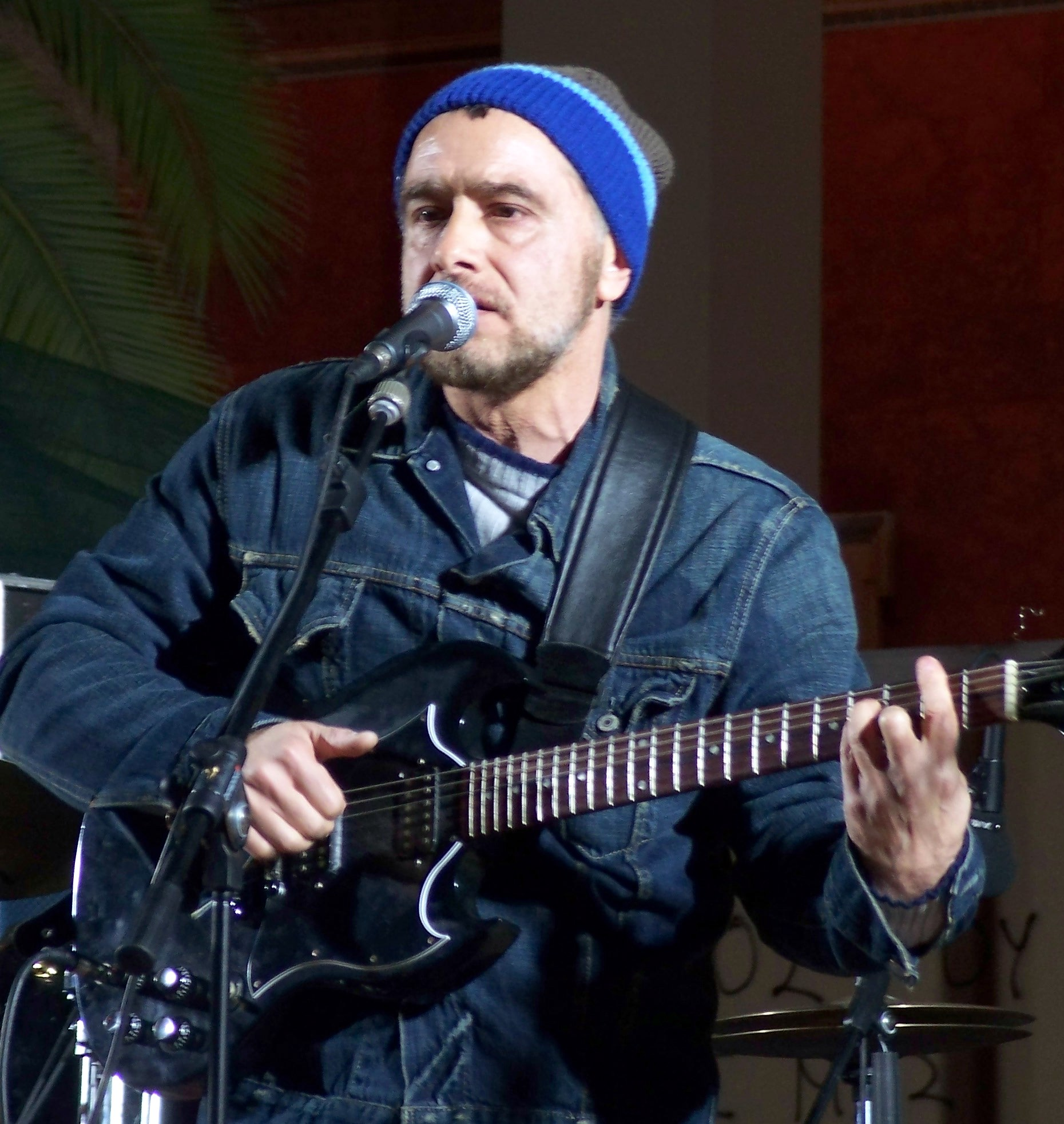
- Kbhta, 2008

Background information
- Also known as: Kbhta, Konstantinos Vita
- Born: Konstantinos Barbopoulos; 18 June 1961 (age 64); Melbourne, Australia
- Origin: Athens, Greece
- Genres: Ambient, trip hop, electronica
- Instruments: Guitar; Vocals
- Years active: 1992–present
- Labels: Wipe Out Records, FM Records, Tomorrow, Sony BMG, Olon music records, Planetworks Records, Legend Records, Sirius Music, Lyra Records
- Website: www.kbhta.gr

K.Bhta (abbreviated from the Greek: Κωνσταντίνος Βήτα, Konstantínos Vita; also known as Konstantinos Beta and Κ.Β.) is a Greek artist. He was born in Melbourne, Australia, where he studied painting and art history before moving to Athens, where he studied graphic design. In 1992 he formed the electronic band Stereo Nova, with which he recorded five official albums. In 1996, Stereo Nova disbanded and he began to pursue a solo career. He has composed music for documentaries, movies, and theatrical plays, and received international attention for his contribution to the Opening Ceremony of the Athens 2004 Olympic Games.

== Records ==
- a game (Ένα παιχνίδι) feat. Popi Asteriadi (FM Records) / 1998
- super stella (Planetworks/EMI) spring 1999
- angel baby (olon music) 2001/music from the play
- the child e.p (planetworks/Columbia) spring 2000
- meta feat. Dimitra Galani (Universal) / 2001
- gia sena me agapi (Eros music) 2002
- thita (Tomorrow recordings) spring 2002
- movement (Tomorrow recordings) May 2003
- transformations (Seirios) universal / July 2003
- agria xloh(Tomorrow recordings/Eros music) 2004 LP
- koma9205 (Tomorrow recordings/Eros music) 2005 DVD
- 2 (Legend) 2006 — The soundtrack for the play of the same name directed by Dimitris Papaioannou
- argos (Lyra Records) 2007
- enosi (Lyra Records) 2009
- Chryssalida (Inner Ear records) 2012
