= Mikro (Greek band) =

- Origin: Thessaloniki, Greece
- Genres: Electropop; Trip hop Drum 'n bass Easy Listening; Dance
- Years active: 1998 — present
- Label: Undo Records
- Members: Nikos Bitzenis (Nikonn); Chloe Ann; Yiannis Lefkaditis; 5irc
- Past members: Ria Mazine; Stelios Emmanuelidis
- Website: mikro official site

Mikro (Greek: Μίκρο) is a Greek electronic music band based in Thessaloniki, Greece. It was formed in 1998 and was named after the Greek word micro used in metric measuring systems. In their releases they initially used an all-caps Greek spelling of their name (ΜΙΚΡΟ), but in their latest releases ("Restart", "Download", "Upload") they have switched to a non all-caps spelling, transliterated to the Latin Alphabet (Mikro).

Mikro's lyrics are sung in both Greek and English.

== History ==
Bandleader Nikos Bitzenis cites influences such as Kraftwerk, Depeche Mode, Vangelis, OMD, the Human League and Yazoo. He and Yiannis Leucaditis began experimenting with electropop music in the late 1990s. Later, Panos Tolios (of the Greek band Xylina Spathia), George Costopoulos and Ria Mazine joined the group and their EP Stagones (Σταγόνες, Drops) was released in 1998. After the production of the single Aspri Sokolata (Άσπρη Σοκολάτα, White Chocolate), Panos Tolios and George Costopoulos left the group and Stelios Emmanuelidis joined.

== Solo works ==
Nikos Bitzenis' solo album was released in 2006 by the name Poladroid. Sunday, a single of Poladroid, was used in the 9th edition of Buddha Bar's compilation albums.

== Discography ==
- To Telos tou Kosmou (Το Τέλος Του Κόσμου, The End of the World) (1999)
- E-mail (Original soundtrack for the Greek movie of the same name) (2001)
- Tronik*plasma (Tronik*πλάσμα) (2003)
- Only the Best (Best of) (2004)
- 180 Mires (180 Μοίρες, 180 Degrees/Destinies) (2004)
- Restart (2007)
- Download (2009)
- Upload (2009)
- New (2014)
- Superiroes (Σουπερήρωες, Superheroes) (2024)

== Members ==
- Nikos Bitzenis (Nikonn) (programming, loops, synths, vocals)
- Chloe Ann (vocals, synths)
- Yiannis Lefkaditis (John-John; guitar)
- 5irc (drums, loops, Vpads)
