= Stereo Nova =

Greek electronic music band

- Origin: Greece
- Genres: Techno, ambient, trip hop
- Years active: 1992–1997, 2008, 2018-
- Labels: Wipe Out Records, FM Records, Tomorrow, Sony BMG
- Members: Kbhta; Michalis Delta
- Past members: Antonis Pi

Stereo Nova (Greek: Στέρεο Νόβα) is a Greek electronic music band, whose main output was in the 1990s. Widely thought of as a pioneer band in the nascent electronic genre in Greece, they were also voted as the best Greek band for the year 1994 according to MTV Europe.

== History ==
Stereo Nova was formed in the early 1990s by Kbhta, Michalis Delta. Their first name was Bobby Blast. They changed their name to "Stereo Nova" for the release of their self titled debut. They were later joined by a third member, Antonis Pi, who left the group after the release of "Telson".

StereoNova recorded five albums (StereoNova, Discolata, Asyrmatos Kosmos, Telson, Vitamina Tek), while, soon after their disbanding another disc was released –co-produced with Stamatis Kraounakis (Ofelimo Fortio) and another (studio processed live performances disc) titled S.K.A.Z.I. (Skorpia Kommatia Apo Zontanes Ihografisis – Scattered Tracks From Live Recordings).

On 5 December 2008, 11 years after their disbandment, the band reunited for a performance at a party held by popular Athenian weekly LIFO - "a gift to our old fans and our new friends" as Kbhta stated.

== Musical style ==
Stereo Nova are widely recognized as dance and electronic music pioneers in Greece. Their music blends a wide array of urban and electronic influences. Their poetic and socially conscious lyrics are delivered through a mix of rapping and recital.

== Discography ==
=== Albums ===
- 1992 Στέρεο Νόβα - Stereo Nova (Wipe Out)
- 1993 Ντισκολάτα - Discolata (FM Records)
- 1994 Ασύρματος κόσμος - Asirmatos kosmos (Wireless world) (FM Records)
- 1995 The drone compilation - (FM Records)
- 1996 Τέλσον – Telson (FM Records)
- 1997 Βιταμίνα τεκ – Vitamina Tek (FM Records)
- 1998 Ωφέλιμο φορτίο - Ofelimo fortio (Payload), co-produced with Stamatis Kraounakis (FM Records)
- 1999 Σκάζη (live) - Skazi (Scattered Tracks From Live Recording) (FM Records)
- 2000 Μπεστ οφ - Best of (FM Records)
- 2003 Στέρεο Νόβα (reissue) - (Tomorrow)
- 2008 Βικτώρια (best of) - Victoria (Sony BMG)
- 2018 Ουρανός - Ouranos (Inner Ear Records)

=== Singles and EPs ===
- 1993 Το παζλ στον αέρα - To pazl ston aera (The puzzle in the air) (FM Records)
- 1994 New life 705 - (FM Records)
- 1994 Τέκνο (Μόμπιλ) - Techno (Mobil) (FM Records)
- 1995 Λιγότερο από αυτό - Ligotero apo afto (Less than this) (FM Records)
- 1996 Μάθημα – Mathima (Lesson) (FM Records)
- 1997 Ταξίδι στη γη – Taksidi sti gi (Trip to earth)(FM Records)
- 1998 Νόχι - Nohi (FM Records)

=== Participations ===
- 1995 Act Up-Εν τούτω νίκα - Act up-En toutō nika (Act up-In hoc signo vinces) (FM Records)

== See also ==
- Kbhta
- Mikael Delta
