= Fotis Polymeris =

- Fotios Palymeris
- Born: 20 February 1920; Patras, Greece
- Died: 28 May 2013; Athens, Greece
- Occupation(s): Guitarist, singer, composer
- Spouse: Maria Palimeri
- Children: Fani Polymeri, Evangelia Palimeri
- Musical career
- Instrument: Vocals

Fotis Polymeris (Greek: Φώτης Πολυμέρης; 20 February 1920 – 28 May 2013), born as Fotios Palymeris (Φώτιος Παλημέρης), was a Greek guitarist, singer and composer.

He is considered amongst the most successful representatives of the "early popular" Greek songs with a personal trobadour-style. He wrote lyrics and music for over 100 songs and collaborated with the most significant composers of this style. Also, Polymeris' music is heard in several Greek films.

Later he co-worked also with people from rebetiko-style music, such as Vassilis Tsitsanis.
