= Theophrastos Sakellaridis =

Greek composer

- Born: September 7, 1883; Athens, Kingdom of Greece
- Died: January 2, 1950 (aged 66); Athens, Kingdom of Greece
- Occupation(s): Composer, conductor

Theophrastos Sakellaridis (Greek: Θεόφραστος Σακελλαρίδης; 7 September 1883 – 2 January 1950), was a Greek composer, conductor, and basic creator of Greek operetta.

== Biography ==
Sakellaridis was born in Athens on 7 September 1883. His mother came from Hydra and his father from Litochoro.

He took his first courses of music by his father, Ioannis Sakellaridis. He studied in Athens, Germany, and Italy.

In 1903, Sakellaridis gave concerts with his own compositions in the Musical Academy of Munich, as well as in Italy and Egypt. He wrote about 80 operettas, many of them in his own libretto, five operas, various songs and music for revues. Sakellaridis died in Athens on 2 January 1950.

== "The Godson" ==
The operetta "The Godson" (Greek Ο Βαφτιστικός, O Vaftistikos) remains Sakellaridis' most popular work and is regularly performed to this day. It is a comedy of errors done in the classic manner of the French boulevard. It is set in the Balkan Wars. Athens is basking in the news of successive victories of the Greek armies, but Vivika Zacharouli is furious. Her husband has been drafted, but was able to secure a safe auxiliary post in Athens, and is not actually winning any battle glory at all. Her only consolation is her godson, Marko, (the story's McGuffin) whom she had christened when he was a baby and never seen again since. He is a real war hero, because he regularly writes her from the front and recounts his numerous fighting accomplishments. Then Marko appears all of a sudden, on leave from the front to finally meet his godmother. She is ecstatic; her husband not so much. He is not really Marko, though. He is Peter Charmides, who was serving with poor illiterate Marko and was reading and writing his correspondence for him. Marko is actually an army cook: the only fire he has faced is the one under his pots and pans, and all his supposed battle laurels have been faked by the scheming Charmides, who not only has his eyes upon Vivika, but has also decided to impersonate his colleague and woo this charming grand lady. What he does not know is that his own wife, Kiki, is Vivika's old friend from school, and she is on her way there to ask a favor: Vivika's uncle is a colonel, and maybe he could secure a few days' leave for her husband? The Colonel arrives soon as well: he is enamoured by Kiki because they travelled together on the train, and he is determined to have her once he finds out she is his niece's house guest. In the meantime Charmides-"Marko" is very actively pursuing his "godmother"'s favors, and she is willing to be persuaded. It is not every day that a lady is being courted by a young, dashing, bona fide war hero. The Colonel walks in on them, and she has to present her godson lover as her husband, and then her real husband as her godson. As soon as the Colonel is fooled, he is confronted by Kiki, who coyly demands that leave for her husband in return for her favors. He readily agrees and they join the others to announce the news, except now everything is exposed: the supposed husband is not the godson either, he is Kiki's husband, and the supposed godson is Vivika's husband: the two ladies have no other way out of the mess but fainting. The Colonel is not shaken at all by all this commotion: the reason he is there is to announce to Zacharoulis that he has arranged a post at the front for him. He can now win all the glory that has eluded him so far. Now it is Zacharoulis' turn to faint.

== Compositions (selection) ==
=== Opera ===
- Hymenaios (1903)
- The pirate (1907)
- Perouzé (Περουζέ) (1911)

=== Operetta ===
- "Picnic" (Πικ-Νικ) (1915)
- "Sleepwalker" (Υπνοβάτης) (1917)
- "Ο Vaftistikos" (Ο Βαφτιστικός, The Godson or The Baptismal) (1918), probably the most famous Greek operetta.
- "The Harlequin" (Ο Αρλεκίνος) (1919)
- "Thelo na do ton papa" (Θέλω να ιδώ τον Πάπα, I want to see the pope) (1920)
- "Sweet Nana" (Γλυκειά Νανά) (1921)
- "The Daughter of the Storm" (Η κόρη της καταιγίδος) (1923)
- "Rozita" (Ροζίτα) (1925)
- "Halima" (Χαλιμά) (1926)
- "Enas kleftis ston paradeiso" (Ένας κλέφτης στον παράδεισο, A thief in Paradise) (1926)
- "Hero and Leandros" (Ηρώ και Λέανδρος) (1927)
- "Christina" (Χριστίνα) (1928)
- "Beba" (Μπέμπα) (1928)
- "Sataneri" (Σατανερί) (1930)
- "Modern Girls" (Μοντέρνα Κορίτσια) (1935)
- "Stachtopouta" (Σταχτοπούτα) (1938)
- "The Typist"" (Η Δακτυλογράφος) (1939)

== Sources ==
- Takis Kalogeropoulos: Θεόφραστος Σακελλαρίδης, Lexiko tis Ellinikis mousikis, Athens 1998–99 (online on wiki.musicportal.gr)
