= Corfiot Italians =

Ethnic group on the Greek island

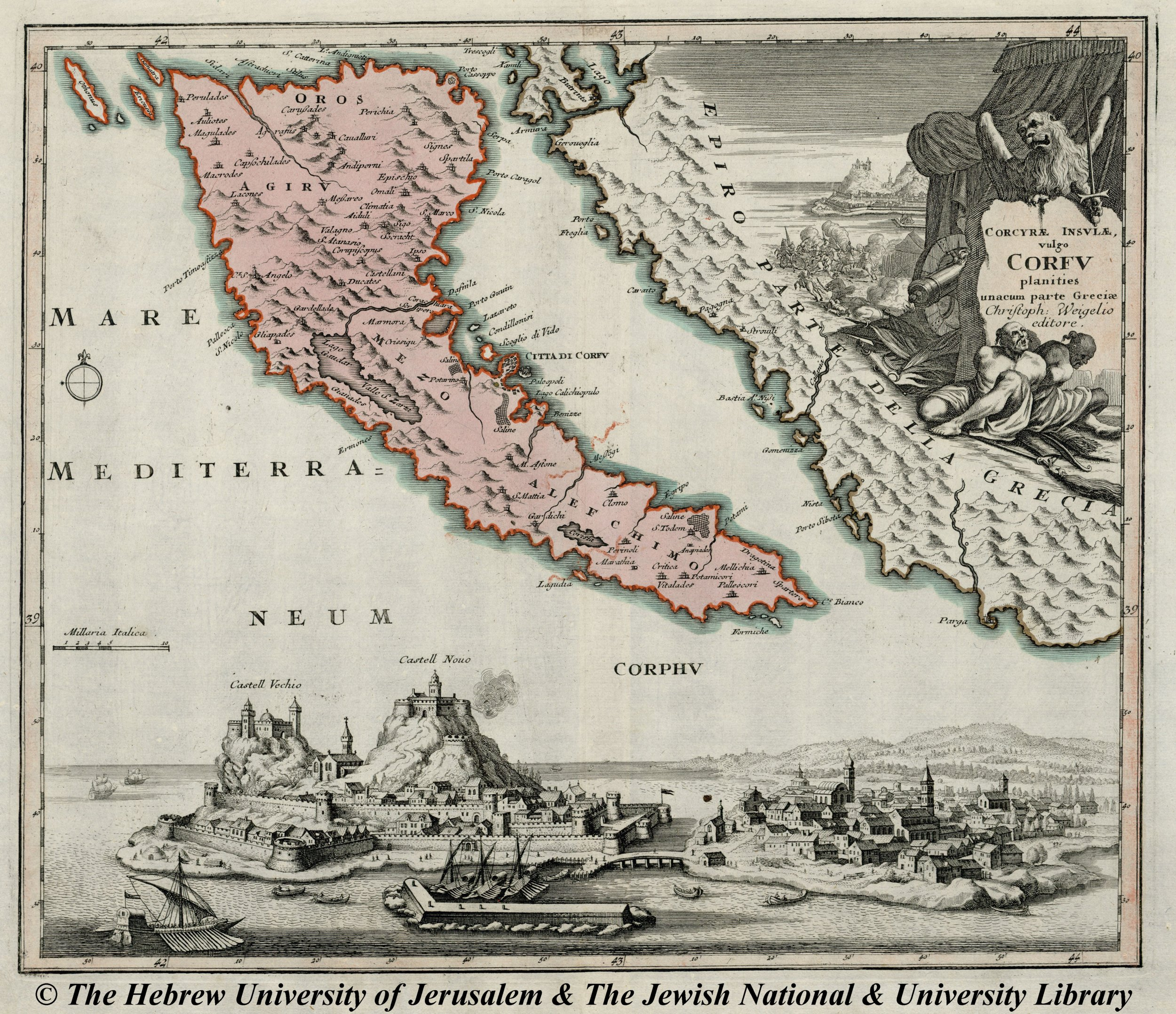
Map of Venetian Corfu by Christoph Weigel in 1720

Corfiot Italians are a population from the Greek island of Corfu (Kerkyra) with ethnic and linguistic ties to the Republic of Venice. Their name was specifically established by Niccolò Tommaseo during the Italian Risorgimento. During the first half of the 20th century, Mussolini (whose fascist regime promoted the ideals of Italian irredentism) successfully used the Corfiot Italians as a pretext to occupy Corfu twice.

== Origins ==
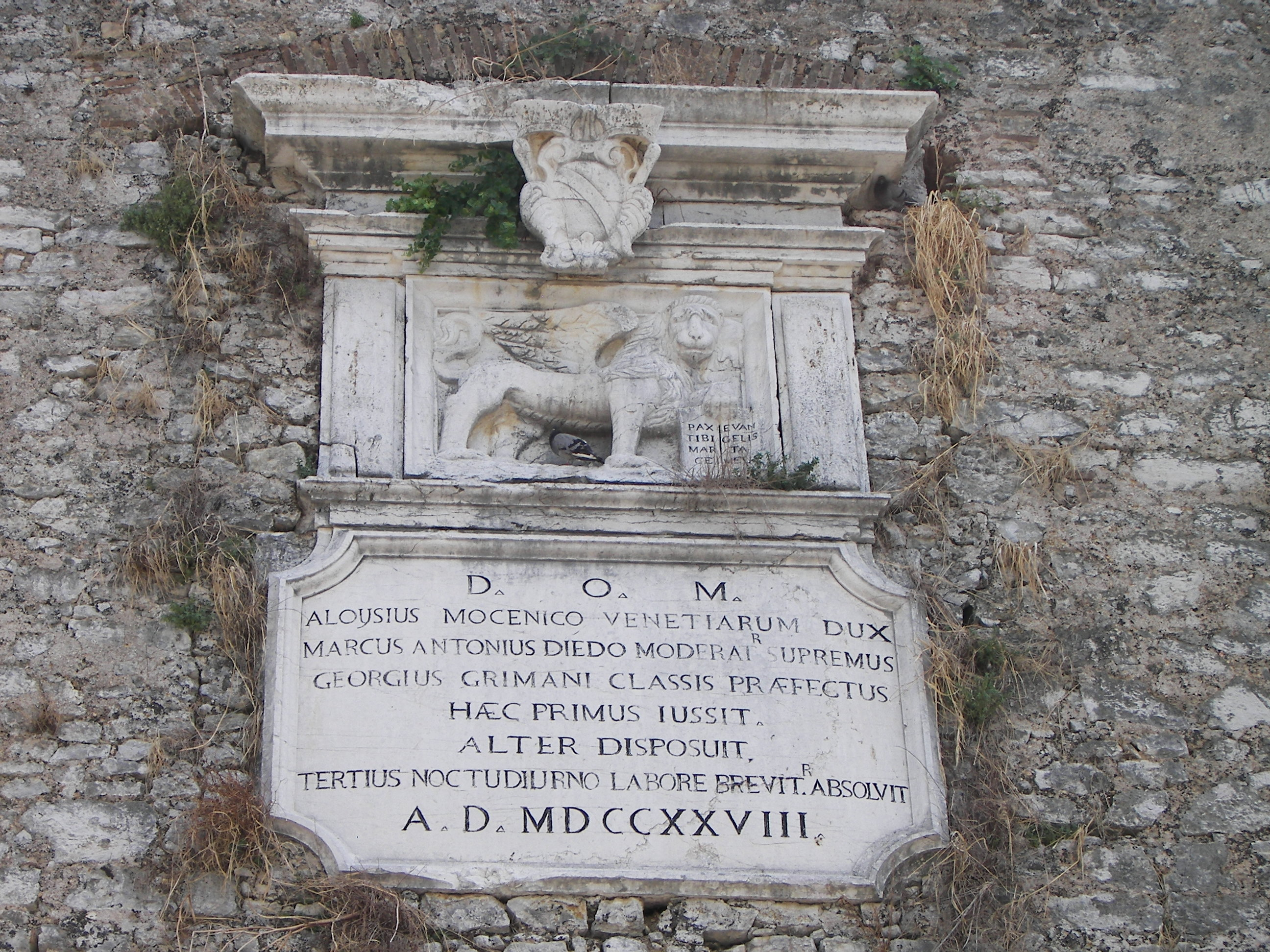
Venetian blazon with the Lion of Saint Mark, as frequently found on the New Fortress walls

The origins of the Corfiot Italian community can be found in the expansion of the Italian States toward the Balkans during and after the Crusades. In the 12th century, the Kingdom of Naples sent some Italian families to Corfu to rule the island. From the Fourth Crusade of 1204 onwards, the Republic of Venice sent many Italian families to Corfu. These families brought the Italian language of the Middle Ages to the island.

When Venice ruled Corfu and the Ionian Islands, which lasted during the Renaissance and until the late 18th century, most of the Corfiote upper classes spoke Italian (or specifically Venetian in many cases), but the mass of people remained Greek ethnically, linguistically, and religiously before and after the Ottoman sieges of the 16th century.

Corfiot Italians were mainly concentrated in the city of Corfu, which was called "Città di Corfu" by the Venetians. More than half of the population of Corfu city in the 18th century spoke the Venetian language. The blend of Italian and Greek, originally known as the Dialetto Corcirese and comprising archaic Venetian with Greek syntax ultimately led to the Corfiot dialect of Greek known locally as Corfiatica.

The re-emergence of Greek nationalism, after the Napoleonic era, contributed to the gradual disappearance of the Corfiot Italians. Corfu was ultimately incorporated into the Kingdom of Greece in 1864. The Greek government abolished all Italian schools in the Ionian islands in 1870, and as a consequence, by the 1940s there were only fourteen hundred Corfiote Italians left.

== Venetian heritage ==
The Republic of Venice dominated Corfu for nearly five centuries until 1797. Although assailed several times by Ottoman naval and land forces and subjected to four notable sieges in 1537, 1571, 1573 and 1716, in which the great natural strength of the city and its defenders asserted itself time after time. The effectiveness of the powerful Venetian fortifications of the island was a great factor that enabled Corfu to remain the last bastion of free, uninterrupted Greek and Christian civilization in the southern Balkans after the fall of Constantinople. Will Durant, an American historian, claims that Corfu owed to the Republic of Venice the fact that it was the only part of Greece never conquered by the Muslim Turks. The Ottomans occupied briefly some of the other Ionian islands, but were unsuccessful with their four sieges of Corfu. This fact gave Corfu and Malta the title of "Bastions of Christian Europe" during the late Renaissance.

=== Language ===
During these centuries, many Venetians moved to the island. Because of its association with the ruling elite, by the end of the 15th century, the influence of the Italian language and culture (including in some ways the Roman Catholic church) assumed a predominant role in the island. Until the second half of the 20th century the Veneto da mar was spoken in Corfu, and the local Greek language assimilated a large number of Italian and Venetian words, many of which are still common today. Indeed, even before the fall of the Byzantine Empire much of the population in Corfu spoke the Veneto da mar or the Mediterranean Lingua Franca Sabir as a second, or first, language.

"Corfu had also a demographic problem because of the constant Turkish invasions. Venice declared an invitation to everyone who wanted to move and live in Corfu. Cretans, Peloponnesians, people from Epirus and many Venetians were moved to Corfu. Pieces of land were given to Venetians in order to stay on the island permanently."

Corfu passed as a dowry from the Greek Despot of Epirus to Manfred of Sicily in 1259, and was not ruled by Greeks again until the 19th century. It became Venetian in 1386 although, with the exception of Corfu city which maintained a majority of a Venetian-speaking population (due partially to the Italkian of the capital's Jewish community), most of the peasants retained Greek as their first language.

According to historian Ezio Gray, the small communities of Venetian-speaking people in Corfu were mostly assimilated after the island became part of Greece in 1864 and especially after all Italian schools were closed in 1870. However, the Italian language maintained some importance, as can be seen by the fact that poets like Stefano Martzokis (Marzocchi was the surname of the father, an Italian from Emilia-Romagna) and Gerasimos Markoras, the first from Corfù and the second from Cefalonia, wrote some of their poems in Italian during the second half of the 19th century.

=== Culture and learning ===
Venetian rule significantly influenced many aspects of the island's culture. The Venetian feudal families pursued a mild but somewhat assimilating policy towards the natives, who began to adopt many aspects of Venetian customs and culture. The Corfiotes were encouraged to enrich themselves by the cultivation of the olive, but were debarred from entering into commercial competition with Venice. The island served even as a refuge for Greek scholars, and in 1732 became the home of the first Academy of modern Greece. The first newspaper of Corfu was in Italian: the official weekly newspaper (Gazzetta degli Stati Uniti delle Isole Jone) was first published in 1814. First in Italian, then in both Greek and Italian, finally from 1850 in Greek and English; and it continued for the entire duration of the English Protectorate until 1864. Many Italian Jews took refuge in Corfu during the Venetian period and spoke their own language, a mixture of Hebrew and Venetian with some Greek words.

Venetian influence was also important in the development of the opera in Corfu. During Venetian rule, the Corfiotes developed a fervent appreciation of Italian opera, and many local composers, such as the Corfiot Italians Antonio Liberali and Domenico Padovani developed their career with the theatre of Corfu, called Teatro di San Giacomo.

Corfu's cuisine also maintains some Venetian delicacies, cooked with local spicy recipes. Dishes include "Pastitsada" (the most popular dish in the island of Corfu, that comes from the Venetian dish Spezzatino), "Strapatsada", "Sofrito", "Savoro", "Bianco" and "Mandolato". Some traditions in Corfu were introduced by the Venetians such as the Carnival (Ta Karnavalia).

=== Architecture ===
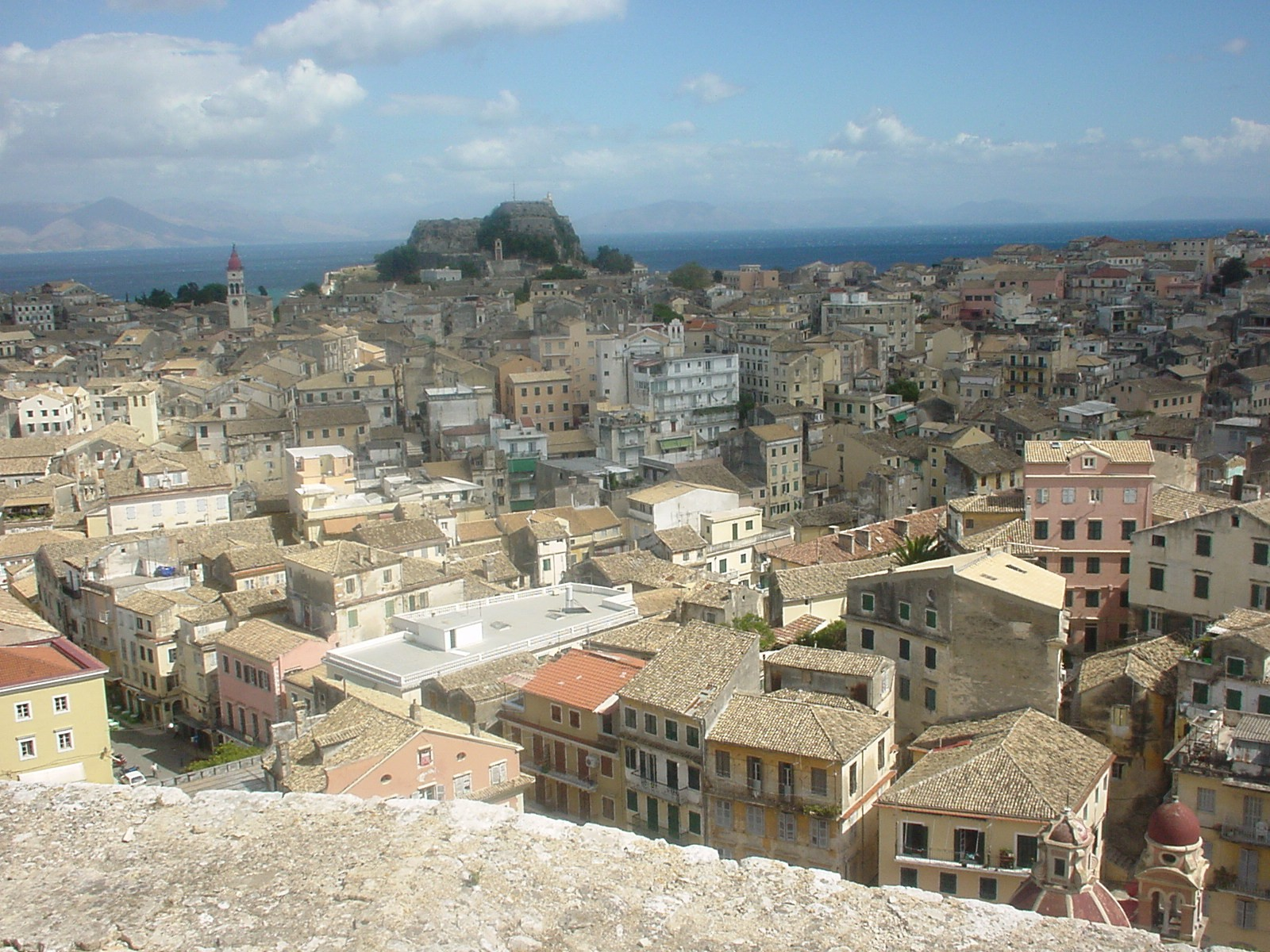
View over Corfu City from the New Fortress, with the Old Fortress visible in the background.

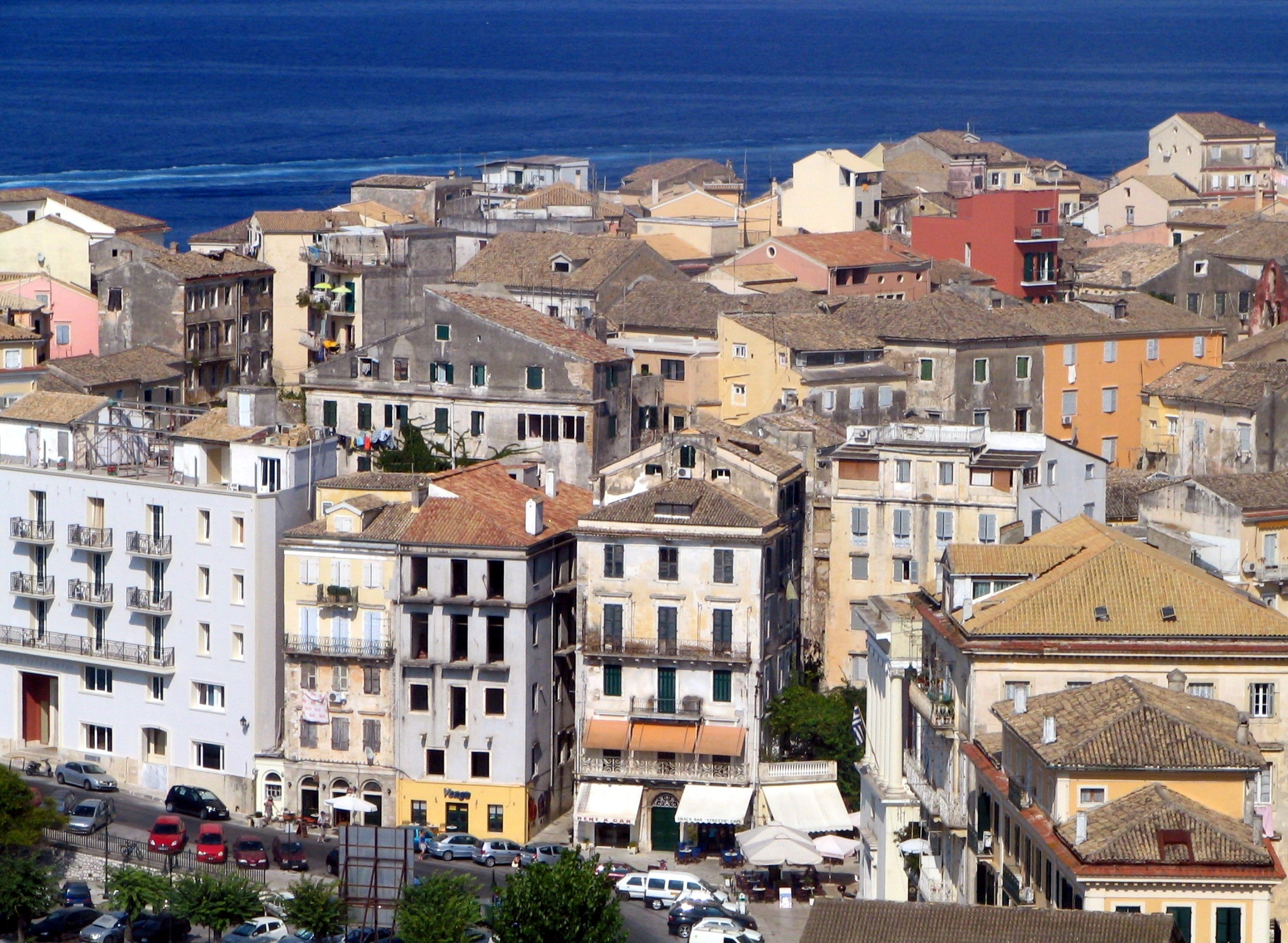
View of the Venetian quarter

The architecture of Corfu City still reflects its long Venetian heritage, with its multi-storied buildings, its spacious squares such as the popular "Spianada" and the narrow cobblestone alleys known as "Kantounia". The town began to grow during the Venetian period on a low hillock situated between the two forts. In many respects, Corfu typifies the small Venetian town, or borgo, of which there are numerous other surviving examples in the former Venetian territories of the Adriatic Sea, such as Ragusa and Spalato in Dalmatia. As in Venice itself, the "campi" developed haphazardly in the urban fabric where it was natural for residents to congregate, especially around churches, civic buildings, fountains, and cisterns. The best example of such a space is Plateia Dimarcheiou ("Town Hall Square"), overlooked on its north side by the 17th century Loggia dei Nobili (which today serves as the seat of the local government) and on the east side by the late sixteenth century Catholic Church of St. Iakovos, or St. James. The Italian Renaissance is best represented on Corfu by the surviving structures of the Fortezza Vecchia (the Old Fortress) on the eastern side of the town, built by the Veronese military engineer Michele Sanmicheli and the Venetian Ferrante Vitelli, who also designed the later fortress on the west, the Fortezza Nuova.

Venetians promoted the Catholic Church during their four centuries of rule in Corfu. Today, the majority of Corfiots are Greek Orthodox Christians (following the official religion of Greece). However, there is still a percentage of Catholics (5% or c. 4,000 people) who owe their faith to their Venetian origins. These contemporary Catholics are mostly families who came from Malta (about two thirds), but also from Italy during Venetian rule. The Catholic community almost exclusively resides in the Venetian "Citadel" of Corfu City, living harmoniously alongside the Orthodox community.

==== Teatro di San Giacomo ====
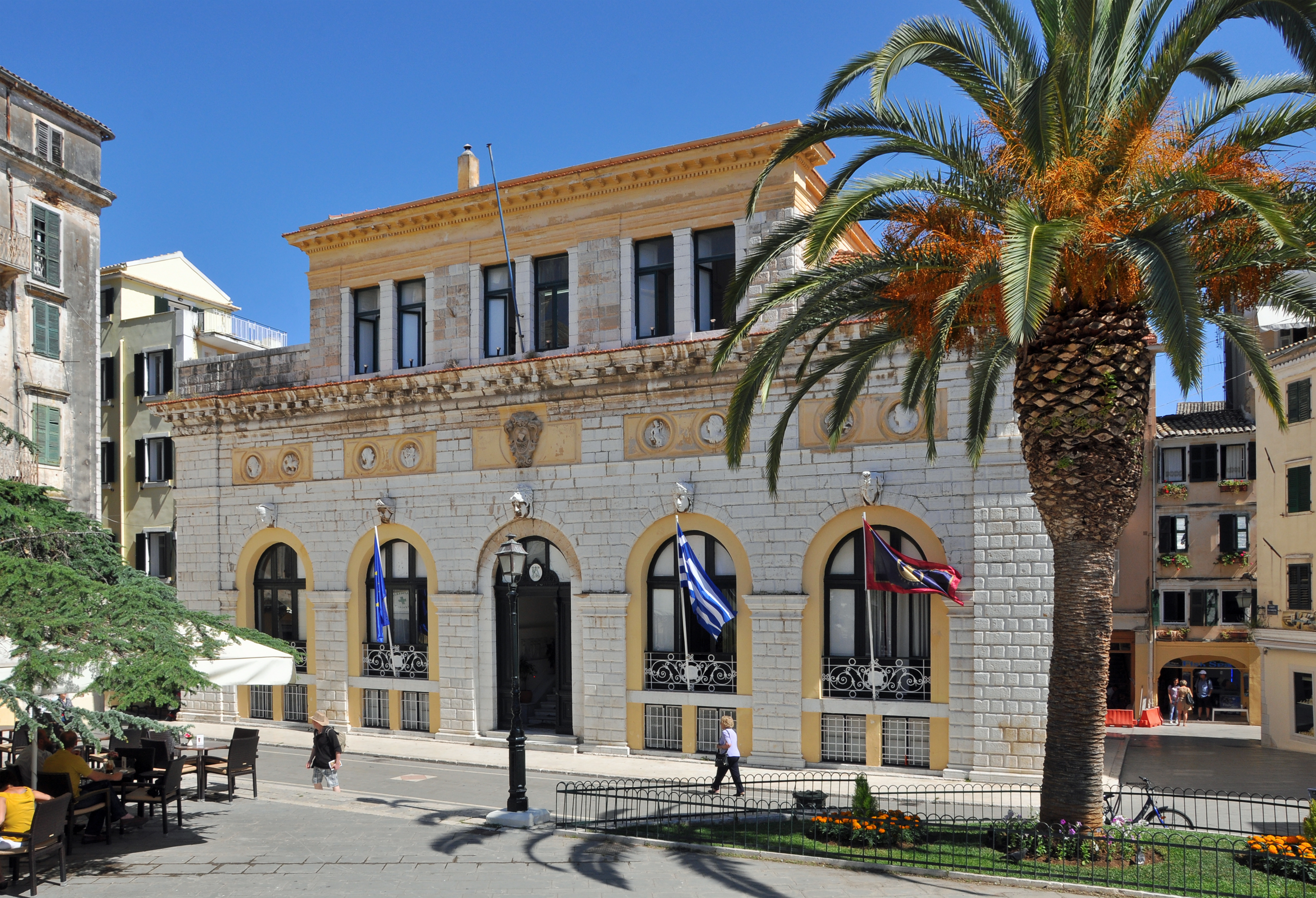
Nobile Teatro di San Giacomo di Corfù (now Corfu City Hall)

During Venetian rule, the Corfiotes developed a fervent appreciation of Italian opera, which was the real source of the extraordinary (given conditions in the mainland of Greece) musical development of the island during that era. The opera house of Corfu during 18th and 19th centuries was that of the Nobile Teatro di San Giacomo, named after the neighbouring Catholic cathedral, but the theatre was later converted into the Town Hall. A long series of local composers, such as Antonio Liberali (a son of an Italian bandmaster of the British Army, who later translated his surname to 'Eleftheriadis'), Domenico Padovani (whose family has been in Corfu since the 16th century) or Spyridon Xyndas contributed to the fame of the Teatro di San Giacomo.

The first opera to be performed in the San Giacomo Theatre had been as far back as 1733 ("Gerone, tiranno di Siracusa"), and for almost two hundred years between 1771 until 1943 nearly every major operatic composition from the Italian tradition, as well as many others of Greek and French composers, were performed at the stage of the San Giacomo theatre. This impressive tradition, invoking an exceptional musical past, continues to be reflected in the mythology supporting the opera theatre of Corfu, reputed to be fixture on famous opera singers' working travel itineraries. Operatic performers who found success at the theatre were distinguished with the accolade applaudito in Corfu ("applauded in Corfu") as a tribute to the discriminating musical sensibility of the island's audience. The opera house and its historical archives were destroyed during a German Luftwaffe bombing raid in 1943.

== Corfiot Italians and the Risorgimento ==
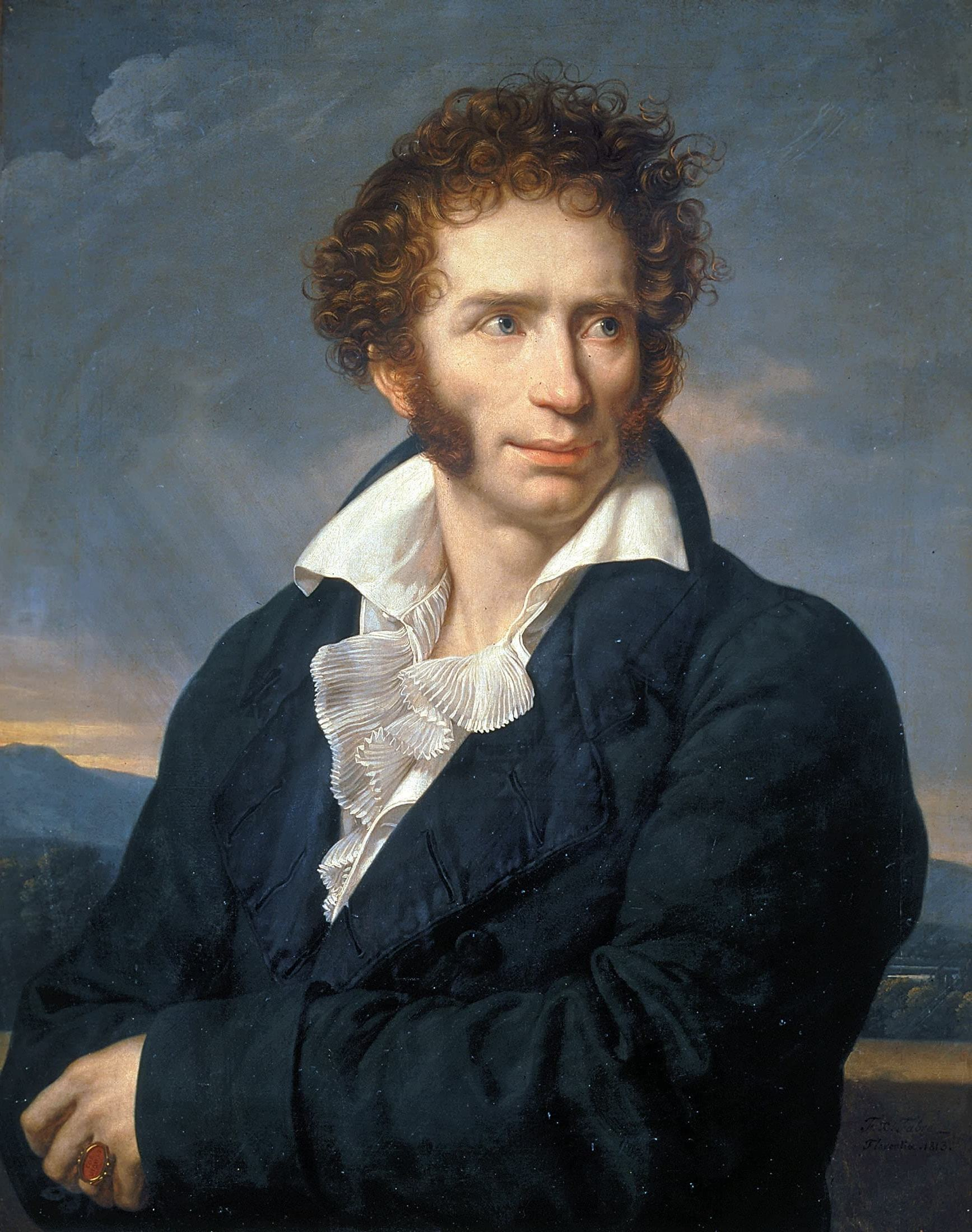
Ugo Foscolo, hero of the Italian Risorgimento, was born in Zante and briefly lived in Corfu.

The Italian Risorgimento was initially concentrated in the Italian peninsula with the surrounding continental areas (Istria, Dalmatia, Corsica, Nizzardo, etc.) and did not reach Corfu and the Ionian islands. One of the main heroes of the Italian Risorgimento, the poet Ugo Foscolo, was born in Zante from a noble Venetian family of the island, but only superficially promoted the possible unification of the Ionian islands to Italy.

The first newspaper of Corfu was in Italian: the official weekly newspaper (Gazzetta degli Stati Uniti delle Isole Jonie) was first published in 1814. First in Italian, then in both Greek and Italian, finally from 1850 in Greek and English; and it continued for the entire duration of the British protectorate until 1864.

According to historian Ezio Gray, the small communities of Venetian-speaking people in Corfu were mostly assimilated after the island became part of Greece in 1864 and especially after all Italian schools were closed in 1870.

However, the Italian language maintained some importance, as can be seen by the fact that poets like Stefano Martzokis (Marzocchi was the surname of the father, an Italian from Emilia-Romagna) and Geranimos Markonos, the first from Corfù and the second from Cefalonia, wrote some of their poems in the second half of the 19th century in Italian.

The island of Corfu was a refuge for many Italians in exile during the Wars of Independence of Italy, like Niccolò Tommaseo (who married Diamante Pavello-Artale, a Corfiot Italian).

After World War I, however, the Kingdom of Italy started to apply a policy of expansionism toward the Adriatic area and saw Corfu as the gate of this sea. Benito Mussolini developed an extreme nationalistic position in accordance to the ideals of Italian irredentism and actively promoted the unification of Corfu to Italy.

The Corfiote Italians, even if reduced to a few hundreds in the 1930s, were strongly supported by fascist propaganda, and in the summer of 1941 (after the Italian occupation of the Ionian islands) Italian schools were reopened in Corfu city. During World War II, Mussolini promoted Italian irredentism in Corfu, similar to the one being promoted in Savoy.

== Italian occupations of Corfu ==
Italy occupied Corfu two times: the first for a few months only in 1923 after the assassination of Italian officers; the second during World War II, from April 1941 to September 1943.

=== Corfu Incident of 1923 ===
At the end of December 1915, Italy sent a military force to Corfu under the command of General Marro. They established post offices with the French occupation troops there. In 1915–1919, the Italian and French forces (as well as Serbian forces) remained on the island. The Italians did not have any intention of pulling out, but the British and the French government forced them to leave.

In 1923, the Italians tried to occupy Corfu again, but, on the morning of 27 August 1923, unknown persons murdered General Enrico Tellini and three officers of the Italian border commission on the Greek–Albanian border.

Italy made an announcement asking within 24 hours the following demands: an official apology of the Greek government; the commemoration of the dead in the Catholic Church of Athens, with all the members of the Greek government to participate; the rendering of honors to the Italian flag and the Italian naval squadron anchored in Faliro; an investigation of the Greek authorities, with the participation of the Italian officer Perone di San Martino, which should end within 5 days; the death penalty for those found guilty; the payment of 50 million Italian lire within 5 days by the Greek government as indemnity; and finally, that the dead should be honored with military honors in Preveza.

The Greek government responded accepting only the first three and the last demands. Consequently, using this as a pretext, the Italian Army suddenly attacked Corfu on 31 August 1923. Commander Antony Foschini asked the prefect of Corfu to surrender the island. The prefect refused and he informed the government. Foschini warned him that the Italian forces would attack at 17:00 and the Corfiots refused to raise the white flag in the fortress. Seven thousand refugees, 300 orphans plus the military hospital were lodged in the Old Fortress, as well as the School of Police in the New Fortress. At 17:05 the Italians bombarded Corfu for 20 minutes. There were victims among the refugees of the old Fortress and the Prefect ordered the raising of the white flag. The Italians besieged the island and set the forces ashore. From the beginning of their possession, they started to inflict hard penalties on the people who had guns, and the officers declared that their possession was permanent. There were daily requisitions of houses and they censored the newspapers. Greece asked for the intervention of the League of Nations, of which both Greece and Italy were members, and demanded the solution of the problem through arbitration. The Italian government of Benito Mussolini refused, declaring that Corfu would remain occupied until the acceptance of the Italian terms. On 7 September 1923, the Conference of Ambassadors in Paris ended with Italian forces vacating Corfu, which finally began on 20 September 1923 and ended on the 27th of the same month.

=== World War II ===
After World War I, Italy had embarked on a policy of expansionism towards the Adriatic, in which Corfu played an important role, as it controlled entrance to it. As shown by the incident of 1923, Mussolini and Italian irredentism had set their sights firmly on the island. The Italian community was an especially useful tool, and it was both supported and exploited by Fascist propaganda.

During the Second World War Mussolini wanted to possess the Ionian Islands, which he succeeded with the help of the Germans during the Greco-Italian War. The Italians occupied Corfu from 28 March 1941. They implemented a process of Italianization, with creation of Italian schools, centered around the small surviving community of the Corfiote Italians, who still spoke the Venetian dialect, but which by that time numbered only 500 people, living mainly in Corfu city.

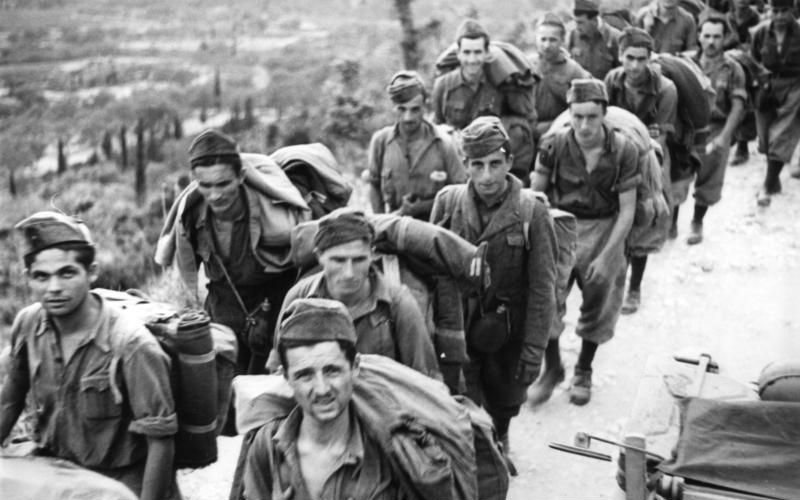
Italian soldiers taken prisoner by the Germans in Corfu, September 1943

The first reaction to the Italian occupation happened on the first Sunday of November 1941. During the procession of the Saint Spyridon, the fascist young Corfiot Italians participated and provoked the students of the Greek high schools. When the procession arrived in the Upper Square, the students started to leave whilst singing the national Greek songs. The "Carbinaria" and the "Finetsia" fascist groups attacked and arrested many Greek students, beating them and exiling some of them to the island of Othonous. After that episode there was a relative calm in Corfu until the surrender of Italy on 9 September 1943.

From 10 to 14 September 1943, the Germans tried to force the Italian garrison in Corfu to surrender, while the political prisoners from the small island of Lazaretto were set free. Finally, on the morning of 13 September, Corfiots woke up to the disasters of the war, as the Germans attacked the island. The German air raids continued the whole day bombarding the port, the Fortresses and strategic points. During the night of 14 September, huge damages were inflicted to the Jewish quarters of Saint Fathers and Saint Athanasios, the Court House, the Ionian Parliament, the Ionian Academy, in which the Library was lodged, the Schools of Middle Education, the Hotel "Bella Venezia", the Customs Office, the Manor-Houses and the Theatre. Finally the next week the Germans occupied the island with huge losses among the Italians, and subsequently deported the nearly 5,000 Jews (speakers of the Italkian) of the island to concentration camps, where most of them perished.

Currently, the Venetian language is no longer spoken in Corfu as its last speakers died in the 1980s. Moreover, there are only a few Jews in Corfu city who still speak Italkian, a Jewish language mixed with many Venetian words.

== Italian with Venetian/Apulian influences ==
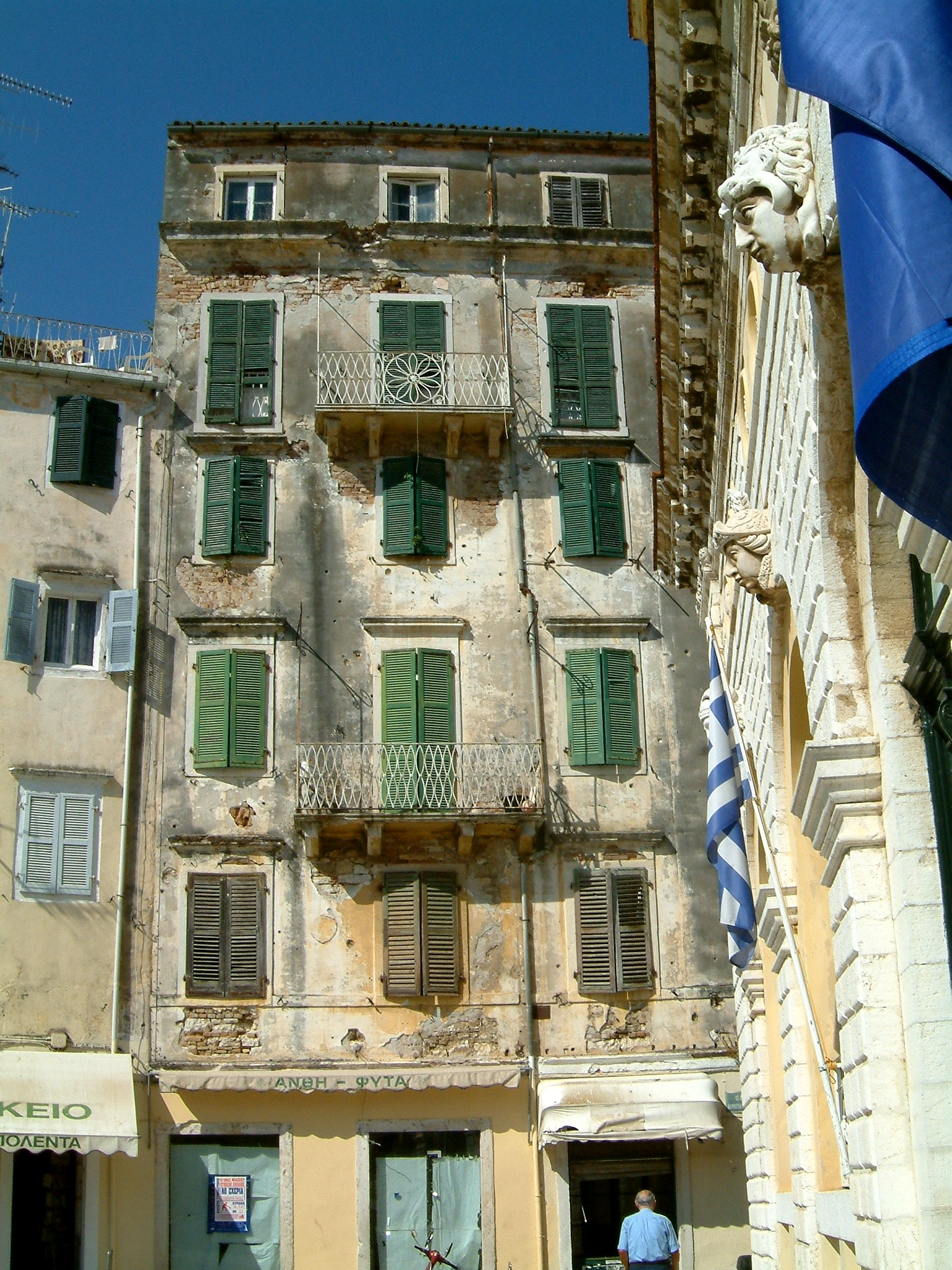
Old Venetian-style buildings of downtown Corfu city.

Historically, the upper class of the Jewish community of Corfu spoke a Venetian dialect with some modifications (due to the influence of Greek) (see "Italkian").

The Venetian of the Corfiote Jews accordingly differed from the same Venetian dialect as spoken by non-Jews in the same town. A characteristic of this dialect is the formation in "ò" of the plural of nouns ending in "à", a formation which originated in the Hebrew ending, simplified, according to the Italian laws of phonology, into "ò", e.g., the Italianized plural of "berakah" is "berakhò" (for "berakot"); hence "novità", "novitò"; "città", "cittò." There has presumably been no Jewish literature in this dialect, since Venice herself very early adopted pure Italian as her official language, and all documents of the Corfu Jewish community were written in that language, which served as well in Hebrew schools as the means of translating the Bible.

Permanent residence in Corfu was also found by the Apulian Jews, who brought from the Italian coast their vernacular and a few specimens, still preserved, of their literature. The dialect from Apulia was accordingly spoken by the under class of the Jewish community. Two Apulian love-songs, seemingly original, exist in manuscript, of which one is an independent composition of a rather scurrilous purport, while in the second each stanza is preceded by one of a religious Hebrew poem on a quite different subject. Both are written in Hebrew characters, as is a semi-original composition containing the rules for the Passover supper, of which the following paragraph (with Italian words retransliterated) may be cited:

"Pigiamu la cu li doi signali, e la spartimu a menzu, edizzimu: Comu spartimu chista, cussi spardiu lu Mari Ruviu, e passàra li padri nostri intra di issu e fizzi cun issi e . Cussì cu fazza cu nùi; chistu annu accà, l'annu che veni à la terra di omini liberi.—Menza mintimu sotto la tovaggia pir, e l'altva menza infra li doi, pir cu farrimu."

The simple past tense ("vitti", "vidisti", "vitti") was the only one in use among the Apulian Jews, who agreed in this respect with the Apulians of the Italian coast; they differed from the latter, however, in forming the future, which is expressed by means of the auxiliary "anzu" (= "I have"), as on the Continent, and a following infinitive, which is always, as in modern Greek, resolved. Such resolution occurs quite frequently in the area of Bari (with the particles "mu" or "mi"), but not as regularly as in Corfu, where with the exception of the substantivized forms "lu manzari", "lu mbiviri", and a few others, the unresolved infinitive is absolutely unknown. So to-day "dirò", "aggiu diri" and "aggiu mu dicu" occur on the Continent, but only "anzu cu dicu", in Corfu.

This dialect has brought all borrowed words under its own laws of accidence; but its original vocabulary has been hopelessly impoverished and deprived of its finest elements. A Corfiote Jew visiting any part of Apulia would have found difficulty in understanding the spoken vernacular or the songs of the natives, although the grammatical structure is exactly the same as that of his own dialect.

The Jews can boast of having preserved the oldest text in the Apulian dialect, a collection of translations of Hebrew dirges dating from the thirteenth century and now in the British Museum (MS. Or. 6276). It contains many obsolete terms which are very close to the Latin and many of the older and fuller grammatical forms. Among its points of interest are words and phrases such as "tamen sollicitatevi" (="mind"), "etiam Ribbi Ismahel", "lu coriu" (="skin"), "di la carni sua", "la ostia" (="army"), and "di li cieli." In the fourteenth century the decay of Apulian in Corfu had so far advanced that readers were no longer able to pronounce correctly the words of this Hebrew manuscript or to grasp their meanings. Vowel-points were accordingly inserted, but very inaccurately; and later an incompetent scribe incorrectly substituted "duzzini" (= "dozens"), "douzelli" (= "young men"), "macchina" (= "machine") for "magina" (= "image"), and attempted to erase the superlative termination of "grandissima." It was perhaps owing to the influence of the Venetian Veneto da mar that he spared all the simple futures; but in four or five places where the pronoun of the first person was erased the substituted words have so thoroughly obliterated the original readings that it is impossible to discover what was the old form of the peculiar "joni" which is now used side by side with "jò."

Today there are less than one hundred Corfiote Jews in the island of Corfu, subsequent to the Nazi deportations during World War II.

== Renowned Corfiot Italians ==
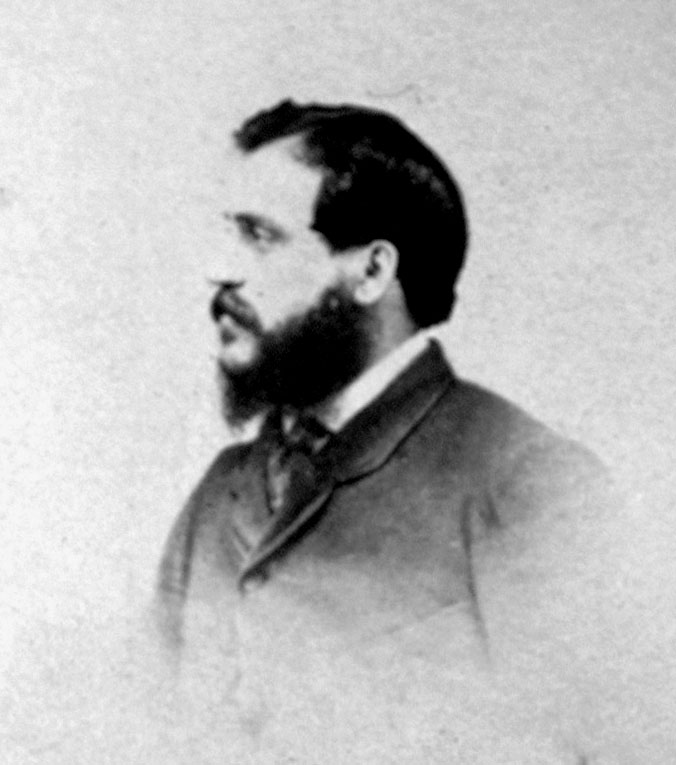
Felice Beato, Corfiot Italian photographer, in 1866

- Elena D'Angri, one of the most famous opera singers of the 19th century
- Felice Beato, photographer of the 19th century is thought to have spent his childhood in Corfu
- Antonios Liveralis, opera conductor and composer
- Georges Moustaki, singer-songwriter, was a son of Corfiot Italian Jews
- Domenico Padovani, opera conductor and composer
- Diamante Pavello-Artale, wife of Niccolò Tommaseo
- Ektoras Botrini (Ettore Botrini), chef and TV presenter

== See also ==
- History of the Jews in Apulia
- Nobile Teatro di San Giacomo di Corfù
- Corfiot Maltese

== Bibliography ==
- Antonicelli, Franco. Trent'anni di storia italiana, 1915–1945. Mondadori Editore. Torino, 1961.
- Durant, Will. The Renaissance. MJF Books. New York, 1981 ISBN 1-56731-016-8
- Fortis, Umberto and Zolli, Paolo. La parlata giudeo-veneziana. Assisi/Rome, 1979 ISBN 88-85027-07-5
- Gray, Ezio. Le terre nostre ritornano... Malta, Corsica, Nizza. De Agostini Editoriale. Novara, 1943
- Martin, John Jeffries. Venice Reconsidered. The History and Civilization of an Italian City-State, 1297–1797. Johns Hopkins UP. New York, 2002.
- Norwich, John Julius. A History of Venice. Vintage Books. New York, 1989.
- Price, Charles. Malta and the Maltese: a study in nineteenth century migration. Georgia House. Melbourne, 1954.
- Randi, O. Dalmazia etnica, incontri e fusioni. Tipografie venete. Venezia, 1990.
- Seton-Watson, Christopher. Italy from Liberalism to Fascism, 1870–1925. John Murray Publishers. London, 1967.
- Siebert, Diana: Aller Herren Außenposten. Korfu von 1797 bis 1944. Köln 2016, ISBN 978-3-00-052502-5
- Tagliavini, Carlo. Le origini delle lingue neolatine. Patron Ed. Bologna, 1982.
- Vignoli, Giulio. Gli Italiani Dimenticati. Minoranze Italiane In Europa. Saggi E Interventi. Editore Giuffrè. Roma, 2000.
