= Music of the Ionian Islands =

The music of the Ionian Islands is the music of the geographic and historical region of the Ionian Islands. Folk music of the Ionian Islands is largely based on the western European style. It is dominant the use of guitars and mandolins, while the kantadhes (romantic serenades from the Ionian Islands) are very popular. The island of Zakynthos has a diverse musical history with influences from Crete.

The Church music of the islands is also different from the rest of Greece's, with much western and Catholic influences on the Byzantine Rite. The region is also notable for the birth of the first school of modern Greek classical music (Heptanese or Ionian School, Greek: Επτανησιακή Σχολή), established in 1815. Some notable composers of the classical Ionian School are Nikolaos Mantzaros, Dionysios Lavrangas and Nikos Hatziapostolou.

Folk dances of the islands include:

- Ai Georgis
- Ballos
- Cerigotikos
- Diavaritikos
- Fourlana
- Kerkiraikos
- Syrtos

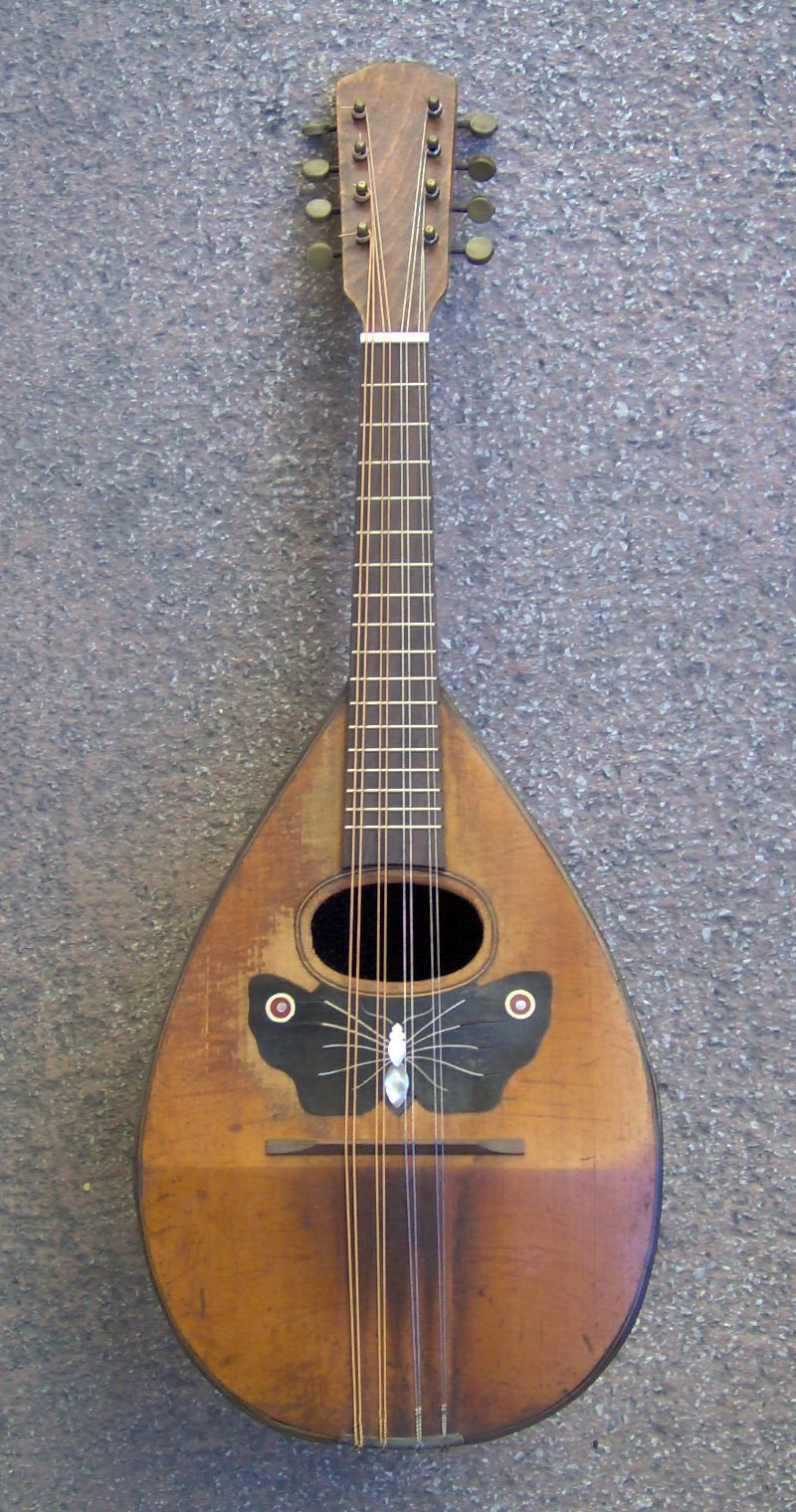
Mandolin, dominant instrument of Heptanesian music

== Notable artists ==
Composers:

- Fotis Aleporos
- Dionysios Apostolatos
- Dimitris Lagios
- Dionysios Lavrangas
- Spyros Markatos
- Nikos Hatziapostolou

Singers:

- Spyros and Makis Karaviotis

== See also ==
- Music of Greece
- Greek dances
- Greek folk music
- Ionian School (music)
