= Spyridon Xyndas =

Greek composer & guitarist (1812–1896)

- Σπυρίδων Ξύνδας
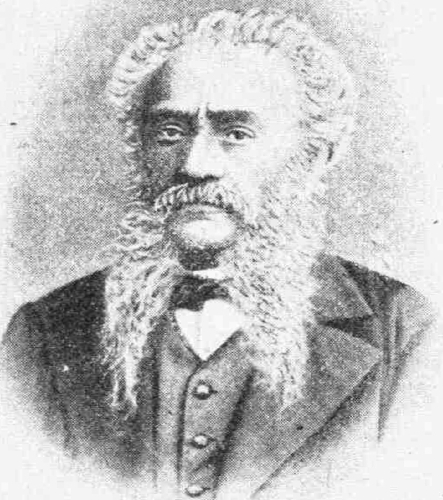
- Born: Spyridon Xyndas; June 8, 1812; Corfu, French ruled Ionian Islands
- Died: 25 November 1896 (aged 84); Athens, Greece
- Occupations: Composer, teacher

Spyridon Xyndas or Spiridone Xinda (Greek: Σπυρίδων Ξύνδας; June 8, 1812 – November 25, 1896) was a Greek composer and virtuoso guitarist. His last name has also been transliterated as "Xinta", "Xinda", "Xindas" and "Xyntas".

== Biography ==
Xyndas was born in Corfu in 1812. In 1823, he was a student of Nikolaos Mantzaros in music theory. After the completion of his studies in Corfu, he continued them in Naples and Milan under various teachers including Niccolò Antonio Zingarelli. In 1840, he and Antonios Liveralis (Antonio Liberali, one more student of Mantzaros) were the only professional musicians to participate in the founding of the Philharmonic Society of Corfu, an institute in which Xyndas was to teach for several years.

In the 1840s, Xyndas began to compose concert arias and songs in demotic Greek, a contribution that eventually resulted to the creation of the opera called O ypopsifios (The Parliamentary Candidate) in 1867. This was the first full-scale opera based on a libretto in Greek and the only one of Xyndas' operas that exists today. The libretto was written by Ioannis Rinopulos (with contributions by Nikolaos Makris and Xyndas himself) and it was performed at the Nobile Teatro di San Giacomo di Corfù. Its seemingly comic plot is a severe criticism regarding the living conditions of the Ionian Islands' rural society, against the morality of the indigenous politicians, both during the period under British occupation (1815–1864) and after it.

Xyndas also composed other operatic works, the most notable of which was Anna Winter (based on Dumas' The Three Musketeers), which is the earliest use of a Dumas work in the modern Greek theatre.

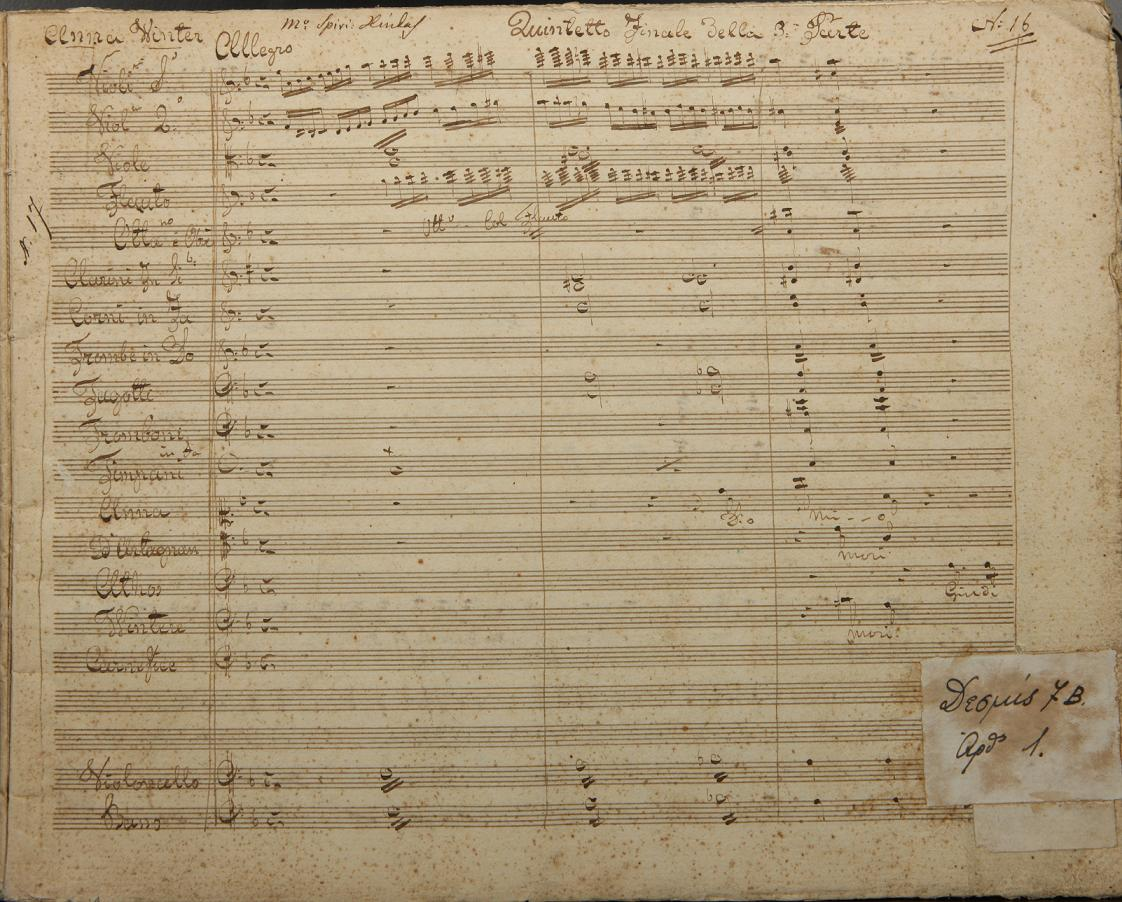
The first page of 'Quinteto Finale' from Act III of the opera Anna Winter by Xyndas (composer's autograph). It is exhibited in the Music Museum of the Philharmonic Society of Corfu.

The 1888, the success of his 'Candidate' Athens, which became the occasion for the creation of the First melodramatic troupe composed of Greeks, led Xyndas and his family to the capital of Greece, where he died in 1896. It is believed that many of his works were destroyed during the 1943 Luftwaffe bombing of the Municipal Theatre of Corfu.

== Operas ==
- Anna Winter ο I tre Moschettieri (1855)
- Il Conte Giuliano (1857)
- Ο υποψήφιος βουλευτής (O ypopsifios vouleftis) [The parliamentary candidate] (1867)
- Ο νεόγαμπρος (O neogambros) ("The newlywed") (1877)
- I due pretendenti (1878)
- Galatea (1895; incomplete)

== See also ==
- Ionian School
- Pavlos Carrer
