= Stefano Moretti =

Greek musician

Stefano Moretti (born Ancona, Italy) was a musician, singer and teacher of music upon the island of Corfu.

== Biography ==
Moretti was maestro al cembalo of a group within Naples. The group had performed during 1790 within San Giacomo. He is considered important to the ascendancy of Ionian music through his tuition of the author of the melody for the Greek National Anthem, Nikolaos Mantzaros.
