= Elisabeth Sakellariou =

Greek architect (born 1939)

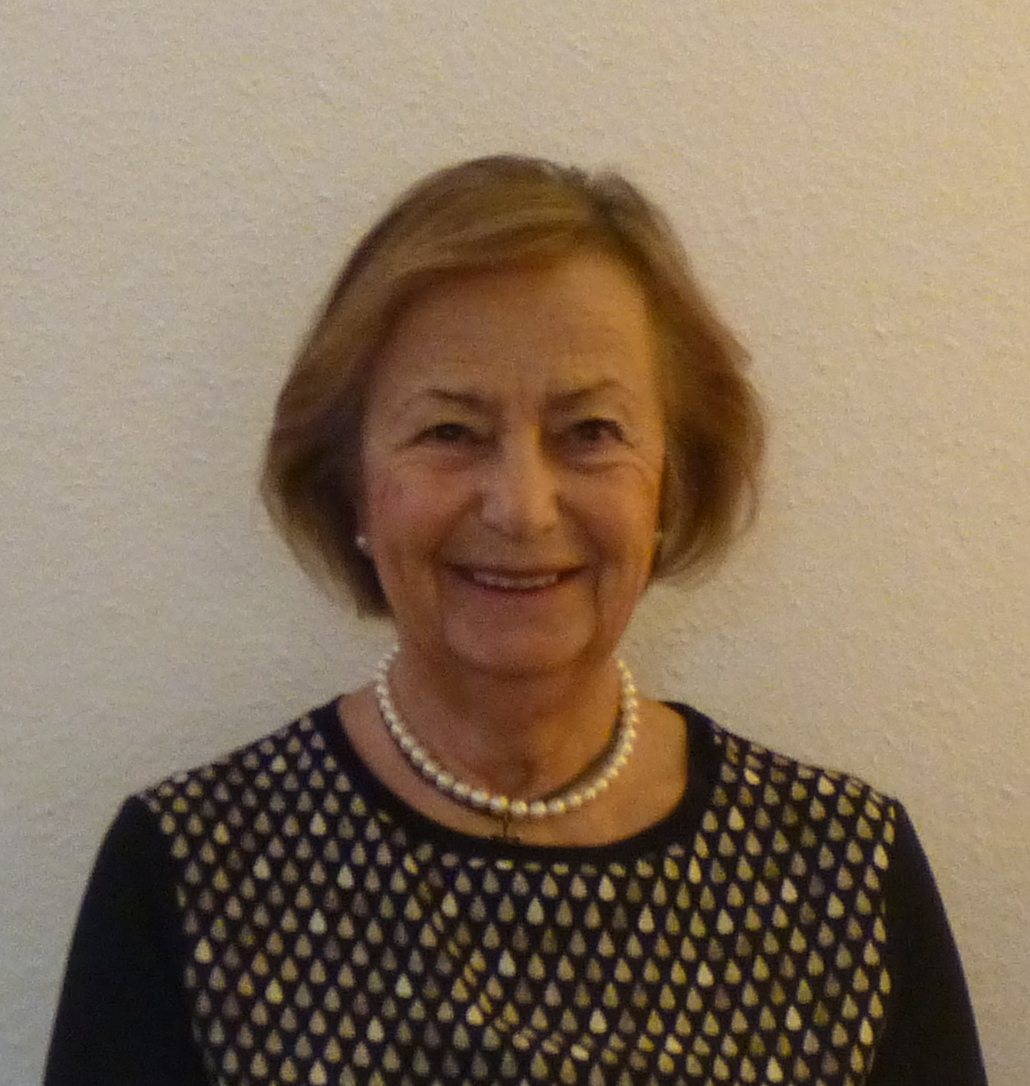
- Born: April 1939
- Occupation: Greek architect
- Spouse: H.E. Senkowsky
- Father: Perikles A. Sakellario

Elisabeth Sakellariou (born April 1939) is a Greek architect.

== Early life ==
Elisabeth Sakellariou is the daughter of Perikles A. Sakellario, also a Greek architect. She trained at the Architectural Association School of Architecture (1958-1963) and at Saint Martin's School of Art (1957 -1960) in London.

== Career ==
In 1963 Sakellariou worked in Athens. From 1964 to 1965 she worked in Paris for Georges Candilis on urban and tourist developments in Corsica. In 1966, Sakellariou returned to Greece and until 1973 worked at P. A. Sakellarios and Associates as a partner, alongside H.E. Senkowsky and Koula Kampani. Sakellario married Austrian architect H. E. Senkowsky in 1966.

Sakellariou was the founding member of the firm ARSY Co. She specialized in hospital design. During this period Sakellariou was also the Greek correspondent for the magazine L’Architecture d’Aujourd’hui.

In 1973 she and her husband set up their own practice under the name Senkowsky-Sakellarios, Architects and Town Planners. Sakellariou has been a member of the Hellenic Architectural Society since 1968, and is a founding member of the Lykeion ton Hellinidon in Bonn, Germany, where she served as President from 1997 to 2001.

== Buildings ==
In collaboration with Sakellarios, Senkowsky, Kampani:

- 1967 - 1972 Corfu International Airport
- 1968 - 1970 Extension to the Hotel Corfu Palace, Corfu
- 1969 - 1970 Greek Pavilion in the Osaka World Fair EXPO 70
- 1969 - 1971 National Bank of Greece, Corfu
- 1972 - 1974 Office and Printing -Press complex for the Athens Newspapers, Apoyevmatini and Akropolis

As a partner together with H. E. Senkowsky:

- 1972 - 1974 Restoration and new building complex in Agia Pelagia Estate, Corfu
- 1974 - 1978 Restoration and additions to Villa Fontana Estate, Corfu
- 1974 - 1976 Farm house in Peloponnese (Earned Award for Habitation Space 1974)
- 1975 - 1976 Nana Mouskouri’s house, Corfu. (Earned Award for Habitation Space 1978)
- 1977 - 1979 Office Building, “Stoa Pappou”, Athens.
- 1990 - 1993 Consulting and supervising the German Embassy in Athens

== Books ==
- Sakellariou, Elisabeth; Fessas-Emmanouil, Helen (2006). Architect's vision, P.A. Sakellarios. Potamos. ISBN 978-960-6691-00-3.
- Ελληνική Αρχιτεκτονική Εταιρεία Αρχιτέκτονες του 20ου Αιώνα, Ελένη Φεσσά-Εμμανουήλ POTAMOS Publishers (ISBN 978-960-6691-38-6)
