= Isabella d'Aspeno =

- Opera by Pavlos Carrer
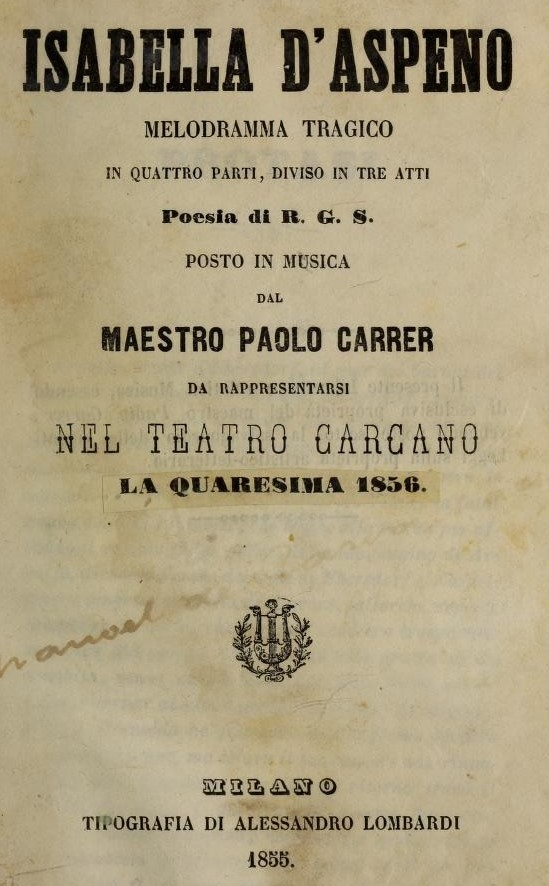
- Title page of the libretto published for the performances at the Teatro Carcano, Milan
- Librettist: "R.G.S."
- Premiere: 7 February 1854; Teatro San Giacomo, Corfu

Isabella d'Aspeno is an opera in three acts composed by Pavlos Carrer. The author of its Italian-language libretto is credited only with the initials "R.G.S.". The opera premiered at the Teatro San Giacomo in Corfu on 7 February 1854. The following year, the opera had its Italian premiere at Milan's Teatro Carcano where it achieved considerable success with multiple performances over two seasons. Set in Westphalia during the 14th Century, the plot of Isabella d'Aspeno bears several thematic similarities to Verdi's later opera, Un ballo in maschera. Both involve the assassination of a sovereign by his political and romantic rival during a masquerade ball.

== Background and performance history ==
After early successes in his native island of Zakynthos which included a short operatic scena, Il pellegrino di Castiglia (The Pilgrim of Castile), Carrer moved to Milan in 1850 where his orchestral works found considerable favour. With the patronage of the music publisher Francesco Lucca, his first full-length opera, Dante e Bice, was premiered at the Teatro Carcano two years later. Carrer's second opera, Isabella d'Aspeno, premiered in Corfu on 7 February 1854 and received its Italian premiere on 9 April 1855 at the Carcano. The title role in the Italian premiere was sung by Adelaide Dall'Argine who was particularly known for her portrayal of Abigaille in Verdi's Nabucco. The two leading male roles were taken by Antonio Ghislanzoni, a baritone who later achieved his principal fame as a literary figure and opera librettist, and his cousin Giacinto Ghislanzoni, a tenor with an active operatic career in Northern Italy. The premiere evening also included what the Teatro Carcano's historian termed an "extraordinary amusement", a separate performance of songs accompanied by Johann Decker-Schenk on his newly invented pedal guitar. Isabella d'Aspeno had a notable success in Milan with multiple performances in the 1855 season and a revival in March 1856. When it was staged in Patras on 23 May 1860, it became the first opera by a Greek composer to be performed in the then Kingdom of Greece.

The opera's librettist, is credited only with the initials "R.G.S." on the printed libretto, although the Biblioteca Nazionale Braidense attributes it to Giuseppe Sapio who would write the libretto for Carrer's third opera, La rediviva. Several authors have noted thematic similarities between the plot of Isabella and Verdi's Un ballo in maschera which premiered five years later. In both operas a ruler (Arnolfo in Carrer's opera and Riccardo in Verdi's) is killed at a masked ball by his political and romantic rival. Both operas also have a mysterious gypsy fortune teller who directs the heroine to gather magic herbs in a "horrid place" to concoct a potion which will free her from her forbidden love. In Carrer's opera the place is a ruined graveyard; in Verdi's it is a hanging ground. The libretto of Isabella d'Aspeno shares several of its characters' names and its setting with The House of Aspen, a play by Sir Walter Scott written in 1799 and published in 1829. Based on a retelling of Leonhard Wächter's Die Heilige Vehme, oder, Der Sturtz der Aspenauer (The Holy Vehme, or The Fall of the House of Aspen), Scott's play recounts the aftermath of the death of the Arnolfo/Arnolf character with Isabella accused of his murder.

== Roles ==
| Role | Voice type | Italian premiere cast 9 April 1855 |
|---|---|---|
| Rudigero, Baron of Aspen | baritone | Antonio Ghislanzoni |
| Isabella, Rudigero's wife | soprano | Adelaide Dall'Argine |
| Arnolfo, Count of Ebersdorf | tenor | Giacinto Ghislanzoni |
| Rainoldo, Arnolfo's cousin | bass | Bartolomeo Gandini |
| Ebba, a gypsy fortune teller | mezzo-soprano | Lucia Viale |
| Ugo, Arnolfo's squire | baritone | Alessandro Trabattoni |
Arnolfo's soldiers and vassals, knights and ladies, squires, peasants, Rainoldo's followers, masked guests at the ball

== Recordings ==
The opera's prelude recorded by Byron Fidetzis conducting the Pasardjik Symphony Orchestra appears as an extra track on his complete recording of Carrer's one-act opera Despo (Lyra 0792).
