= Antonios Liveralis =

Greek conductor and composer

Antonios Liveralis or Liberalis (Greek: Αντώνιος Λιβεράλης or Λιμπεράλης, Italian: Antonio Liberali; 1814 in Corfu – 1842 in Corfu) was a Greek conductor and composer of the early Ionian school. He was the son of Italian conductor Domenico Liberali and one of Nikolaos Mantzaros' favorite students. He later continued his studies at the Conservatory of San Pietro a Majella in Naples. When he returned to Corfu he was joyfully received into the circle of national composers, where he was considered a musician of great talent. He then began working as assistant to his teacher Mantzaros, who left him very little time for his own compositions. He was among the first teachers of his younger brother Iosif and served as vice director of music to the Philharmonic Society of Corfu.

Liveralis' compositions are largely limited to minor forms. He wrote a series of fixed funeral marches, which were later published in two volumes. The march O Kambouris (Ο Καμπούρης, 'The Hunchback') achieved great popularity in Corfu. He also devoted himself to composing piano music and to the creation of a rich song repertoire. His one-act opera is the only sure finished work for the stage by the composer. He was born a Catholic, but was converted to Greek Orthodox faith and adopted the patriotic name of Eleftheriadis (Greek: Ελευθεριάδης). After his untimely death, he was buried in a magnificent funeral to which the orchestra of the Philharmonic Society of Corfu played.
