= Ionian school (music) =

Group of Heptanesian composers

The term Ionian (or Heptanese) school of music (Greek: Επτανησιακή Σχολή, literally: "Seven Islands' school") denotes the musical production of a group of Heptanesian composers, whose heyday was from the early 19th century till approximately the 1950s. Conventionally, it is divided in two periods: the first generation (Πρὠτη Γενιά) from 1815, till the end of the 1860s, and the second generation (Δεύτερη Γενιά) from 1871 and onwards. Prominent representatives of this genre include Nikolaos Mantzaros, Spyridon Xyndas, Spyridon Samaras and Pavlos Carrer. Other composers include Dionysius Rodotheatos, Iosif Liveralis, Antonios Liveralis, Georgios Lambiris, Iosif Kaisaris, Spyridon Kaisaris, Dionysios Lavrangas, Eleni Lambiri and later Dionysios Visvardis.

The Music Museum of the Philharmonic Society of Corfu has in its collections several scores by these and other 19th and 20th century Ionian composers.

== History ==
The major inspiration for the Ionian school was considered to be the Italian musical tradition. However, as late as the 1820s composers from Ionian Islands succeeded in shaping their own path towards 'national music' initially by using the Greek vernacular language, and later by incorporating folklore elements both from the local tradition and from that of mainland Greece.

== Gallery ==
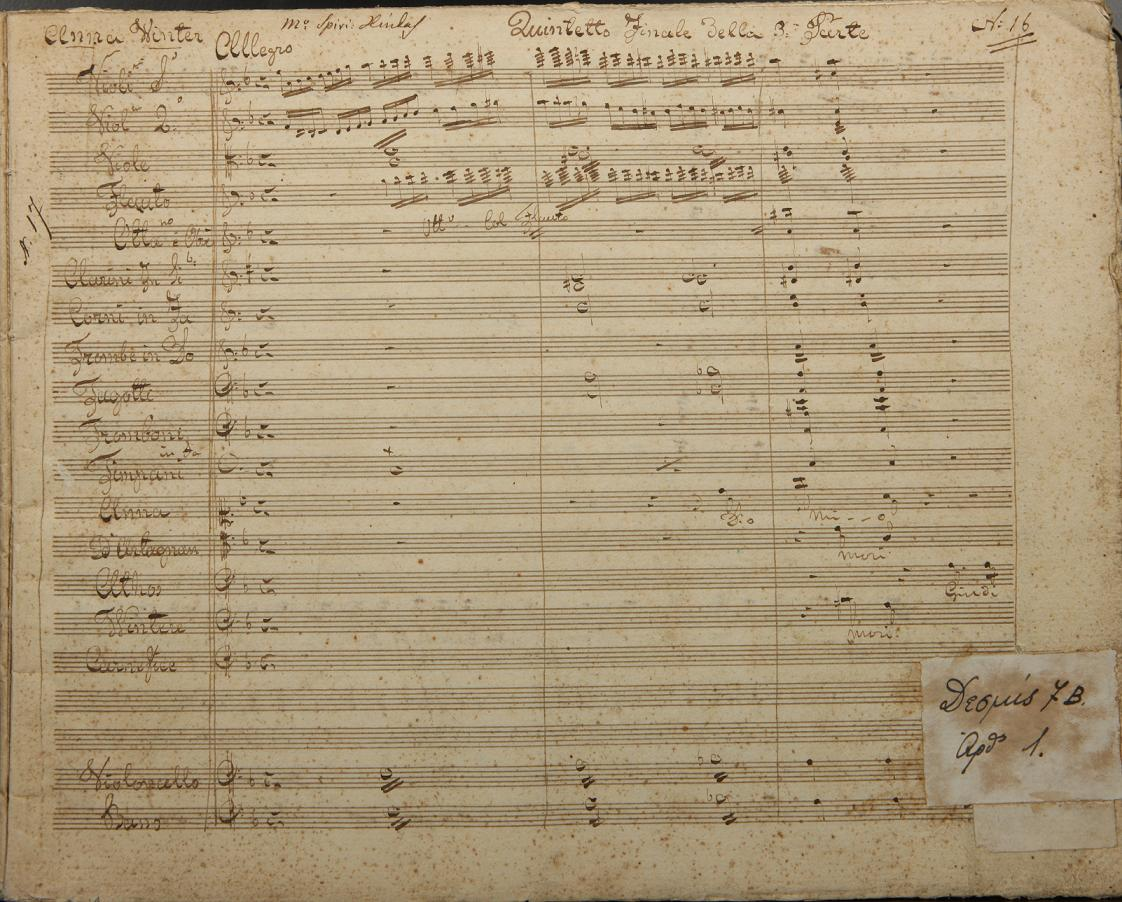
The first page of "Quinteto Finale" from Act III of the opera Anna Winter by Xyndas (composer's autograph). It is exhibited in the Museum of the Philharmonic Society of Corfu

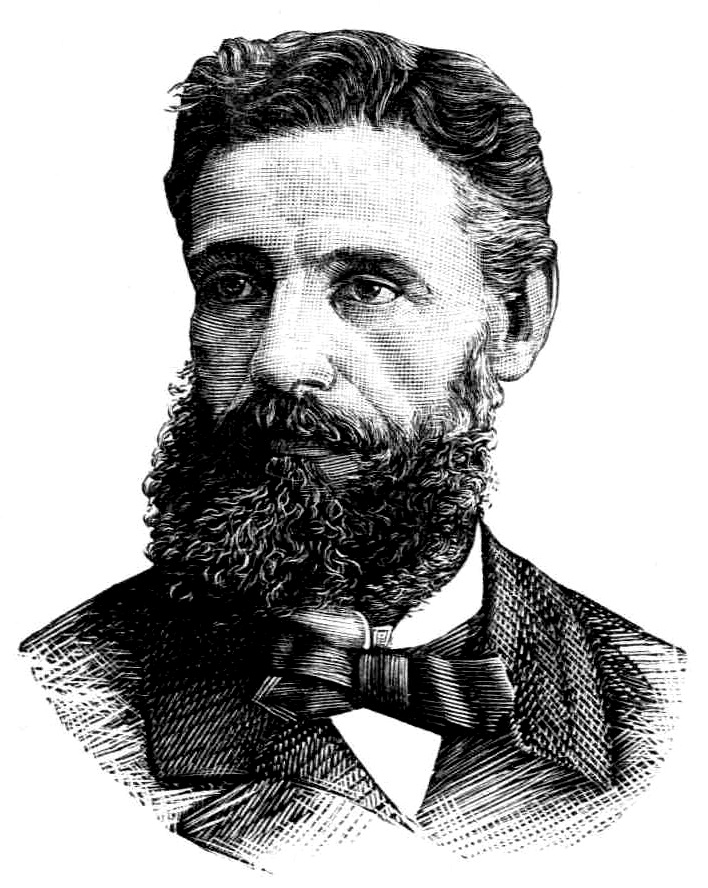
Georgios Lambiris

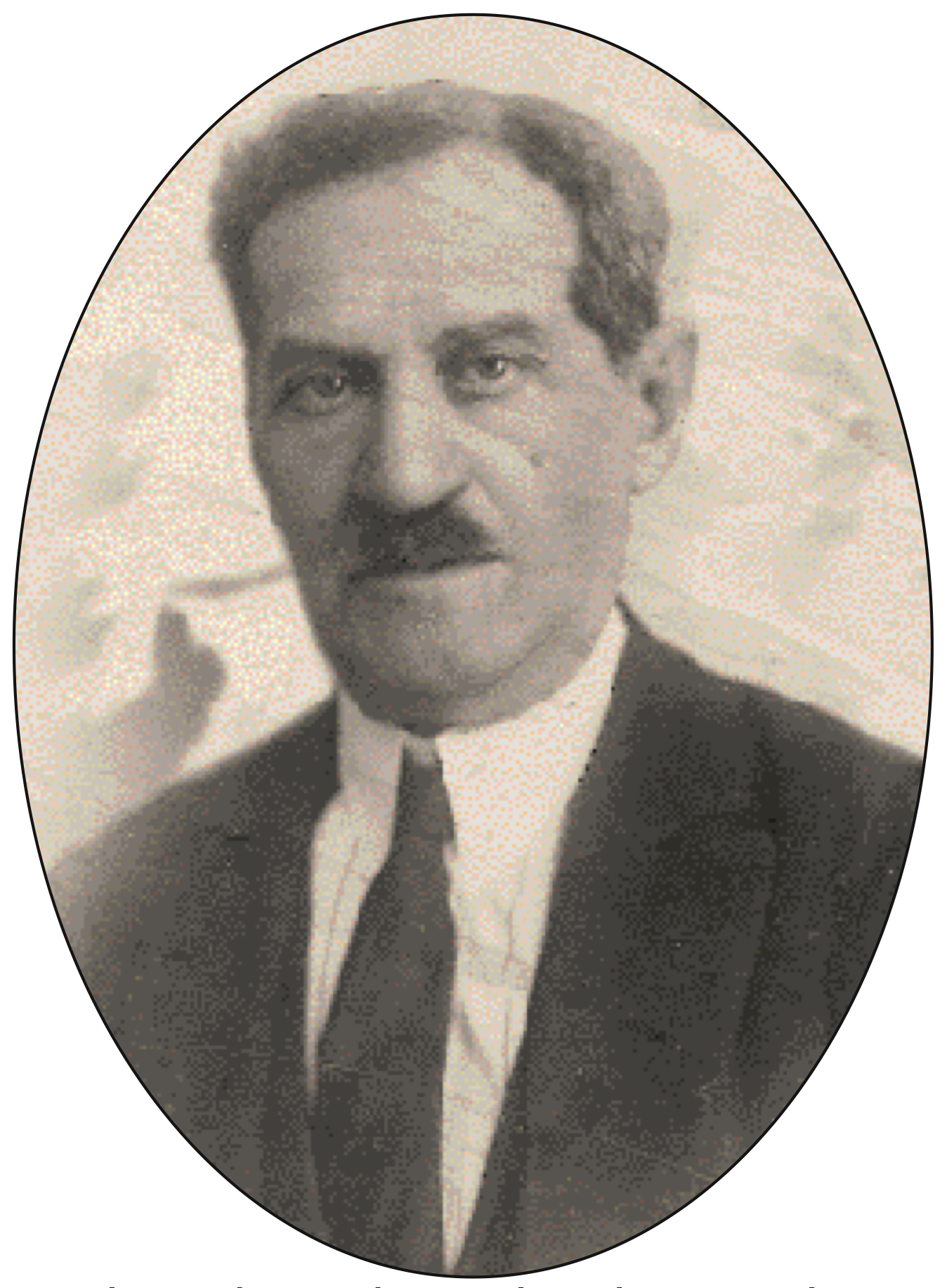
Dionysios Lavrangas

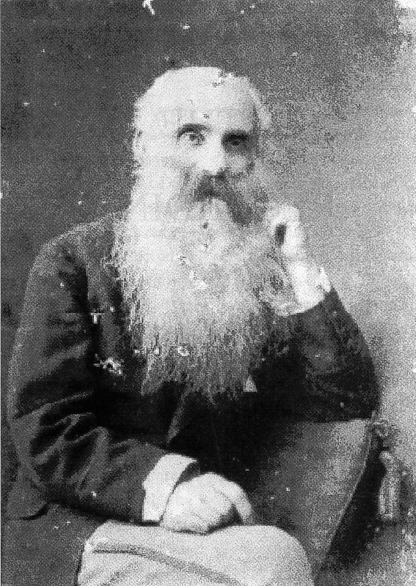
Iosif Liberalis

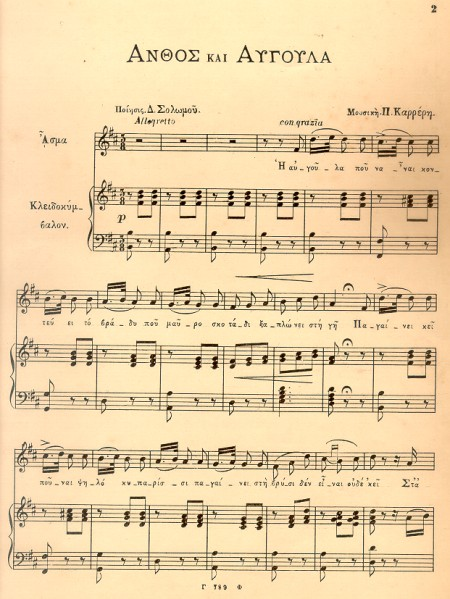
First page of Karrer's song "Anthos kai Avgoula"

== See also ==
- Music of the Ionian Islands, the folk music of the islands

== Bibliography ==
- The New Grove Dictionary of Music and Musicians, London 2001, ISBN 0-333-60800-3
- Stanley I. Sadie: The New Grove dictionary of Opera, London 1992, ISBN 0-333-48552-1
- Friedrich Blume (Hrsg.): Die Musik in Geschichte und Gegenwart, München und Kassel 1989, ISBN 3-7618-5913-9 (in German)
- Xepapadakou, Avra (2013). "Pavlos Carrer [Paolo Karrer]". Grove Music Dictionary. New York: Oxford University Press.
