= Municipal Theatre of Corfu =

Former theatre in Greece (1902–1943)

Coordinates: 39°37′19″N 19°55′11″E

The Municipal Theatre of Corfu (Greek: Δημοτικό Θέατρο Κέρκυρας) was the main theatre and opera house in Corfu, Greece, from 1902 to 1943. The theatre was the successor of the Nobile Teatro di San Giacomo di Corfù, which became the Corfu city hall. It was destroyed during a Luftwaffe aerial bombardment in 1943. During its 41-year history it was one of the premier theatres and opera houses in Greece, and as the first theatre in Southeastern Europe, it contributed to the Arts and to the history of the Balkans and of Europe.

== History and architecture ==
Interior of the Municipal Theatre of Corfu

Municipal Theatre of Corfu

The municipal theatre was built to accommodate the demands of a growing audience. The decision for its construction was taken in 1885, during the mayoralty of Georgios Theotokis, and construction started in 1893 by mayor Michael Theotokis. High construction costs delayed its inaugural opening until 1902. The architect was the Italian Conrado Pergolesi who developed plans modelled after La Scala in Milan. The maximum height of the theatre was 39 meters; there was a gallery at the front entrance adorned by high columns of the Tuscan order. The entrance featured large purple columns and its high walls were decorated with frescoes of famous composers created by Italian artists. The upper floor was decorated by four Corinthian order semi-columns and a gable. The official emblem shield of Corfu stood in relief at the centre of the gable surrounded by a laurel wreath.

The auditorium included 64 decorated boxes arranged in three levels and a gallery for the general public at the top. The first box in the first row was reserved for the theatre committee. Behind this box, inside an office, the archives of Nobile Teatro di San Giacomo were kept.

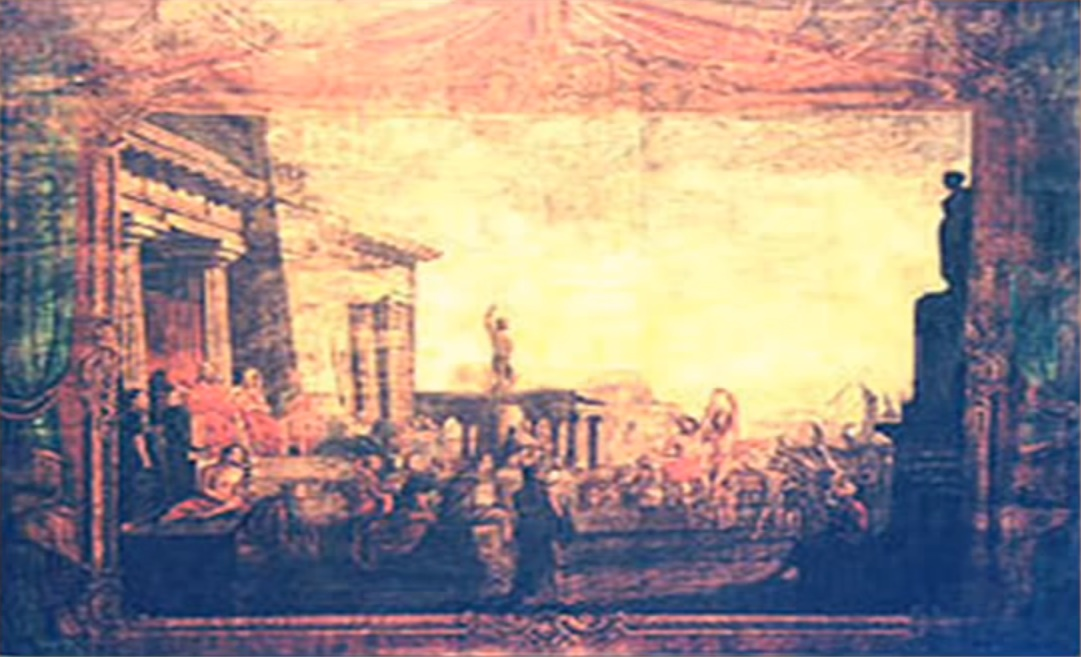
The historic stage curtain of Teatro di San Giacomo depicting a scene from the Odyssey. It is the only artefact known to have survived the bombardment.

The first box of the second row was reserved for the Greek royal family. All boxes included gas lights at their bow. The commoners gathered at the top level in the gallery. There was a proscenium which accommodated the orchestra. The orchestra was mainly made up of locals and it performed 10 operas per cycle. Opera season started in September and ended on the Sunday before Ash Monday.

The stage curtain of the new theatre was inherited from its predecessor, Teatro di San Giacomo, and was created by an Italian artist. It depicted a scene from the Odyssey where Odysseus was welcomed by King Alcinous to the land of the Phaiakes.

The theatre was considered one of Europe's best, with great acoustics and richly decorated interiors depicting ancient Greek gods and musical themes, painted by Italian artists. It also functioned as a social gathering place where high society gathered for dances and balls. Its official opening date was 7 December 1902, with Wagner's opera Lohengrin as the inaugural performance. Kaiser Wilhelm II also attended performances while vacationing at his Achilleion palace. In 1907 the Old Philharmonic of Corfu rendered a symphony in a performance which received much acclaim from the audience.

From 19 January 1916 through to 19 November 1918, the theatre also served as the place of assembly for the Serbian Parliament in exile, and the decision for the creation of the new united Kingdom of Yugoslavia was taken there. In 1923, refugees from Asia Minor were accommodated in the theatre boxes.

During the first quarter of the twentieth century, many Italian operas were performed at the theatre. This tradition came to a halt following the bombardment of Corfu in 1923 by the Italians. After the bombardment the theatre featured Greek operas as well as Greek theatre performances by distinguished Greek actors such as Marika Kotopouli and Pelos Katselis.

The cost of the building escalated to about 1,000,000 British golden sovereigns, a huge amount at the time; its amortization was arranged for 1941. Two years later, on the night of 13 September 1943, the theatre was destroyed in a bombing raid by Hitler's Luftwaffe.

The archives of the theatre, including the historical San Giacomo archives, all valuables and art were destroyed in the bombing with the sole exception of the stage curtain, which was not in the premises the night of the bombing and thus escaped harm; among the losses are believed to have been numerous manuscripts of the work of Spyridon Xyndas, composer of the first opera in Greek. The remains of the building were considered to be without historical or other value and were condemned following a decision by the supervising architect Ioannis Kollas and civil engineers Georgios Linardos and Renos Paipetis. On 31 May 1952, mayor Stamatis Desyllas and the city council unanimously decided to demolish the theatre despite widespread public protests and legal challenges.

== Gallery ==
Municipal Theatre of Corfu being built, featuring the original dome which was later removed for sound-enhancement reasons

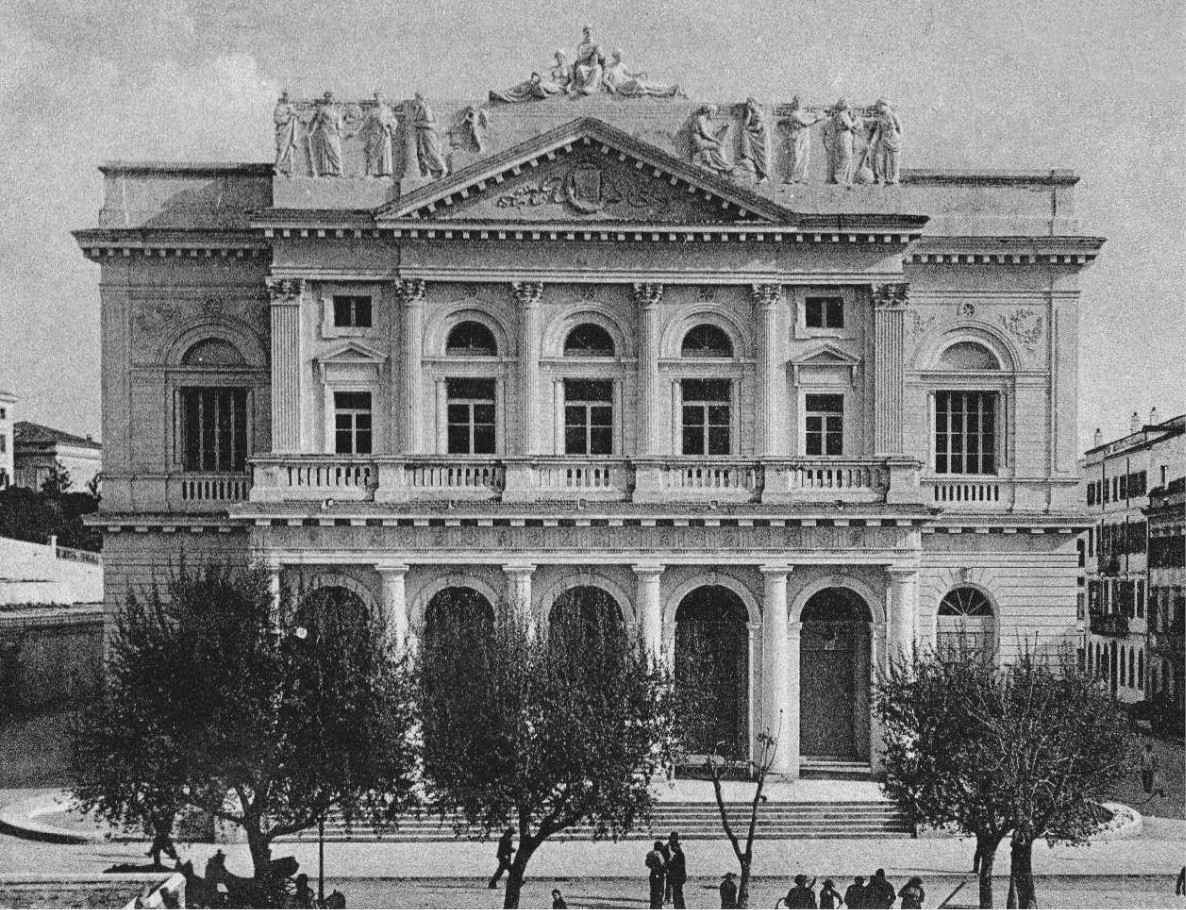
Municipal Theatre of Corfu in 1901–1902

The new brutalist municipal theatre, by Perikles A. Sakellarios
