= Perikles A. Sakellarios =

Greek architect (1905-1985)

Perikles A. Sakellarios (September 1905 – March 1985), was one of the leading figures in Greek architecture between 1936 and 1985.

== Biography ==
Born in Corfu on 13 September 1905, first son of Aristides Sakellarios and Thalia Mavrogianni. Attended primary and secondary schools in Corfu and Thessaloniki. He studied at the Technical Department of the Calvin College in Geneva (1920-1921) and completed his secondary education at the First Secondary School of Thessaloniki in 1923, being an excellent student at both institutions. Aged 12 years only, he won one of two of the prestigious Monteseigny Foundation scholarships. He studied Architecture at the Technical University in Graz (1924-1930) under Karl Hoffman and Friedrich Zotter. Married to: Antigoni Petrocheilou (1932-1935), Ekaterini (Ina) Pappou (1937-1945, granddaughter of Greek Prime Minister Dimitrios Rallis, cousin of Greek Prime Minister Georgios Rallis), Valentina Theotoki (1947-1957), Koula Kambani (1968-1972). One daughter: Elisabeth Sakellariou-Herzog (*1939). Pericles Sakellarios died on March 5, 1985, in Athens.

=== Career ===
1931 At the beginning of his career, he worked for a short spell as an assistant to Andreas Kriezis (1887-1962). His projects include the remodeling the Old Royal Palace to accommodate the Greek Parliament and Senate.

In 1931 he moved to Volos where he worked for the Technical Service of the Township of Pagases until 1935.

In 1936 he returned to Athens where he was employed by the newly formed technical service of the Ministry of Public Health and Welfare. The period of 1936 to 1941 was the most creative periods in his life and career. During this time, in addition to numerous private commissions, he was appointed as the official architect of King George II of Greece. He remodeled the royal palace of Tatoi, the royal palace of Psychiko and Mon Repos in Corfu.

1941-1945 During the German-Italian Occupation he was held hostage by the Greek People's Liberation Army in December 1944, from which he was liberated by the Allied forces.

1946 Still working as a civil servant, he was chosen as the official representative of his Ministry to travel to Britain and the United States in order to visit public buildings (mainly hospitals) and meet with experts.

In late 1946 he abandoned his career as a civil servant and set up his practice as a freelance architect in Athens.

From 1955 to 1961 he formed a collaboration with Manolis Vourekas (1905-1992) and Prokopis Vassiliadis (1912-1977). Projects resulting from this collaboration include the avant-garde Astir Beach and resort facilities in Glyfada (1955–58), the public beach in Vouliagmeni and the Argo and Okeanis restaurants (1959–61).

In 1959 he was chosen by Walter Gropius as an associate of the architectural firm The Architects Collaborative for the construction of the new US Embassy in Athens.

In 1966 he set up his first joint practice under the name “ P.A. Sakellarios and Associates”. His partners were his daughter Elisabeth Sakellariou-Senkowsky, her husband Hermann Senkowsky and his future wife Koula Kambani.

Sakellarios was a member of the Technical Chamber of Greece, the Architect's Association, the Hellenic Architectural Society. He served as a board member of the International Union of Architects (UIA). He acted as technical advisor to the Greek National Tourism Organization and to the Psychiko Community.

In 1966 he was designated Commander of the Royal Order of the Phoenix, an honor awarded to him for his contribution to the country's reconstruction.

In 1982, the Technical University of Graz awarded him an honorary diploma for his exceptional half-century of professional practice.

=== Influence on modern Greek architecture ===
Pericles Sakellarios was one of the leading figures in Greek architecture between 1936 and 1962.

Sakellarios' products included buildings and complexes-mainly houses that attracted the interest of the international architectural press. He designed leisure homes and open-air cinemas, theaters, motels and beach resorts.

== Notable buildings ==
1932-1933 Apostolos Papageorgiou, Volos, private house

1936 Vassilis Goumas house, Athens

1937-1939 Lambros Eftaxias residence, Athens

1947-1949 Dallis Restaurant, Athens

1949-1950 Greek Special Forces Chapel, Kavouri, Athens

1953-1958 Corfu Palace Hotel, Corfu

1955-1958 Astir Beach and Resort Facilities, Glyfada (in collaboration)

1959-1961 Embassy of the United States in Athens, Athens (project by TAC)

1961 Corfu Harbour, Passenger Terminal

1962-1974 Municipal Theatre of Corfu

1962-1963 Architect's own summer house in Corfu

1970 The Greek Pavilion in the Osaka World Fair

1981-1982 Theodoros Angelopoulos, private house, Athens
