= Pavlos Carrer =

Greek composer (1829–1896)

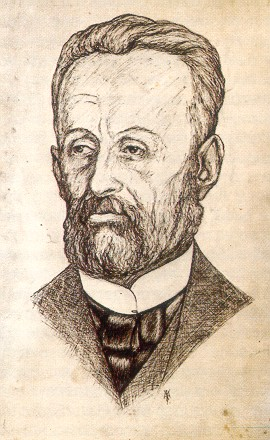
Pavlos Carrer

Pavlos Carrer (also Paolo Carrer; Greek: Παύλος Καρρέρ), born Pavlos Carreris (Greek: Παύλος Kαρρέρης) (12 May 1829 – 7 June 1896), was a Greek composer, one of the leaders of the Ionian art music school and the first to create national operas and national songs on Greek plots, Greek librettos and verses, as well as melodies inspired by the folk and the urban popular musical tradition of modern Greece.

== Biography ==
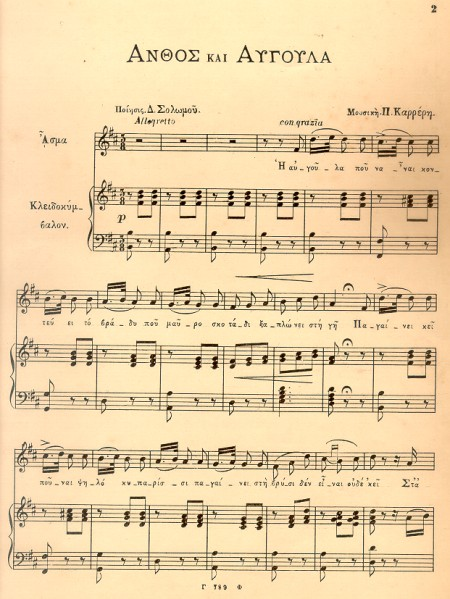
First page of Pavlos Karrer's song "Anthos kai Avgoula"

Carrer was a descendant of a noble family of Zante. He studied music in his birthplace with the Italian teachers Giuseppe Cricca, Francesco Marangoni and possibly in Corfu with Nikolaos Mantzaros. A natural musical talent, but also in harmony with the cultural atmosphere of the Ionian Islands of the time, which was dominated by Italian opera and western European culture, he composed his first small musical pieces in the late 1840s. The operatic 'scena' Il pellegrino di Castiglia attracted the public's attention when it was staged at the ‘Apollon’ Municipal Theatre of Zante.

In 1850, in the peak of the Risorgimento, the young Pavlos Carrer moved to Milan, the operatic capital of Europe (then under Austrian occupation), in order to specialize in his music studies. There he took private courses with Raimondo Boucheron, Pietro Tassistro and Giuseppe Winter. In the same year, he presented a concert at the ‘Carcano’ theatre with his first instrumental works. He also composed the music score for Tomaso Casati's ballet Bianca di Belmonte, produced at the ‘Teatro della Canobbiana’. Mentored by Francesco Lucca, the powerful Italian music publisher, Carrer made his debut as an opera composer in August 1852 at the ‘Carcano’, with Dante e Bice, an opera in three parts to a libretto by Serafino Torelli. The work, which seems to have annoyed the Austrian police by its political connotations, deals with the Italian national poet Dante Alighieri, his unfulfilled love for Beatrice Portinari, his political activities and the writing of the Divine Comedy. In the next year, Carrer cooperated with the choreographer Andrea Palladino for the production of a comic ballet entitled Cadet, il barbiere, which was staged at ‘La Canobbiana’ theatre with mediocre success. However, the same year would bring a great success to the young composer: the three-act opera Isabella d’Aspeno, which was presented at the ‘San Giacomo’ theatre of Corfu, followed by a triumphant series of performances at the Milanese ‘Carcano’ (April 1854 and March 1856). The work, to a libretto by an unknown author signing with the initials R.G.S. (possibly Giuseppe Sapio), occupies an important position in the Italian operatic creation of mezzo ottocento, as it seems to have been one of the many prototypes of Verdi’s famous opera, Un ballo in maschera.

Carrer’s success in the Milanese stages was crowned with the production of the grand opéra La Rediviva, in three acts to a libretto by Giuseppe Sapio. The work was received with enthusiasm when it premiered at the ‘Carcano’ (January 1856), a success that was continued at the ‘Teatro Comunale’ of Como (January 1857) and at the ‘San Giacomo’ of Corfu (December 1857). Throughout his stay in Italy Carrer also composed salon music, especially opera paraphrases for piano and flute, dances and solfège exercises.

With dreams of founding a national music and of becoming the first Greek national composer, Carrer was repatriated in 1857 and settled in Zante. He worked as a conductor and impresario in local theatres, taught music and married the talented soprano and interpreter of his works, Isabella Giatrà. At the same time he composed his first national opera, the four-act Marco Bozzari (1858–60), as well as numerous art songs in Greek lyrics, among which the celebrated klephtiko, ‘Ho Gero Dēmos’ [Old man Dēmos]. This song, written in the Greek traditional style of dēmoticà, was incorporated in the above-mentioned opera. Marco Bozzari, after a series of misadventures, caused by its patriotic and anti-Ottoman content, opened in Patras in April 1861. It is considered Carrer's most famous work and the most popular Greek opera during the 19th and early 20th centuries, with a record of more than 45 different stagings. The work, initially composed to an Italian libretto written by Giovanni Caccialupi, was soon translated and performed in Greek, often causing the audience's enthusiasm in the theaters where it was presented.

Similar in concept, though more elaborate in terms of composition, are his other two national operas, the oriental and atmospheric Kyra Phrosyinē (libretto by Elisavetios Martinegkos, performed at the ‘Apollon’ of Zante, in November 1868) and the heroic-style Despo (libretto by Antonios Manousos, opened at the ‘Apollon’ of Patras, in December 1882). Both the first, a mature work with a strong couleur locale and sensuality, and the second, an opera with a marked national stamp, dense in traditional melodic patterns, are imprinted on compact disc and are accessible to the public.

Along with his national melodramas, Carrer continued to compose Italian-style operas, such as Fior di Maria (libretto by Giovanni Caccialupi, staged at the San Giacomo of Corfu, in January 1868), in which realistic and pre-veristic elements are detected. Decisive steps towards dramatic and musical realism were made with his historic opera Maria Antonietta (libretto by Giorgio Roma, opened at the Foskolos theatre of Zante, January 1884).

A special place in his operatic creation is held by Marathōn-Salamis, an ambitious opera in four parts (composed c.1886–8), combining a Classical theme with a proto-impressionist musical idiom and a hint of Wagnerian unifying procedures. Carrer never saw this last opera on stage, for it was first presented in Athens 115 years after its composition by the Greek National Opera.

Finally, Carrer left a legacy of two unfinished projects, the national style three-act opera Lambros il brulottiere (about 1886) and the operetta Conte Spourgitis [Count Sparrow] (1886–7). There is also meager evidence of another opera, unidentified and lost today, entitled Don Pigna.

Pavlos Carrer was one of the most popular and widely performed composers in 19th-century Greece, while achieving a considerable reputation in Italy. He followed closely the developments in European opera, lent an ear to artistic modernism and constantly updated his compositional practice. In his musical style Italian influences are evident, mainly from Verdi's middle period and the late bel canto. However, his musical idiom is distinguished for its unique personal style, and for his efforts to bring Greek national coloring in his creations. Pavlos Carrer played a leading role in the most characteristic evolution in the field of Greek art music that took place in the Ionian islands of the mid-19th century and concerned the first systematic effort of creating a national opera.

== Works ==
Stage

- Il pellegrino di Castiglia (op scene, G. Laguidaras), Zante, c1849–50, lost
- Bianca di Belmonte, 1850 (azione coreografica, T. Casati), Milan, Canobbiana, Dec 1850, music lost, publ. lib in I-Mc
- Dante e Bice c1851–2 (melodramma storico-fantastico, 3, S. Torelli), Milan, Carcano, 24 Aug 1852, music lost, pubd lib in I-Mc
- Cadet, Il barbiere 1853 (balletto comico, A. Palladino), Milan, Canobbiana, 4 June 1853, music lost, publ. lib in I-Mb
- Isabella d’Aspeno 1853 (melodramma tragico, 3, ‘R. G. S.’, after Eu. Scribe), Corfu, S Giacomo, 7 Feb 1854, I-Mc
- La Rediviva 1855 (tragedia lirica, prol., 3, G. Sapio, after B. du Samblon, An. Bourgeois and G. Lemoine), Milan, Carcano, 19 Jan 1856, I-Mc
- Marco Bozzari, 1857–60 (tragedia lirica, 4, G. Caccialupi), Patras, Apollon, 18 [30] April 1861, music lost, publ. lib.
- Fior di Maria, ovvero i misteri di Parigi, 1867 (os, 4, G. Caccialupi, after E. Sue), Corfu, San Giacomo, Jan 1868, vs, Gr-An
- Ē kyra Phrosynē [Lady Phrosynē] 1868 (os, 4, E. Martinegkos, after Ar. Valaōritēs), Zante, Apollon, 16 Nov 1868
- Maria Antonietta, 1873 (melodramma storico-tragico, 4, G. Romas), Zante, Foscolos, 28 Jan 1884
- Despō, ē hēroïs tou Souliou [Despo, heroine of Souli], 1875 (os, 1, A. Manousos), Patras, Apollon, 25 Dec 1882
- O Psōmozētēs [The old beggar], 1875 (op scene, Al. Soutsos), Athens, Parnassos, 25 March 1887
- Marathōn-Salamis, 1886–8 (op, 4, A. Martzokis), Athens, Olympia, 9 Feb 2003
- Projected operas: Lambros il brulottiere, c1879–85 (os, El. Martinengos), MS lib. frag., unfinished Conte Spourghitis [Count Sparrow], c1886–9 (operetta, 3, I. Tsakassianos), duet pubd in Asty, Athens (18 Dec 1888), unfinished, lost.

Other vocal

- Sacred: Orthodox liturgy, 4 male vv, Oct 1886, lost; Ina ti efryaxan ethni (Ps ii), Benakis Museum, Athens; Missa breve (Ky, Gl, Cr, San), Jesu redemptor, Veni creator, Tantum ergo: all attrib. Carrer
- With orch acc.: O Demos (A. Valaoritis), 1859, O stratiotis/Asma polemou [The Soldier/War Song] (A. Manoussos), 1859, Anthi [Flowers] (G. Candianos-Romas), 1859, I anthopolitra [The Flower Girl] (G. Carvellas) by 1867, Vassilikos hymnos [Royal Anthem], 2 settings, before 22 April 1875, O psomozitis [The Old Beggar] (A. Soustos), before 22 April 1875, Lave ena rhodo agapi mou [Take a Rose, my Darling]: all Benakis Museum, Athens; Nani-nani [Lullaby], before 22 April 1875; Nyktosynavlia (Kytta ti ahno fengari) [Serenade (Look at the Pale Moon)], 1885, Philharmonic Society, Corfu; 3 songs (D. Solomos), male chorus, mandolinata: I xanthoula [The Fair Maiden], I farmakomeni [Poisoned], Pia ein' ekeini [Who is that Maiden]; Mysterion horou [The Mystery of a Ball], lost
- With pf acc., mostly 1v: Una notte sul Pireo, romanza (Milan, ? before 1857); 5 songs, 1859 (Athens, 1887) I katadhiki tou Kléphti [The Condemnation of the Klepht] (I. Typaldos), Barcellona Greca/I fyghi [The Flight] (I. Tyaldos), O Demos [Old Demos] (A. Valaoritis), To Fengari: Dhiati glyko fengari mou [The Moon: Why, o Sweet Moon] (A. Manoussos), I Maria/Molis éfenge t'asteri [Maria/Just as the Star was Dawning] (I. Typaldos); O anthos ke i avgoula [The Flower and the Dawn] (Solomos), 1859 (Athens, c1906); O stratiotis, 1859 (Athens, n.d.), also orchd; Anthi, 1859 (Athens, n.d.), also orchd; To orfano [The Orphan] (A. Paraschos), before 22 April 1875 (Athens, n.d.); Mana ke paedhi [Mother and Child] (Athens, n.d.); Pes mou [Tell me] (Solomos) (Athens, n.d.); I anthopolitra, by 1867, also orchd; O psomozitis, before 22 April 1875, Benakis Museum, Athens, also orchd; To filima [The Kiss] (G. Zalokostas), before 22 April 1875, Benakis Museum, Athens; Hymnos pros tin patridha [Hymn to the Fatherland], Benakis Museum, Athens; Louloudhia emazoxa [I've Picked up Flowers]; The Maid of Athens (G.G. Byron), 2 frags., 1 in Benakis Museum, Athens; O koukos [The Cuckoo], doubtful, though in Carrer's hand; 7 other songs, lost; 8 solfeggi, 1857, lost.

Instrumental

- Pf solo, pubd in Milan before 1857: 44 original pieces, lost except opp. 7–10, 12–15 (1851), 24 (c1851); 40 paraphrases and transcs., lost except Louisa Miller, quadrilles (1851), Divertimento sopra i motivi di Trovatore, pf 4 hands, op.50 (1853), La traviata, divertimento brillante, pf 4 hands, op.55 (1854), Deux pot-pourris brillants sur les meilleurs motifs des Vêpres siciliennes, pf 4 hands, op.87–8 (n.d.), Simone Boccanegra, divertimento, pf 4 hands, op.98 (n.d.)
- Pf solo, after 1857: 45 pieces, 1863–73, all MSS, incl. 15 in Benakis Museum, Athens; other works, lost
- Other works: Marcia funebre nell'opera La rediviva, transcr. band, after 1856; 1885: Din-don polka, insts, 1885, Benakis Museum, Athens; March, F, band; untitled work, F, band, Pot pourris greco di Paolo Careri, band pts; 2 waltzes: A 15 anni, fl, Alleati, fl, also fl, pf: both listed in Ricordi's catalogue (c1905); Giardino musicale: 20 fantasie sopra i migliori motivi delle opere moderne, fl, pf, op.67, collab. F. Pizzi; many other transcrs., mostly fl, pf, some pubd (Milan, n.d.), others listed in Ricordi's catalogue (c1905)
- Principal publishers: Canti, Féxis (Athens), Lucca (Milan), Veloudhios

== Recordings ==
- Pavlos Karrer, Despo, Markos Botsaris (excerpts) (LP released by the 'Friends of the Museum of Solomos and Distinguished Zantiotes', Zante, 1989) EMI MT15117
- Paolo Carrer, Frossini (Lyra, ML0669/70, 1998)
- Paolo Carrer, Despo (Lyra, CD0792, 2002) (this recording includes, apart from Despo, the prelude to "Isabella d'Aspeno", the overture to "Maria Antonietta", "Gero-Demos", three songs for soprano and orchestra and a polka for orchestra)

== See also ==
- Ionian School
