= Philharmonic Society of Corfu =

Community music band in Corfu, Greece

- Φιλαρμονική Εταιρεία Κέρκυρας
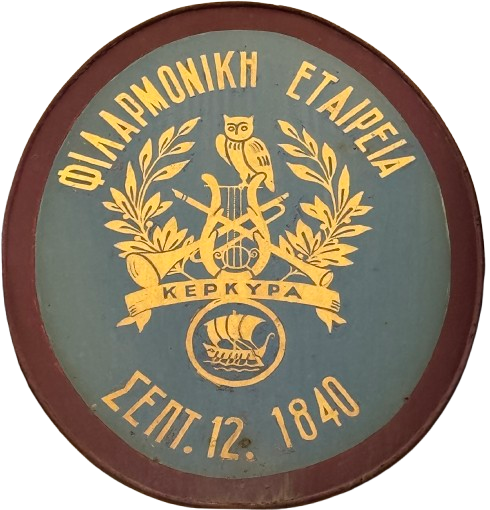

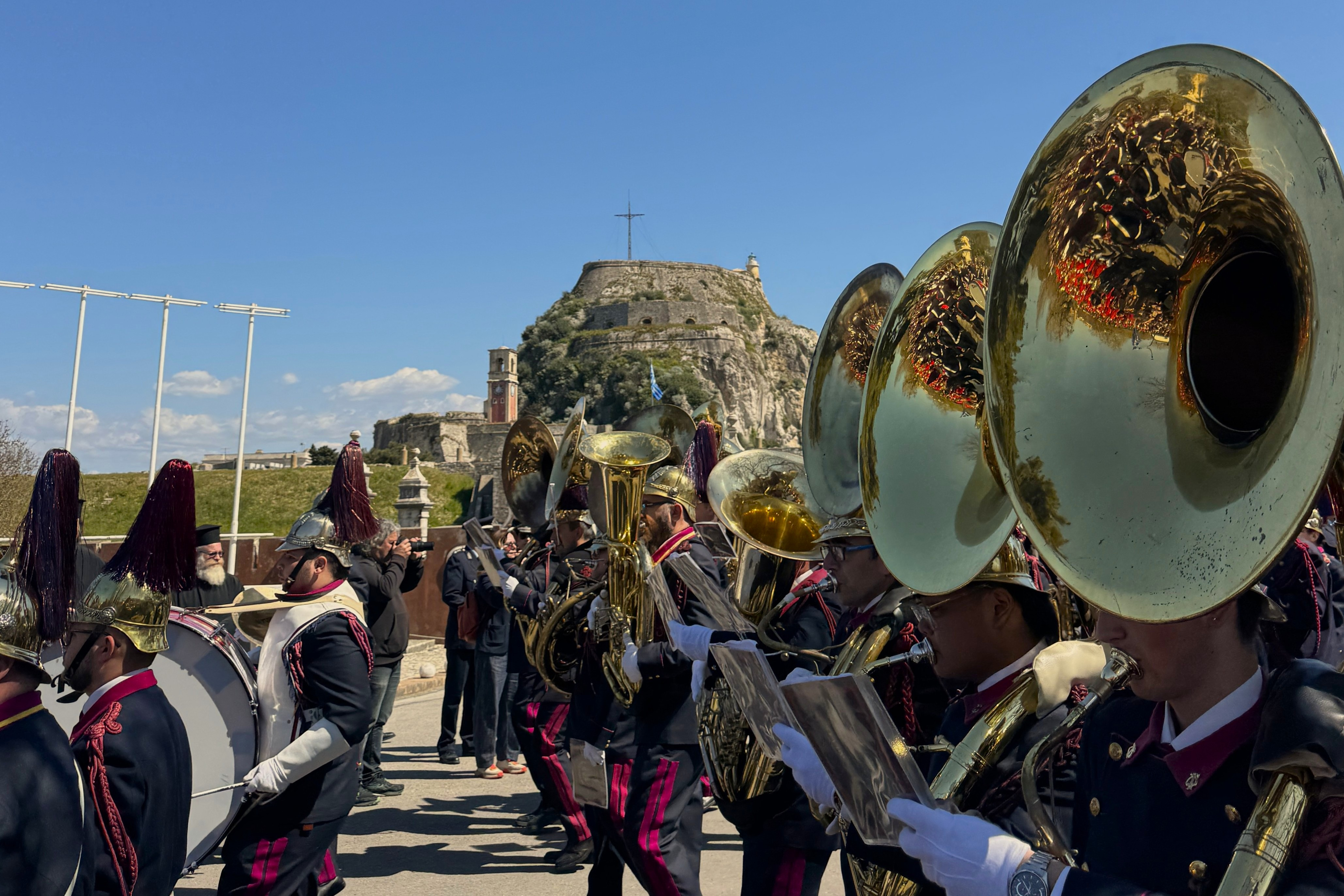
- The Old Philharmonic in front of the Old Fortress.
- Abbreviation: FEK
- Nickname: Palaia
- Formation: September 12, 1840
- Founder: Nikolaos Ch. Mantzaros
- Type: Philharmonic
- Purpose: Non-profit Educational Organization
- Location: Corfu, Greece
- President: Spyros Padovas
- Chief Musician: Spyros Prosoparis / Alkis Baltas
- Deputy Chief Musician: Spyros Kakarougas
- Awards: Award of National Beneficence (1975) by the Academy of Athens; Gold Medal (1980) of the City of Athens; Honorary Distinction (1998) by UNESCO; First performance of the Greek National Anthem (1864); First performance of the Olympic Anthem (1896)
- Website: fek.gr
- Colors: Maroon, Blue

The Philharmonic Society of Corfu (FEK), also known as the "Old Philharmonic", is a music-educational organization based in Corfu.

The Philharmonic Society of Corfu was founded on September 12, 1840, with the initial goal of becoming the first Greek music academy organized on European standards. The reason for its establishment was the prohibition by the British administration of the island of the participation of the British army band in Orthodox religious events—and particularly in the procession of the holy relic of Saint Spyridon, the patron saint of the island—due to the death of the King of the United Kingdom, William IV, in 1837. The new philharmonic was also known on the island by foreigners as "La Banda Grecca".

Its first Artistic Director was the composer Nikolaos Halikiopoulos Mantzaros, who retained this office until his death in 1872.

The Philharmonic had a fully organized teaching program in both the theory and practice of music. Its students, who for the first time in modern Greek history were able to learn music regardless of social class, had the opportunity to be taught by professional musicians and teachers basic music theory, harmony, counterpoint, morphology, orchestration, and composition. The FEK also has departments for choir, religious choir, strings, piano, Youth Band (Bantina), wind orchestra, brass quartet, chamber music, jazz orchestra, vocal department, and a Parade department.

The most popular of its musical ensembles, however, is its band, which first appeared in August 1841. This specific band was the one that performed the Greek National Anthem for the first time in 1864, composed by its director Nikolaos Mantzaros, as well as the Olympic Anthem in 1896. It became the fourth civilian band of the Ionian Islands after those of Zante (1816), Argostoli (1836) and Lixouri (1838) in Kefalonia.

Regarding the symphonic orchestra, it was only in 1907, as well as during the 1930s when the symphonic orchestra of the society performed in the Municipal Theatre of Corfu, to much critical acclaim. The symphonic orchestra made sporadic appearances until the early postwar years. Since 2003 the orchestra has again commenced its activities, as a result of the re-organization of the tuition of the string instruments within the Society.

The Philharmonic was initially housed in a building in Pinia, the old commercial center of the city of Corfu, while since 1900 it has been housed in a building that originally belonged to the Theotokis family.

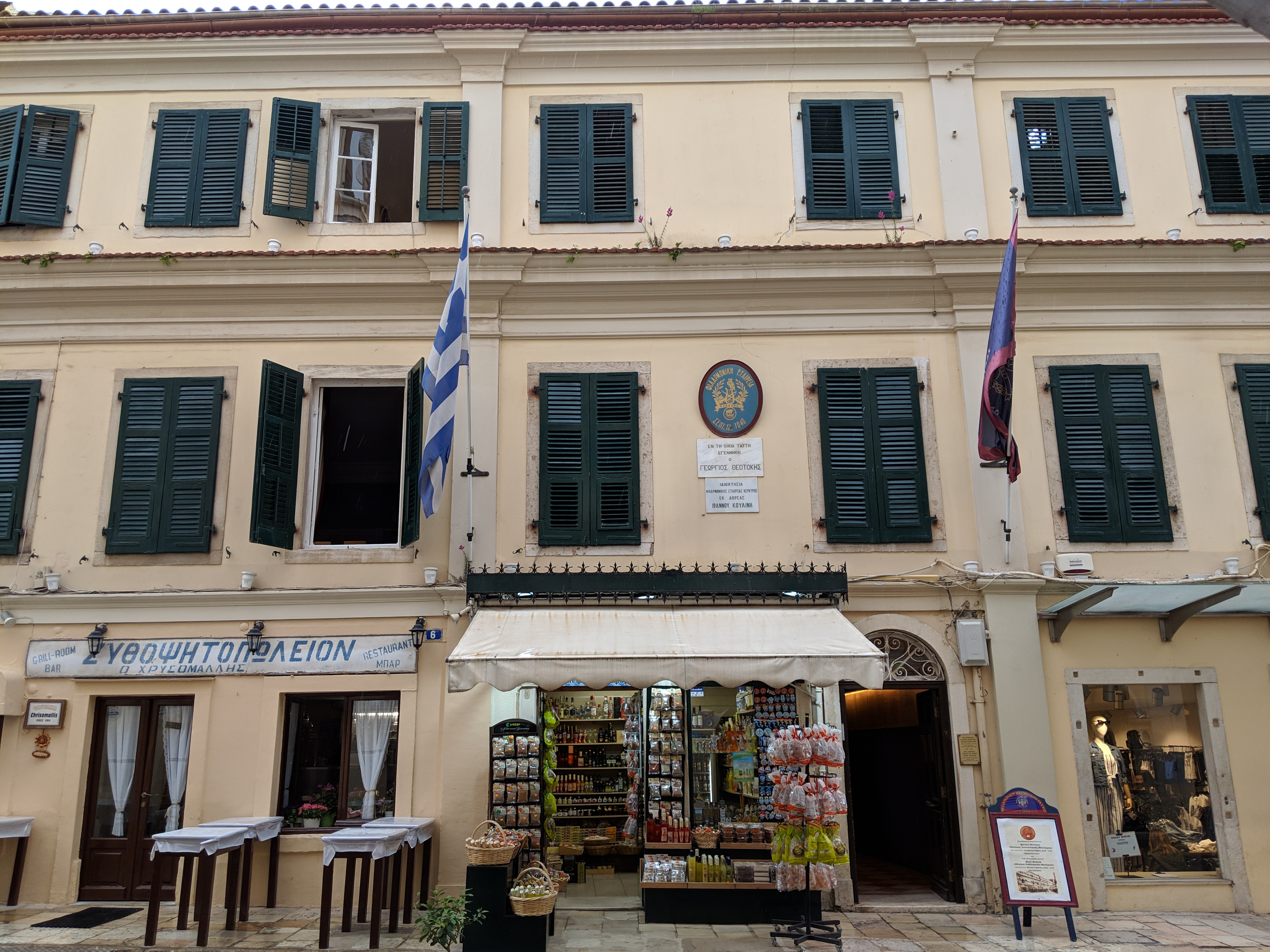
The building & museaum of the philharmonic.

== Music Museum "Nikolaos Chalikiopoulos Mantzaros" ==
The Museum of the Corfu Philharmonic Society occupies the first floor of the Society's building (Nikiforou Theotoki 10) and opened to the public on September 18, 2010. It documents the history of the institution and honours Nikolaos Halikiopoulos Mantzaros. It consists of five thematic sections:

1. Foundation, Administration, Organization: Features historical documents related to the Society's early days and organization.
2. Educational activities: Presents documents and artifacts related to the music pedagogy within the limits of the Society.
3. The concerts: The Philharmonic as a concert society for vocal and orchestral music.
4. The wind band: Documents, scores, instruments and artifacts related to the repertory and the activities of the Society's wind band.
5. The people and their work: Important composers and teachers. Scores by Spyridon Samaras (Spiro Samara), Pavlos Carrer (Paolo Carrer), the Liberali brothers, Spyridon Xyndas, Domenikos Padovanis, Dionissios Rodotheatos, Alexander Grek, Napoleon Lambelet, Andreas Seiler, as well as women composers from the Ionian Islands are exhibited in this section.

The Museum also organizes an annual circle of musicological lectures and has initiated a series of musicological publications.

The Philharmonic Society of Corfu, together with the Society of Corfiot Studies and the Reading Society of Corfu, also owns the Kapodistrias Museum following a 1979 donation by Maria Desylla-Kapodistria.

== Schools ==
- Instruments
- Choir
- Strings
- Piano
- Harmony
- Counterpoint
- Morphology
- Religious Choir
- Youth Band (Bantina)
- Band
- Wind Orchestra
- Jazz Department
- Vocal Department
- Parade Department

== Related Bibliography ==
- Kardamis Kostas, THE BANDS OF CORFU, MUSIC ON THE STREETS, Kaleidoscope pub. (2019)
- Kardamis Kostas, Six studies for the Philharmonic Society of Corfu, Philharmonic Society of Corfu pub. (2010)
- Motsenigos, Spyros: Modern Greek music: a contribution to its history (1958)
- N. Konomos, Nikolaos Mantzaros And Our National Anthem, (1958)
- S. Papageorgiou, The Affairs of the Philharmonic Society From Its Establishment Until Today 1840-1890, (1890).
