= Nobile Teatro di San Giacomo di Corfù =

Former theatre in Corfu, Greece

Coordinates: 39.6238°N 19.9222°E

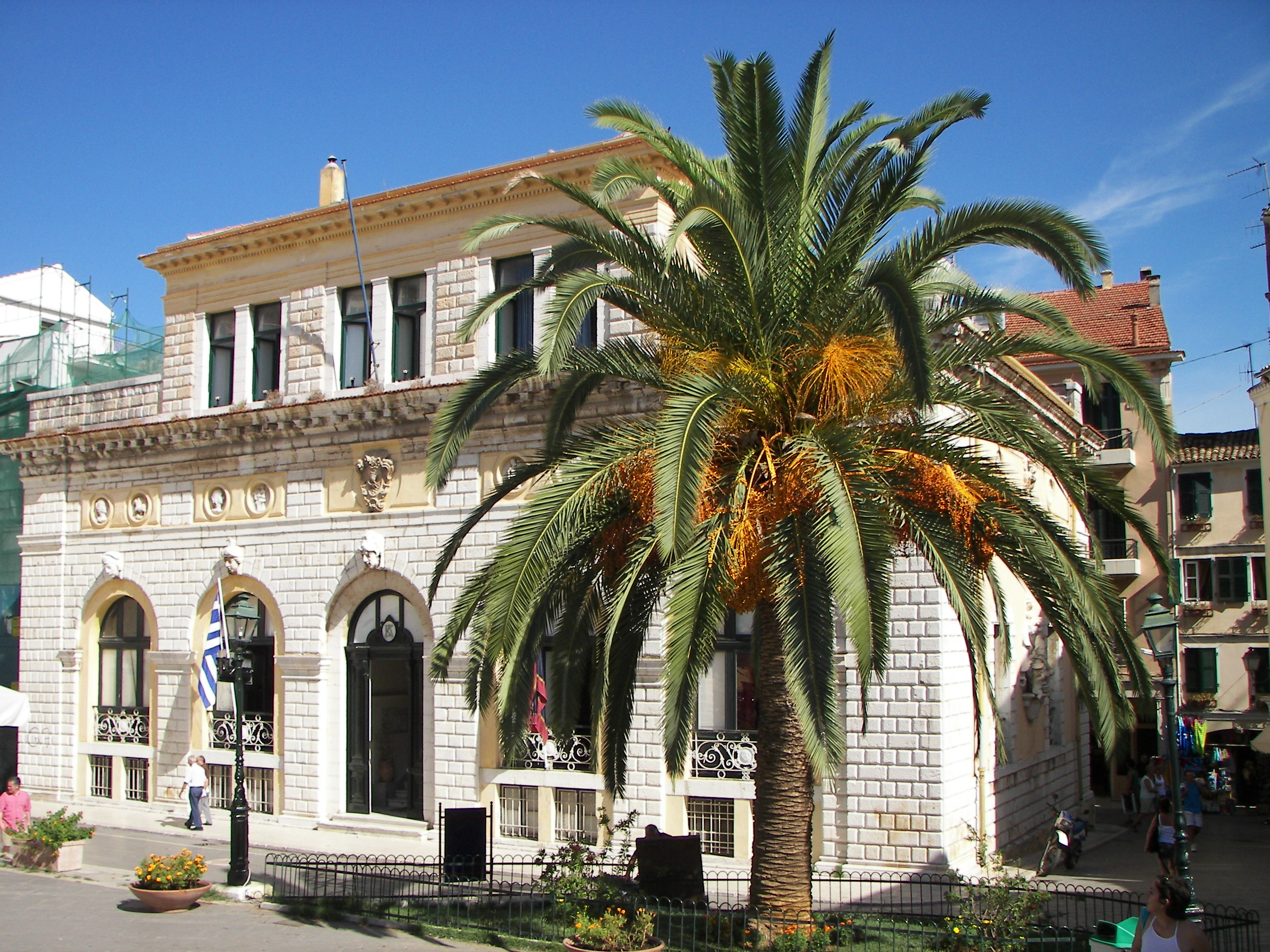
New Teatro di San Giacomo (now Corfu City Hall)

Nobile Teatro di San Giacomo di Corfù, Italian for The Noble Theatre of Saint James of Corfu, or simply Teatro di San Giacomo, was a theatre in Corfu, Greece which became the centre of Greek opera between 1733 and 1893. Despite its provincial origins it attracted Italian musicians and composers, many of whom became permanent residents of Corfu and contributed to the local music scene. The theatre acted as a catalyst in this cultural interaction and gave impetus to the development of the Ionian School of Music. Corfiot composer Nikolaos Halikiopoulos Mantzaros was a beneficiary of the synergy between the Italian and Corfiot musical traditions. The Theatre and its historical archives were destroyed during a German Luftwaffe bombing raid in 1943.

== History ==
Nobile Teatro di San Giacomo was named after a Catholic cathedral in Corfu. Established in 1693, during the Republic of Venice period, as a gathering place of the Venetian nobility of Corfu it was converted into a theatre in 1720 and became the first modern theatre to be established in Greece. Initially the theatre staged theatrical plays but in 1733 an opera was performed there for the first time. The opera was A. Aurelli’s Gerone, tiranno di Siracusa. The operas were continuously staged especially between 1771 and 1892 when the theatre was converted to a City Hall.

The Municipal Theatre of Corfu, which in early 20th century replaced the legendary Nobile Teatro di San Giacomo (which was converted into Town Hall). This photograph shows the theatre prior to the 1943 Luftwaffe bombardment and its subsequent destruction during World War II.

The musical tradition established by the theatre is especially important to the history of modern Greek music since it helped establish a Greek musical presence at a time when the Greek State did not even exist. The theatre staged the type of comic opera known as opera buffa which was less elaborate and therefore more economical than the full-fledged opera seria. San Giacomo's opera crews were mainly from southern Italy.

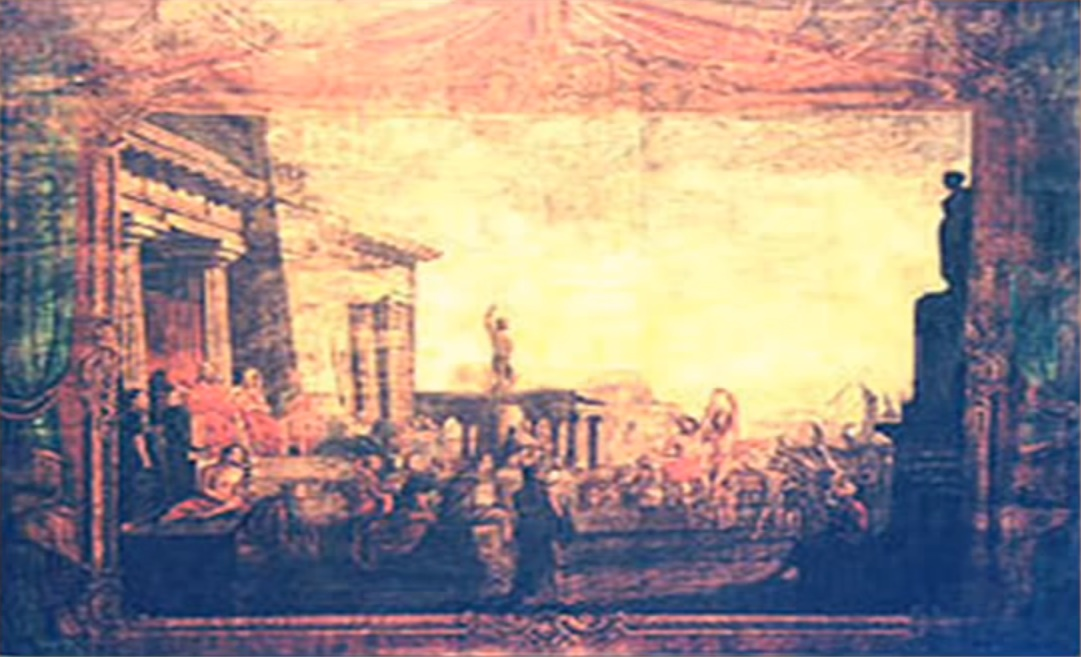
The historic stage curtain of Teatro di San Giacomo depicting a scene from the Odyssey

The opera house functioned during times of upheaval unabated as, for example, during the arrival of the French in 1797. In 1799, during the Russia-Ottoman siege, the theatre continued its performances even as the foreign opera troupe was unable to leave the island due to the blockade. The performance at such a challenging time was used as a means for propaganda and to raise the morale of the population.

The theatre attracted many Italian professional musicians who came to Corfu as teachers as well as composers and performers. This had the effect of generating an appreciation for music among the locals and this gradually led to the appearance of the first Corfiot music professionals who, in turn, became the first professional musicians of modern Greece. Corfiot Spyridon Xyndas, for example, wrote the Greek opera O ypopsifios (The Parliamentary Candidate) which became the first opera composed on an exclusively Greek libretto and was performed at San Giacomo in 1867.

The oral tradition held that operatic performers who found success at the theatre were distinguished with the accolade applaudito in Corfú ("applauded in Corfu") as a tribute to the discriminating musical taste of the island audience.

The theatre was replaced by the Municipal Theatre of Corfu in 1902.
