= Nikolaos Mantzaros =

Greek-Italian composer (1795–1872)

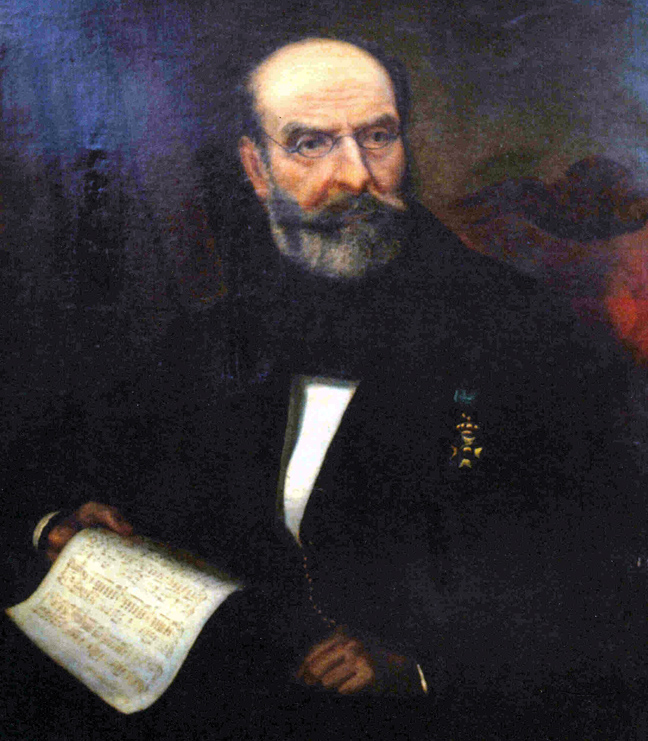
Nikolaos Halikiopoulos Mantzaros

Nikolaos Chalikiopoulos Mantzaros (Greek: Νικόλαος Χαλικιόπουλος Μάντζαρος [niˈkolaos xaliˈcopulos ˈmandzaros]; Italian: Niccoló Calichiopulo Manzaro; 26 October 1795 – 12 April 1872) was a Greek-Italian composer, born in Corfu. He was a major representative and founder of the so-called Ionian school of music (Επτανησιακή Σχολή).

Recent research and performances have led to a re-evaluation of Mantzaros as a significant composer and music theorist.

== Biography ==
Mantzaros was of noble Greco-Italian descent, coming from one of the most important and wealthy Venetian families of the "Libro d'Oro" di Corfu and therefore he never considered himself a "professional composer", teaching the youth of Corfu without profit. His father was Iakovos Chalikiopoulos Mantzaros and his mother Regina Turini, from Dalmatia.

He was taught music in his native city by the brothers Stefano (pianoforte) and Gerolamo Pojago (violin), Stefano Moretti from Ancona (music theory) and cavalliere Barbati, possibly a Neapolitan (music theory and composition). Mantzaros presented his first compositions (three concert or substitute arias and the one-act azione comica Don Crepuscolo) in 1815 in the theatre of San Giacomo of Corfu.

From 1819 onwards, he was regularly visiting Italy (Venice, Bologna, Milan, Naples), where, among others, he met the veteran Neapolitan composer Niccolo Antonio Zingarelli.

Mantzaros died in Corfu.

== Work ==
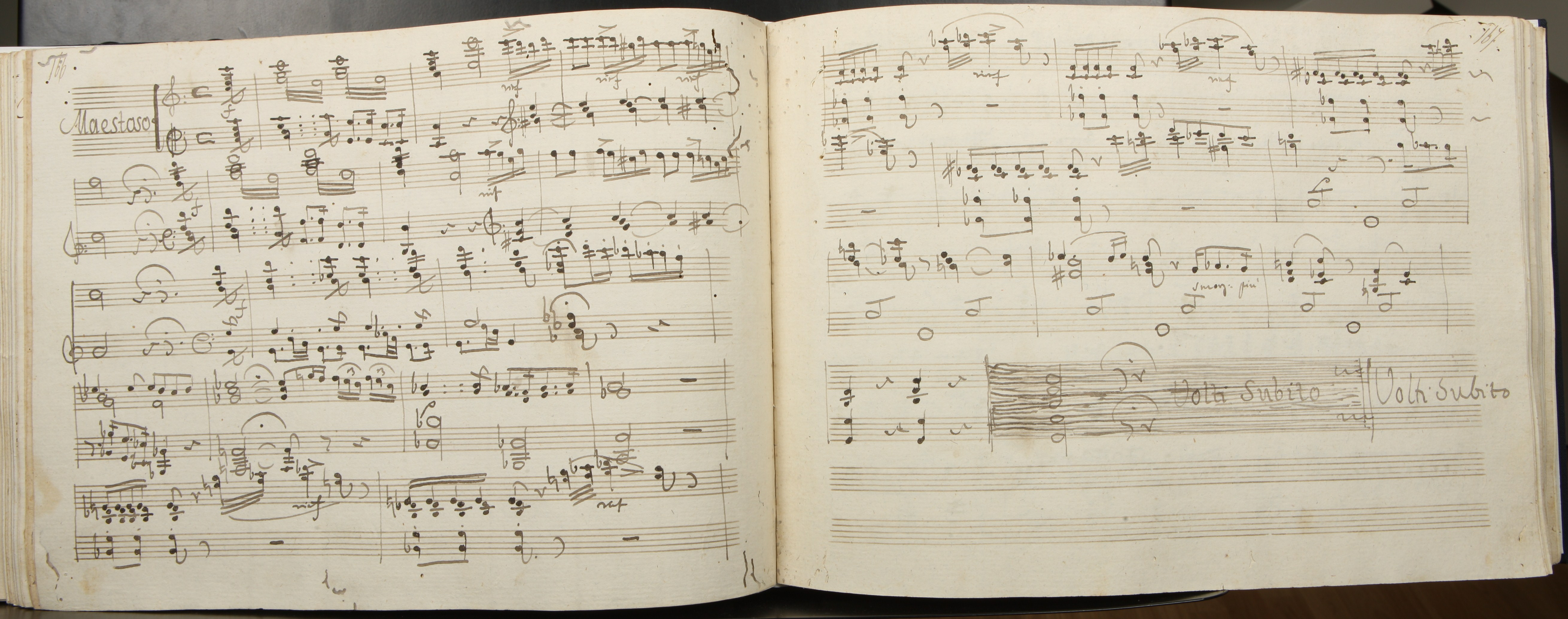
The initial pages of an 1820 piano 'Sinfonia' by Nikolaos Halikiopoulos Mantzaros (composer's autograph). It is exhibited in the Music Museum of the Philharmonic Society of Corfu.

His compositions include incidental music, vocal works in Italian and demotic Greek, sacred music for the Catholic Rite (three masses [possibly 1819, 1825, and possibly 1835], a Te Deum [1830]) and the Orthodox Church (notably, a complete mass based on the septinsular polyphonic traditional chanting [1834]), band music, instrumental music (24 piano sinfonie, some of them also for orchestra) etc. Mantzaros also composed the music for the first concert aria in Greek in 1827, the Aria Greca.

Mantzaros was an important music theorist, contrapuntist and teacher. From 1841 and until his death he was the artistic director of the Philharmonic Society of Corfu.

=== Greek national anthem ===
His most popular composition remains the musical setting for the poem of Dionysios Solomos' Ýmnos eis tīn Eleutherían (Hymn to Liberty), which Mantzaros added to Solomos' poem in 1828. The first and second stanzas were adopted initially in 1864 as the Royal Anthem of Greece and on 28 June 1865 as the Greek national anthem. However, recent research and performances have proved that Mantzaros had broader activities as a significant composer and music theorist, which go beyond the established perception of him as the mere composer of the National Anthem.

== Recordings ==
- Mantzaros-Solomos: The Hymn to the Liberty (Lyra, CD0064, 1991)
- Music of the Ionian School. N.Mantzaros, N.Lambelet, P.Carrer (Motivo, NM1049, 1996). The 'Nikolaos Mantzaros Chamber Music Ensemble' performing arrangements from piano Sinfonias by Mantzaros.
- Nikolaos Halikiopoulos Mantzaros (1795-1872): Early Works for voice and orchestra (1815-1827) (Ionian University / Music Department, IUP005, 2005)
- Don Crepuscolo performed by Christophoros Stamboglis, George Petrou and Armonia Atenea (Athens Camerata) in the CD Georg Friedrich Haendel, Alessando Severo / Niccolo Manzaro, Don Crepuscolo (MDG 609 1674-2, 2011)
- Niccolo Calichiopulo Manzaro - Fedele Fenaroli, Partimenti for String Instruments performed by Ionian String Quartet (Irida Classics 009, 2011)

== See also ==
- Antonios Liveralis
