= List of Greek musical artists =

This is a list of Greek singers and groups with articles on Wikipedia. Note that it may never be complete.

== A ==
- Adiexodo
- Nancy Alexiadi
- Haris Alexiou
- Dol Ammad
- Antique
- Thomai Apergi
- Annet Artani
- Eleftheria Arvanitaki
- Astarte

== B ==
- Ble

== C ==
- Maria Callas
- C:Real
- Chryspa
- Costa Cordalis
- Costadinos Contostavlos
- Tula Contostavlos

== D ==
- George Dalaras
- Christos Dantis
- Dephosphorus
- Deus Ex Machina
- Angela Dimitriou
- Stratos Dionysiou
- Natalia Doussopoulos

== E ==
- Eleftheria Eleftheriou
- Epikouri
- Evi Hassapides Watson
- Evridiki
- Ciem

== F ==
- FF.C
- Firewind
- Eleni Foureira
- Fragile Vastness
- Mario Frangoulis

== G ==
- Diamanda Galas
- Nikos Ganos
- Keti Garbi
- Genia Tou Chaous
- Glykeria
- Nikos Gounaris

== H ==
- Sevas Hanum
- Betty Harlafti
- Michalis Hatzigiannis
- Hi-5

== I ==
- Iasos
- Imiskoumbria
- In Trance 95

== K ==
- Kalomira
- Katrin the Thrill
- Giorgos Karadimos
- Nikos Karvelas
- Kelly Kelekidou
- Klavdia
- Elli Kokkinou
- Kore. Ydro.
- Stamatis Kraounakis
- Diafana Krina

== L ==
- Labis Livieratos
- Vicky Leandros
- Locomondo

== M ==
- Nana Mouskouri
- Lavrentis Machairitsas
- Dionysis Makris
- Popi Maliotaki
- Manto
- Marina and the Diamonds
- Marinella
- Marsheaux
- Kostas Martakis
- Matisse
- Giorgos Mazonakis
- Memorain
- Melina Mercouri
- Eirini Merkouri
- Nikos Mihas
- Mikro
- Takis Mousafiris
- Mode Plagal
- Mazoo & The Zoo
- Marina Satti

== N ==
- Necromantia
- Nightfall
- Nino

== O ==
- ONAR
- One
- Onirama
- On Thorns I Lay

== P ==
- Lefteris Pantazis
- Giorgos Papadopoulos
- Elena Paparizou
- Giannis Parios
- Giorgos Perris
- Thanos Petrelis
- Phase
- Marianda Pieridi
- Filippos Pliatsikas
- Giannis Ploutarxos
- Pyx Lax
- Klavdia Papadopoulou
- Angela Papazoglou

== R ==
- Raining Pleasure
- Anna Rezan
- Antonis Remos
- Rotting Christ
- Demis Roussos

== S ==
- Sabrina
- Sarah P.
- Sarbel
- Secret Band
- Septic Flesh
- Notis Sfakianakis
- Sirusho
- Socrates Drank the Conium
- Xylina Spathia
- Stereo Mike
- Stereo Nova

== T ==
- Tamta
- Paschalis Terzis
- Turabi
- Thalassa
- The Earthbound
- The Last Drive
- Natasa Theodoridou
- Efi Thodi
- Thou Art Lord
- Trypes
- Theta (musician)

== V ==
- Vangelis
- Despina Vandi
- Nikos Vertis
- Anna Vissi

== W ==
- Wastefall

== Y ==
- Savina Yannatou
- Ypogeia Revmata

== X ==
- Iannis Xenakis

== Z ==
- Peggy Zina
- Apostolia Zoi

== See also ==
- List of Greeks
- Lists of musicians
