= Street Mode Festival =

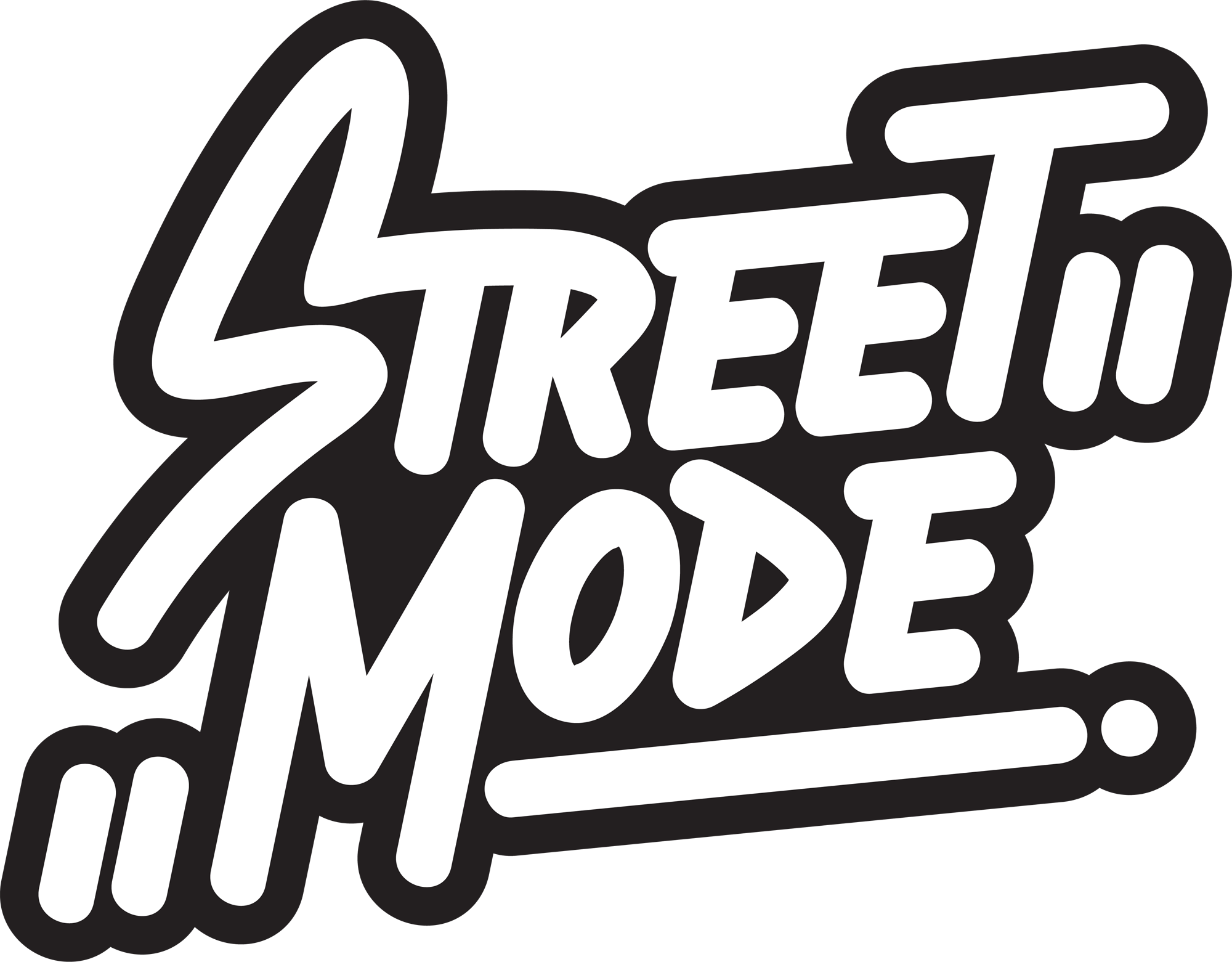
- Genre: Hip-hop, punk rock, stoner, reggae, indie, street art, street dance, extreme sports
- Location: Thessaloniki
- Years active: 2009–present
- Website: streetmode.gr

Street Mode Festival is an annual music, art and sports festival held in Thessaloniki since 2009. It is the largest festival of its kind, in Greece, reaching thousands of visitors, with a program that includes lots of musical stages and street culture events.

Street Mode Festival initially began as a series of events taking place in open – public spaces, such as the square of Thermi and the port of Thessaloniki, with a vision of presenting all the elements of “street” culture in one celebration. In the informal but widespread term “street culture” we define the subculture that is developing mainly in urban areas, and is expressed through art forms such as graffiti and breakdance, through sports such as BMX and parkour and through music genres such as hip-hop, rock and ethnic.

== History ==
The first Street Mode Festival was organized in September 2009 in the Central Square of Thermi, a suburb in Thessaloniki, Greece. The event was conceptualized, organized and produced by Giannis Efstathiou (a.k.a. Nox1), and during its first year it offered a graffiti jam, a skate contest, and a live musical performance by “Vodka Juniors”. During the next years, a big amount of bands was added to the program, along with new events such as street dance battles and parkour jams. The Central square of Thermi remained the venue of the festival for 5 years, from 2009 to 2013, where artists from all over Greece were invited to perform in front of the constantly growing audience.

In 2014, the festival moved to a bigger venue, Pier A & Warehouse C at the port area of Thessaloniki. The addition of the reggae icon “Alpha Blondie” and the legendary hip-hop band “Sugar Hill Gang” to Street Mode 2016 signaled the first international entries to the festival’s musical line-up. Numerous internationally acclaimed acts additions followed the next years such as Ska-P, New Model Army, Turbonegro, Phil Campbell, Max Romeo, Pussy Riot, Looptroop Rockers and Dubioza Kolektiv.

The year 2017 was a turning point in the history of the festival, as it moved to a bigger venue (FIX Open-Air Multiplex in Thessaloniki) giving space to more than 80 bands from all over the world to perform in 5 stages during a 3-day long program. The significant increase in not only the amount but also the variety in musical acts and other events since 2016, contributed to shape a new character to the festival and from that point and on, Street Mode established a reputation as a major-type festival. In 2019, it moved back to the port area of Thessaloniki, but this time at Pier B & Warehouse 8. In 2022, after 2 years of absence due to the covid-19 pandemic, Street Mode Festival returned in Thermi, in a brand new venue called Sonik Arena.

== Artists ==
The following artists have appeared in Street Mode Festival.

International Music Artists (A-Z)

4Questions (BG), Algiers (USA), Alpha Blondy & The Solar System (IC), Art Brut (UK), Asian Dub Foundation Soundsystem (UK), Balothizer (UK & GR), Che Sudaka (ESP), City Of The Sun (USA), Conquering Lion (MKD), Delinquent Habits (USA), DJ Krush (JPN), Dog Eat Dog (USA), Doll Skin (USA), Dope D.O.D. (NL), Dub Inc (FR), Dub Pistols (UK), Dubioza Kolektiv (B&H), Dwarves (USA), Electric Six (USA), Fun Lovin' Criminals (USA), Fuzztones, The (USA), Gang Of Four (UK), Godfathers, The (UK), Great Malarkey, The (UK), Green Lung (UK), Herbaliser Soundsystem, The (UK), Jaya The Cat (NL), Kalamata (GER), King Blues, The (UK), L’Entourloop (FRA), Lionize (USA), Looptroop Rockers (SWE), Marky Ramone's Blitzkrieg (USA), Max Romeo (JAM), Monkey3 (SUI), Moscow Death Brigade (RUS), My Sleeping Karma (GER), Nebula (USA), New Model Army (UK), Nick Oliveri’s Death Electric Band (USA), Nova Twins (UK), Ocean Wisdom (UK), Oferta Especial (ESP), Pe4enkata (BG), Perkele (SWE), Phil Campbell & The Bastard Sons (UK), Prop Dylan (SWE), Punkreas (IT), Pussy Riot (RUS), Raketkanon (BEL), Repetitor (SRB), Replicunts (SRB), Roadkillsoda (RO), Rumjacks, The (AUS), Samsara Blues Experiment (GER), Satanic Surfers (SWE), Senser (UK), Shahmen (USA), Ska-P (ESP), Skiller (BG), Skints, The (UK), Somali Yacht Club (UKR), Soulside (USA), Stoned Jesus (UKR), Subcarpați (RO), Sugar Hill Gang, The (USA), Superhiks (MKD), Taiwan MC (FRA), Talco (IT), Tdk (BG), Therapy? (UK), Thundermother (SWE), Too Many T’s (UK), Tortuga (PL), Turbonegro (NOR), Warrior Soul (USA), Yawning Man (USA), Zion Train (UK).

National Music Artists (A-Z)

1000mods, 63 High, Above The Hood, Allergic, Anima Nation, Anser, Arrow, Bad Movies, Baildsa, Bailemos, Bangies, Banksters, Bazooka, Beggars, Big Nose Attack, Blend Mishkin & Roots Evolution, Bloody Hawk, Bonzai, Bunta Planedo, Buzz, Chasing Attractors, Chipper, Complex, Coretheband, Coyote’s Arrow, Dani Gambino, Deaf Radio, Despite Everything, Dirty Fuse, DWMND, Embargo, Eversor, Expe, Fer De Lance, Folk ‘n’ Roll, Fuel Eater, Fundracar, Godsleep, Halocraft, Hatemost, Imitate Your Mother, Immune, Iratus, Jaw Bones, Joker / Two-Face, Junkheart, Kareem Kalokoh, Kepe, Koza Mostra, Locomondo, Long Three, M.A.t.E, Mpelafon, Muddy Vibez, My Endless Winter, Naxatras, Nightstalker, Noise Figures, Nume, Oceandvst, Oldschool Rednex, Overpower, Panx Romana, Personality Crisis, Planet Of Zeus, Professional Sinnerz, Project Theory, Puta Volcano, Rack, RNS, Roundlights, Saske, SKG’s Dub Alliance, Sleepin Pillow, Social Waste, Solmeister, The Last Drive, The Reverend Beasts, Tiny Jackal, Trouf, Tuber, Twinsanity, Villagers Οf Ioannina City, Vlospa, Vodka Juniors, Void Droid, Wang, Wish Upon A Star, WNC, Zoro, 12oς Πίθηκος, Άγνωστος Χειμώνας, Άλλος Κόσμος, Αντίποινα, Αρνάκια, Βέβηλος, Βήτα Πεις, Γιάννης Αγγελάκας & 100°C, Εισβολέας, Ευθύμης, Ζήνων, Ημισκούμπρια, Θραξ Πανκc, Θύτης, Κακό Συναπάντημα, Κανών, Καταχθόνιος, Κοινοί Θνητοί, Κόμης X, Κροταλίας, Λεξ, Λευκή Συμφωνία, Λόγος Τιμής, Λόκο, Μέμφις, Μη Άσματα, Μιθριδάτης, Μικρός Κλέφτης, Νέγρος Του Μοριά, Πάνος Φραγκιαδάκης, Παύλος Παυλίδης & Hotel Alaska, Πελίνα, Στέλιος Σαλβαδόρ – Μωρά Στην Φωτιά, Στίχοιμα, Ταφ Λάθος, Τζαμάλ, Φι Βήτα Σίγμα, Χατ Τρικ, Χατζηφραγκέτα, Χι Ταφ Πι.

Side Events Performers & Artists

More than 500 artists from Greece and abroad have participated in the festival's side events (graffiti, street art, breaking, street dance, parkour, freerunning, skateboarding & BMX).
