= Earthbound =

Earthbound may refer to:

== Video games ==
- Mother (video game series), known as EarthBound outside Japan, series of diverse role-playing video games
  - Mother, known as EarthBound Beginnings outside Japan, 1989 role-playing game for the Family Computer
  - EarthBound, 1994 role-playing video game for the Super Nintendo Entertainment System

== Media ==
- Earthbound (1920 film), from a story by Basil King
- Earthbound (1940 film), starring Andrea Leeds
- Earthbound (1981 film), a science fiction comedy starring Burl Ives
- A Little Bit of Heaven (2011 film), formerly Earthbound
- Earthbound (TV series), a Canadian current affairs television series
- "Earthbound" (Space: 1999), an episode of the television series Space: 1999

== Books ==
- Earthbound (novel), a 1982 novel by Richard Matheson
- Earthbound, the third novel in the Marsbound trilogy by Joe Haldeman

== Music ==
- Earthbound, was a Swedish trance group 1994-2003.
- The Earthbound, a Greek band
- Earthbound (Bury Tomorrow album), 2016
- Earthbound (Conner Reeves album), 1997
- Earthbound (The 5th Dimension album), 1975
- Earthbound (King Crimson album), 1972
- Earthbound (Sophie Barker album), 2005
- Earthbound, a 1998 album by Billy Mann
- Earthbound, a 1993 album by the Rocket Scientists
- Earthbound (EP), a 2009 EP by To-Mera
- Earthbound (song), a 2003 song by Rodney Crowell
