= Greek punk =

Music genre or scene

- Stylistic origins: Punk rock; proto-punk; hard rock; anarcho-punk
- Cultural origins: 1980s, Greece

Regional scenes
- Greece

The Greek punk (Greek: Ελληνική πάνκ, pronounced [eliniˈki ˈpank]) scene was small but powerful in the Greek capital, Athens, in the 1980s. Bands such as Adiexodo (Dead end), Genia Tou Chaous (Chaos generation), Stress, Panx Romana, Ex-humans, Anti (Contra) functioned as a bunch of related bands, who gave concerts together, in the same locations. Like elsewhere, punk attitude has been loosely used by various individuals, but most of the time the key element was the youthful anger and the provocative anti-establishment attitude.

Many newer crust and hardcore punk bands such as Ksehasmeni Profitia (Gr:ξεχασμένη προφητεία) (Forgotten prophecy), Naftia (Nausea), Deus Ex Machina and others of the 1990s followed DIY ethics, gradually forming a small but powerful network in most big Greek cities. This network has sometimes been linked with local anarchist-related groups, squats, cultural/social/left-wing centers. Most of the concerts of punk bands in Greece have no, or minimal, entrance fee and many of them are arranged according to DIY ethics.

Contemporary punk bands have seldom managed to form a solid scene outside that DIY / anarchopunk movement, but sometimes a band might attract an enthusiastic core of dedicated fans, such as in the Oi! or streetpunk subgenres. Few attempts have been made to document information about Greek punk; one of those being a limited edition brochure of Anarchist Library (Anarhiki Vivliothiki). Some Greek webzines have also documented Greek punk history.

== Notable Bands ==
- Deus Ex Machina
- Panx Romana
- Genia Tou Chaous
- Adiexodo
- Thrax Punks
- Naftia

== See also ==
- Greek rock
