= Robert Sin =

Greek singer and songwriter

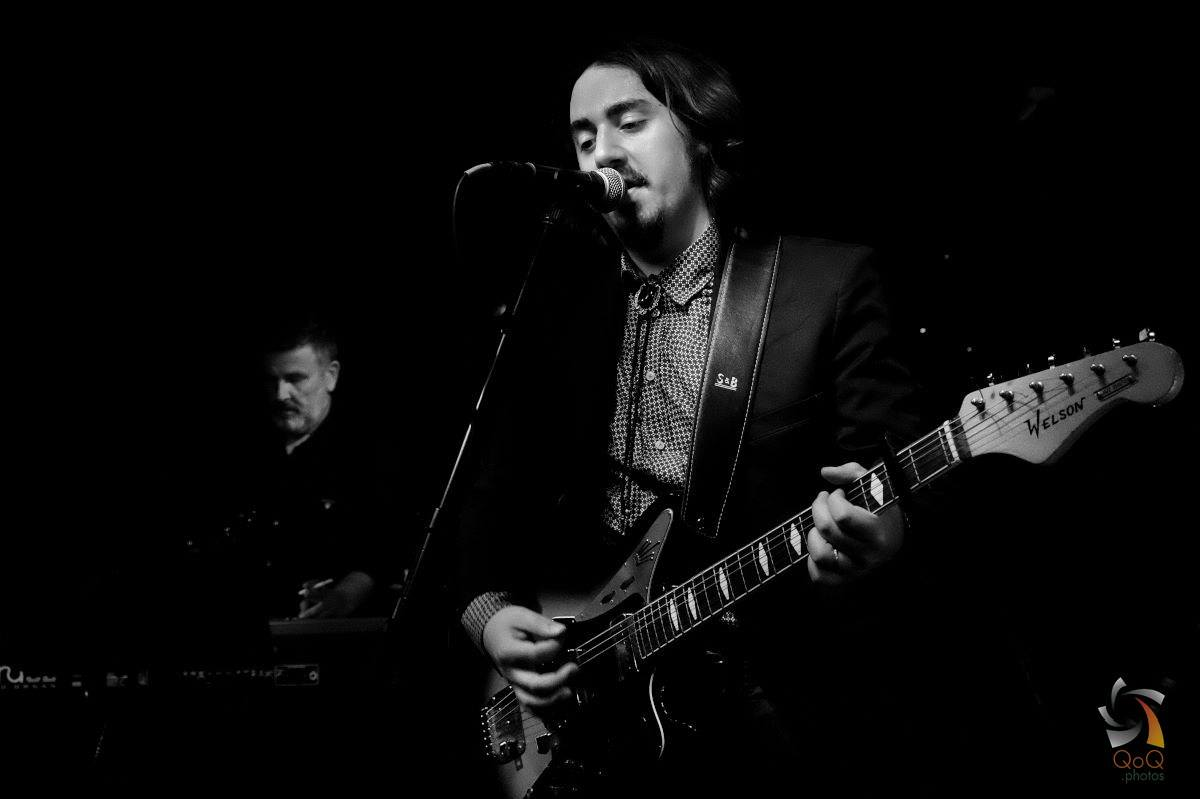

Background information
- Born: January 14, 1993 (age 33); Arta, Greece
- Genres: Americana, Alt-Country, Rock
- Occupation: Singer/songwriter
- Instruments: Electric guitar, acoustic guitar, piano, bass guitar, harmonica

Robert Sin (born 14 January 1993) is a Greek singer and songwriter.

== Biography ==
Robert Sin was born and raised in Arta, Greece. He started playing the piano at age six and later he picked up the guitar. He started writing songs and recording them in his bedroom studio at age 14.

=== Robert Sin and The Sinners ===
Robert Sin & The Sinners live @ After Dark

In 2013, Sin recorded his first EP "Death & Other Misdemeanors" with friends and members of a Greek underground rock band known as "The Sinners". The EP was released in 2014 in digital form.

Vassilis Bas Athanassiadis played the guitar (el:No Man's Land, Terrapin), George Papageorgiadis the bass (No Man's Land, Terrapin), Evi Hassapides Watson sang some backing vocals (No Man's Land, el:Echo Tattoo, She Tames Chaos), Panos Kourtsounis Ganas played the lead guitar in the song "Stella" (Echo Tattoo, Apagorevmeno Dassos), George Tzivas (Terrapin) and Agis Gritzios-Fouskas (Hungry Dukes) played the drums and Stavros Parginos (Opera Chaotique) the cello on "Stella" and Robert Sin played the guitar, keyboards and sang the songs. Dimitris Misirlis recorded and mixed the record at Matrix Studios Athens. .

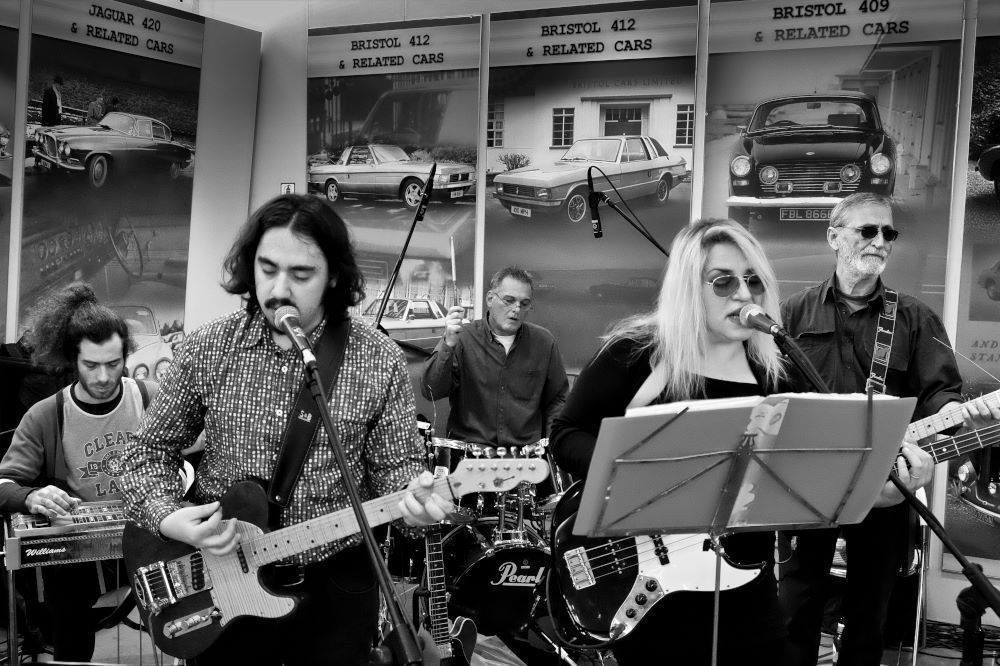

=== Robert Sin and The Huckleberries ===
In 2014, Sin moved to Athens, where he played some solo shows and joined a band named "She Tames Chaos" as a guitar player.

In January 2015, he created a new band "The Huckleberries". The band consisted of Stelios Habipis on guitar and Dimitris Bouroussas on drums, both known for playing in the underground Greek band Libido Blume, Thodoris "Theo" Karampalis on keys, Evi Hassapides Watson (the lead singer of No Man's Land, Echo Tattoo and She Tames Chaos) on bass and Sin on vocals and guitars.

The band went into the studio in June 2015 and recorded some songs with the help of recording engineer Kostis Raisis. The album was mixed by Sin. These songs released in April 2016 on CD in collaboration with G.O.D. Records. The album is called "… And The Ghosts In Between"..

Sin and the Huckleberries released their second album in March 2019. The album is called "Dot On The Map" and was to be the last "Huckleberries" album.

=== Robert Sin and The Conspiracy Of The Equality ===
Soon after the Huckleberries split up, Robert Sin started performing live and making plans for a new record with a new band "The Conspiracy Of The Equality". Among his constant collaborators Thodoris "Theo" Karampalis on keys and Evi Hassapides Watson on bass guitar the band joined Kostas Sidirokastritis on electric guitar and Nikolas Mamasis on drums. The COVID-19 pandemic postponed any plans for live performances and recordings for quite some time. On the 6th of July, 2023, the band went into AstroStudio to record "Inward The Course Of The Empire Takes Its Way". On drums Nikos Sidirokastritis had taken Nikolas's place. The album came out on the 15th of February, 2025

== Discography ==
- 2014 - Death & Other Misdemeanors (EP)
- 2016 - ... And The Ghosts in Between
- 2019 - Dot on the Map
- 2025 - Inward The Course Of The Empire Takes Its Way
