= Socrates Drank the Conium (album) =

Studio album by Socrates Drank The Conium
- Released: 1971
- Genre: Hard rock Psychedelic rock Blues-rock
- Length: 36:41
- Label: Polygram

Socrates Drank The Conium chronology
| Socrates Drank the Conium (1971) | Taste of Conium (1973) |

Socrates Drank the Conium was the 1971 debut album of the Greek rock band of the same name. It has more psychedelic- and blues-influenced tracks than their following albums. The work on this album is similar to that of musicians like Jimi Hendrix and Eric Clapton.

== Track listing ==
All songs credited to Spathas and Tourkogiorgis; other collaborators are noted.

1. "Live In The Country" — 3:43
2. "Something In The Air" (D. Wood) — 3:21
3. "Bad Conditions" — 3:59
4. "It's A Disgusting World" (Boukouvalas) — 6:52
5. "Close The Door And Lay Down" — 3:12
6. "Blind Illusion" — 3:33
7. "Hoo Yeah!" — 3:36
8. "Underground" (D. Wood) — 4:40
9. "Starvation" — 3:45

== Sources ==
- Socrates Drank the Conium at AllMusic. Retrieved 2012-04-20.
