= On the Wings =

On The Wings

Studio album by Socrates Drank The Conium
- Released: 1973
- Studio: Polysound Studios
- Genre: Hard rock Blues-rock; Progressive rock
- Length: 33:29
- Label: Polygram
- Producer: Costas Phasolas

Socrates Drank The Conium chronology
Taste of Conium (1972)	On The Wings (1973)	Phos (1974)

On The Wings was a 1973 album released by Socrates Drank The Conium. It features a heavier sound than the previous records, reminiscent of that of 70s bands such as Led Zeppelin and progressive Black Sabbath. They did not lose their blues roots, however, as evidenced by such tracks as "This Is The Rats".

For the recording of this album, Socrates Drank The Conium recruited a second guitarist in addition to Yannis Spathas. His name was Gus Doukakis.

== Track listing ==
- All songs written by Yannis Spathas, Antonis Tourkoylorgis and Gus Doukakis, except where noted.
1. "Who Is To Blame" — 3:47
2. "Distruction"[sic] — 4:32 (Spathas, Tourkoylorgis, Doukakis, Giorgos Tradalidis)
3. "Naked Trees" — 5:00
4. "Death Is Gonna Die" — 3:33
5. "This Is The Rats" — 2:49 (Spathas, Tourkoylorgis, Doukakis, Tradalidis)
6. "Lovesick Kid's Blues" — 2:50
7. "On The Wings Of Death" — 3:25
8. "Breakdown" — 3:04
9. "Triping In A Crystal Forest"[sic] — 1:49 (Spathas, Doukakis)
10. "Regulations (If I Were A President)" — 2:40

== Sources ==
- Socrates Drank the Conium discography - RYM/Sonemic
- On the Wings at AllMusic. Retrieved 2012-04-20.
- [ rock/pop (prog rock) titles at Aquarius Records]
