= Tonino Carotone =

Spanish singer-songwriter

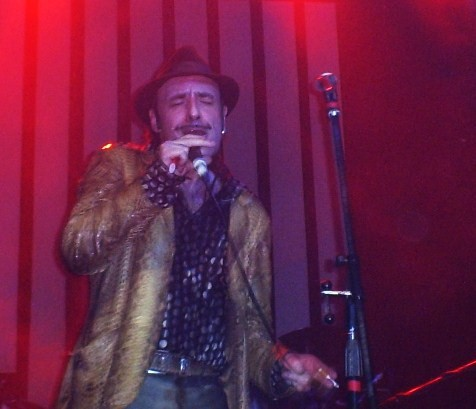
- Carotone performing on 13 December 2007

Background information
- Born: Antonio de la Cuesta; 9 January 1970 (age 56); Burgos, Spain
- Occupation: Musician
- Instrument: Vocals
- Labels: Virgin, Bloom Produzioni
- Website: Official Website (in Italian)

Tonino Carotone (born Antonio de la Cuesta, 9 January 1970) is a Spanish singer-songwriter. His stage name "Tonino Carotone", (based on the Italian word 'carota' that means 'carrot', is inspired by his great idol, the Italian pop pianist and singer Renato Carosone. The majority of his childhood and adolescence were spent in Pamplona, Spain. In 1995, Tonino moved to Italy, where he gained success five years later after releasing the single Me cago en el amor (a slang idiom from Spain meaning "I curse love", but literally translatable as "I shit on love") from his debut album Mondo difficile ("Difficult World"). In 2003, Tonino released another album, Senza Ritorno ("With No Return").

== Discography ==
=== Albums ===
- Ciao Mortali ("Hello Mortals") (Bloom Produzioni, 2008)
- Senza Ritorno (Virgin, 2003)
- Mondo Difficile (Virgin, 1999)

=== Singles ===
- Me Cago en el Amor (Virgin, 1999)

=== Collaborations ===
- La Mulata – Locomondo (2017)
- La Radiolina – Manu Chao (Virgin, 2007)
- Bahia Sound System – Compilation (2006)
- Malacabeza – Arpioni (Alternative, 2005)
- Buona Mista Social Ska! – Arpioni (Gridalo Forte Records, 2001)
- Los Guachos – Karamelo Santo (Benditas Producciones, 2001)
- Fuerza Volume 1 – Compilation (Virgin, 2000)
- Peret Rey de la Rumba – Compilation (Virgin, 2000)

== Other works ==
Tonino Carotone and Manu Chao performed the theme song for Drew Carey's Green Screen Show, titled La Trampa.

In 2006, Tonino and writer Federico Traversa released a book titled Il Maestro dell'Ora Brava.

Previous to his solo work, Tonino formed part of the Pamplona based group Kojón Prieto y los Huajolotes, gaining a moderate following before disbanding in 1995.

== Bibliography ==
- Tonino Carotone & Federico Traversa, Il Maestro dell'ora Brava, Genova, Chinaski Edizioni, 2006 (ISBN 8889966025)
