= Adiexodo =

Greek punk band

Adiexodo (Greek: Αδιέξοδο; Greek for "Dead End") was a Greek punk band from Athens formed in 1983 by Dimitris Spyropoulos, Sotiris Theocharis, Stathis Papandreou, Thim Geo and Mimis Alimprantis. It was one of the first Greek punk bands, along with Genia Tou Chaous, and its raw low fidelity sound along with its nihilistic lyrics were very influential to the early regional punk scene and subculture.

The band members broke up in 1986 and Spyropoulos went on to form Deus ex Machina.

== Discography ==
- Η Γενιά του Χάους και το Αδιέξοδο σας εύχονται Καλή Όρεξη (1984 split tape – Art Νouveau)
- Διατάραξη κοινής ησυχίας (Disruption of public peace) (1984 Compilation album – Enigma records)
- Η Γενιά του Χάους και το Αδιέξοδο σας εύχονται Καλό Πάσχα (1985 split tape, live at Agrinio)
- Αδιέξοδο/Απόγνωση (Dead End/Despair) (1985 split demo)
- 38 χιλιοστά (38 millimeters) (1986 LP – Enigma records)
