= Naftia =

Greek punk band

Naftia (Ναυτία, Greek for Nausea) was a Greek punk band from Thessaloniki formed in 1988. They were one of the most prominent bands of the early emerging hardcore and crust punk scene in Greece. Some key elements of their sound include dual male and female vocals, along with a heavy metal influenced sound and politically charged lyrics related to anarchist ideals, as a form of radical political commentary and criticism against state authority and occurring political structures and themes of the time related to neoliberalism.

In September 1993 the band split up, playing their last planned gig in Thessaloniki.

== Discography ==
- Sex Drugs and Greek Salad - (1988 - live in Oslo)
- Sweet Secret of Life - (1989 - demo)
- European Alienaissance - (1992 - LP)
- Naytia Kinky Horror Show (1994 - split LP. with Graue Zellen)

== Members ==
- Members: Sonia Vlachou (Vocals, Drums)
- Vaggelis Filaitis (Vocals, Bass)
- Ntinos Zoumperis (Vocals, Guitar)
- Christos Danis (Vocals, Guitar)
- Giannis "Kalliax" Ioannidis (Vocals, Guitar)
- Konstantinos Pantelis (Guitar)
- Ioannis "Elmer" Gerakios (Vocals)
- Nikos "Cookos" Koukos (Guitar)
