= Che Sudaka =

Musical group of Argentina, Colombia and Spain

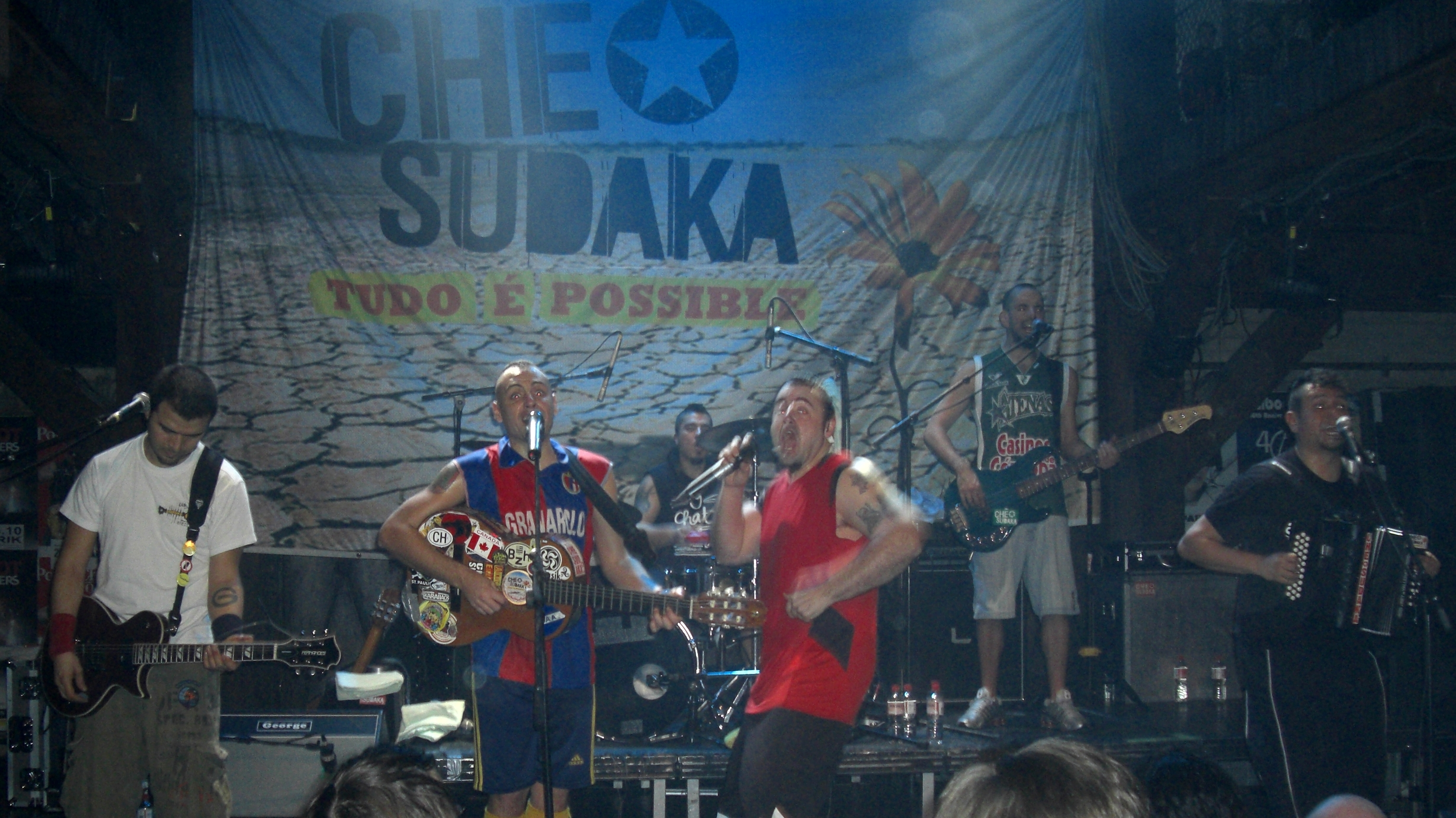

Background information
- Origin: Barcelona, Spain, Argentina, Colombia
- Genres: Cumbia, Reggae, punk, Ska, World music, Latin Alternative
- Members: Kachafaz; Leo; Sergio Morales; Jota
- Past members: Cordobes; Dani
- Website: www.chesudaka.com

Che Sudaka is a four-piece band, composed of Argentines and Colombians living in Barcelona, Spain. The band defines itself as punk reggae party while using rhythms inspired by hip-hop and ska.

== Name ==
The name comes from putting together the words "che", that in Mapuche language means "people", and "sudaca", which is a derogatory term used in Spain to refer to South Americans.

== Music ==
At the outset of the 2000s, a group of Hispanic American immigrants established Che Sudaka in Barcelona. The group play "mestizaje music" (Latin Alternative), a style combining traditional South American and Spanish styles with influences from ska, reggae, rock and world music. They have collaborated on projects with Manu Chao and Amparanoia.

== Discography ==
- Trippie Town (2003)
- Alerta Bihotza (2005)
- Mirando El Mundo Al Revès (2007)
- Tudo é Possible (2009)
- Cavernicola Recording Vol.1 (2010)
- 10 (2011)
- 1111 Lives (2013)
- Hoy (2014)
- Almas Rebeldes (2017)
- 20 Años (2022)

== Festivals ==
The band performed at:

- WOMAD Festival, England (2009)
- Fuji Rock Festival, Japan (2012)
- Nilüfer Müzik Festivali, Türkiye (2015)
- Pol'and'Rock Festival, Poland (2016)
- Czad Festival, Poland (2017)
- Street Mode Festival, Thessaloniki, Greece (2019)
