= Spinalonga Records =

Effort to promote alternative rock in Greece

Spinalonga Records is a self-organized, not-for-profit effort to promote the alternative and heavy rock of the Greek underground. It is based in Athens, Greece and was formed in late 2004. Its first release, titled In The Junkyard Volume 1, was a compilation consisting of tracks by unsigned Greek bands came out in late Spring 2005.

According to the organization's official website, Spinalonga Records' ultimate goal is to provide the groundwork for a healthy rock scene in Greece. Following a do-it-yourself route, it was originally conceived as a one shot alternative/stoner rock compilation effort, but was quickly transformed into a more substantial effort. The original idea behind Spinalonga Records was to bring Greek bands together, help them promote their music as far as they can, yet without engaging in commercial music production and distribution.

While its first steps were small, Spinalonga Records actively supports several Greek bands and as of 2007 it has released three compilations that include music ranging from hard rock and stoner to indie to post rock. A common denominator of all of those involved with the effort are the influences of the alternative rock genre of the 1990s which forms the core of its aesthetics.

Spinalonga Records is different from many other similar efforts both in their home country and abroad, in that it was conceived and is run by members of the bands and not by individuals from the music industry.

As of June 2007, Spinalonga Records was affiliated with more than 40 bands from all over Greece. In May 2007 it released its third compilation in the 'In the Junkyard' series. Since its inception it has organized numerous concerts in Athens and Thessaloniki with music that ranges from Ambient to Indie pop, Funk Rock and Alternative rock to Stoner and Heavy rock.

== History and releases ==
Spinalonga Records was conceived as an idea in the fall of 2004, when its founding bands met up and discussed the creation of a compilation containing music from Greek groups. Several months later, what ended up being the first volume of the 'In the Junkyard' series was a reality, featuring 14 groups.

With the release of In the Junkyard Volume 1, three shows were organized in Athens. During the months that followed and while the second compilation was being prepared 'In the Junkyard vol.1' sold-out. Volume 2 of the series was finally released in December 2005 featuring tracks by 15 groups. Between Spring and Winter 2005 the Spinalonga events gained considerable momentum and the label's popularity started rising.

In the period leading to the summer of 2006 several shows were organized, including the first one in Thessaloniki. In early Spring 2007, Spinalonga Records started compiling their latest release, In the Junkyard volume three which would be a double-CD compilation. 'Volume 3' was released in May 2007, this time featuring 28 groups from all over Greece.

In 2008 the label released the first full-length album of their catalogue, the debut of Semen of the Sun (co-released with 'the Lab Records'). Misuse, Modrec and Sugah Galore followed (all co-released with Puzzlemusik, Bantha and Feedback Sound respectively). In the meantime, the label organized a couple of shows with bands from outside Greece. The first being a very promising group from Turkey, Gevende. In the fall of 2008, Brant Bjork, drummer of the legendary stoner band Kyuss, was the second foreign act to play in a Spinalonga Records' event.

A list of releases is maintained on the Spinalonga records' website.

== Artist Roster/Affiliations ==
Artists Roster on Spinalonga Records Website
Sigmatropic, _{indie rock from Athens, GR, released on Hitch-Hyke records and Tongue Master records}
Echo tattoo, _{alternative rock from Athens, GR, released on Studio II Records and FM Records}
Poem, _{alternative metal from Athens, GR}
Absent Mindead, _{aggressive indie rock from Athens, GR}
the Velvoids, _{garage, R'n'R from Athens, GR}
Down & Out, _{southern rock from Athens, GR}
Yellow Devil Sauce, _{alternative metal/rock from Athens, GR, released on X-art.ici Records}
Misuse, _{post-heavy rock from Athens, GR, released on Tobruk Records}
Fingers Crossed, _{indie/pop-rock from Athens, GR, released on Ride N Crush Records and EMI Records}
Deus Ex Machina, _{punk rock from Athens, GR, released on Hitch-Hyke and Lab Records}
Sugah Galore, _{alternative/funk rock from Athens, GR}
the Earthbound, _{desert rock from Athens, GR, released on Trade Records and Sirius Records}
Liquidust, _{Hard rock/Stoner from Athens, GR}
in a Testube, _{Alternative Metal from Athens, GR}
Acid Baby, _{Hard Rock from Athens, GR}
Semen of the Sun, _{Heavy Rock from Athens, GR}
Low Gravity, _{fusion hard rock from Athens, GR}
the Dive, _{psychedelic desert rock from Athens, GR}
No Balance, _{emo rock from Athens, GR, released on Olon Music and Cannonball Records}
Lord 13, _{Stoner Rock from Athens, GR, released on Faster Louder Productions}
Sleepin Pillow, _{Experimental Rock Ethnic from Thessaloniki, GR}
Ludmila, _{Alternative Rock from Athens, GR}
Madame, _{indie/post-rock from Athens, GR}
Sun, Rain in life (ex-Teenage Angst), _{alternative/pop-punk from Athens, GR, released on Hitch-Hyke Records}
Bliss, _{Post-grunge/Heavy rock from Peraius, GR}
2L8, _{Alternative/Experimental/Industrial from Thessaloniki, GR, released on Poeta Negra Records}
Cube (band), _{alternative/heavy rock from Athens, GR, released on Buzzville Records}
Taste of Grief, _{Hard rock/stoner from Athens, GR}
Planet of Zeus, _{Heavy/Southern Rock from Athens, GR}
Bull Doza, _{Heavy Rock from Thessaloniki, GR, released on Lights Parade Productions}
Three Way Plane, _{Indie/punk from Athens, GR}
Fool in the Box, _{alternative rock from Athens, GR}
Black Circus, _{alternative/rock from Athens, GR}
Birthmark (band) (formerly known as Anima), _{alternative rock/metal from Athens, GR, released on V2 Records}
the Callas, _{toy-punk from Athens, GR, released on Out of Tune! Records}
Bad Mathematics, _{Indie rock from Athens, GR, released on Tobruk Records}
Scab Level, _{indie/alternative/ska from Thessaloniki, GR, released on RunDevilRun Records}
Small Hours Society, _{Shoegaze/alternative from Serres, GR}
the Prefabricated Quartet, _{soundtrack/post-rock from Thessaloniki, GR, released on RunDevilRun Records}
Jane Doe, _{indie rock from Thessaloniki, GR, released on RunDevilRun Records}
Afformance, _{post-rock from Athens, GR}
Under-V-Covers _{southern rock/metal from Athens, GR}
Nightstalker _{heavy rock from Athens, GR, released on Hitch-Hyke Records, FM Records, VinylLust Records, Mad Prophet Records, Nasoni Records}
1000mods _{psychedelic/stoner rock from Chiliomodi, GR, released on Kozmik Artifactz Recs, Cts prods, Suisound Recs}

=== Artists that have performed live on Spinalonga shows ===
Echo tattoo, National Pornografik, Spyweirdos, Absent Mindead, the Velvoids, Down & Out, Yellow Devil Sauce, Misuse, Fingers Crossed, Mary and the Boy, Marmaladies, SlimShine Musik Box, Sugah Galore, Hues and Separation, Liquidust, in a Testube, Acid Baby, Semen of the Sun, Low Gravity, the Dive, Lord 13, the Screaming Fly, Ludmila, Madame, Sun, Rain in life (ex-Teenage Angst), Bliss, Absent without Leave, Cube, Universe 217, Planet of Zeus, Red Light, Three Way Plane, the Hangover, Nurse, Birthmark, Gevende, 1000mods, MADLEAF, For What Is Worth, Extraordinary Rendition, Scab Level, Sleepin Pillow, Bad Mathematics, Black Circus, Night on Earth, Fool in the box, beyond perception and Brant Bjork.
