= Misuse (band) =

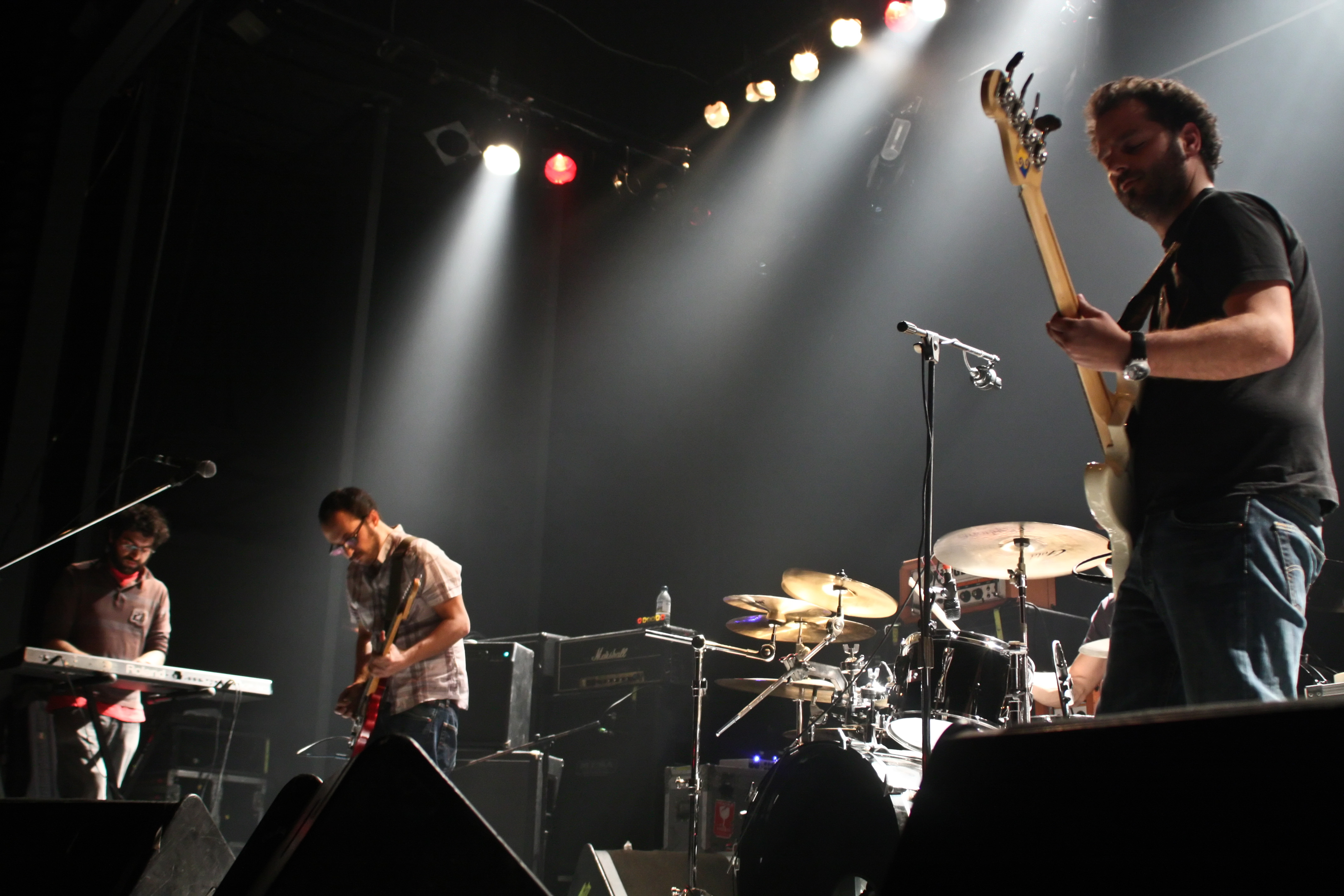
- Misuse performing live at club "Gagarin 205" Athens, 20 February 2009, supporting Mogwai.

Background information
- Origin: Athens, Greece
- Genres: Instrumental rock, electronic music, post-rock
- Years active: 2001–present
- Labels: Puzzlemusik Records, Spinalonga Records
- Website: www.misuseband.com

Misuse is a five-piece instrumental group from Athens, Greece. Their music is mainly characterized as post-rock mixed with electronic music elements. Their tracks often follow a scenario-based structure, which has led some critics to describe their music as "cinematic rock".

== History ==
Misuse were formed in 2001 by Spiros Kintzios (guitar), Dimitris Patsaros (guitar), Costas Stergiou (keys), Christos Kormalis (drums) and were shortly afterwards joined by Stauros Maragkos (bass). In 2002 they record their first demo, consisting of 8 tracks and start performing live in the local scene. In 2005 Titos Moschakis takes the place of Spiros Kintzios and in the winter of the same year Christos Kormalis leaves the band. After a few months of inactivity, drummer Nikos Dimitrakakos (a.k.a. nid) joins the band. Sadly, on 18 September 2006, Christos Kormalis loses his life in a motorbike accident. His performance can be heard on the tracks "Locked in a bar" and "Enemy Lapdance" (these tracks were never re-recorded after the demo, partly as a tribute to Christos). Misuse have pointed out that he is always considered as an active member of the band.

In 2007 Christos Alexopoulos of Puzzlemusik Records approaches Misuse and urges them to (at last) make an album. This leads a year later to the production of their first self-titled studio album which soon gets many and very positive reviews in the Greek press and online music websites. Five out of the album's eight tracks are older tracks already recorded in their 2002 demo, recorded again from scratch, with a renewed approach. The album gets released in March 2008 by Puzzlemusik Records and Spinalonga Records on CD. In the following months the band performs live in various stages around Greece along many big names of the worldwide post-rock scene such as Mogwai (who have repeatedly picked Misuse for opening up their shows in Greece), Silver Mount Zion, Crippled Black Phoenix, Piano Magic and others.

In summer 2010 Titos Moschakis leaves the band due to personal obligations. The band carries on as a quartet, writing a large amount of the music of their second album. After a short time they eventually decide that the gap of the second guitar must be filled in in order to sustain their arrangement methods and general style approach. Early 2011 Leuteris Volanis joins as guitar player. Mid-2011 finds Misuse in the studio producing the album "April" with the help of Spinalonga Records' Philip Kaponis as co-producer. The album gets released on 16 November 2011 by Puzzlemusik Records and Spinalonga Records.

Misuse have often collaborated in their shows with visual artists such as "Hope". Some of their tracks have been choreographed and some have been featured in shows and documentaries in Greek television.

== Musical style ==
In its first years the band's sound was influenced by alternative and heavy rock of the 90's, fused with string arrangements to form long lyrical and dynamical compositions. The self-titled debut album, consisting of tracks composed between 2001–2008, is rooted to guitar driven rock forms, alongside piano/keys and string arrangements. In a sense, it explores the possibilities within post-metal, progressive rock and instrumental rock. From 2009 to 2011 the acquirement and addition of new equipment, mostly modern electronic devices (such as iOS Applications, Samplers and Sequencers), leads the band to new ways of composing. Thus a new sound emerged which resulted in lengthy instrumental compositions, maintaining the bands' esthetic signature, while fusing new elements that borrowed heavily from electronic genres in an unprecedented way.

== Band members ==
Current:

- Dimitris Patsaros – guitar, programming (2001–present)
- Costas Stergiou – keys, piano, programming (2001–present)
- Stavros Maragkos – bass (2001–present)
- Nikos Dimitrakakos (nid) – drums, programming (2006–present)
- Leuteris Volanis – guitar (2011–present)

Former:

- Spiros Kintzios – guitar (2001–2005)
- Christos Chormalis – drums (2001–2005)
- Titos Moschakis – guitar (2005–2010)

== Discography ==
=== Studio albums ===
- misuse (2008)
- April (2011)

=== Compilations ===
- "Mad Athens Presents Pop Scene 01" by Rubber
- "Civil Cinder REgalia Vol. 1" by Tobruk Records
- "In The Junkyard vol.1" by Spinalonga Records
- "In The Junkyard vol.3" by Spinalonga Records
- "First Steps : 2 years of Puzzlemusik" by Puzzlemusik Records

== See also ==
- List of post-rock bands
