= Evi Hassapides Watson =

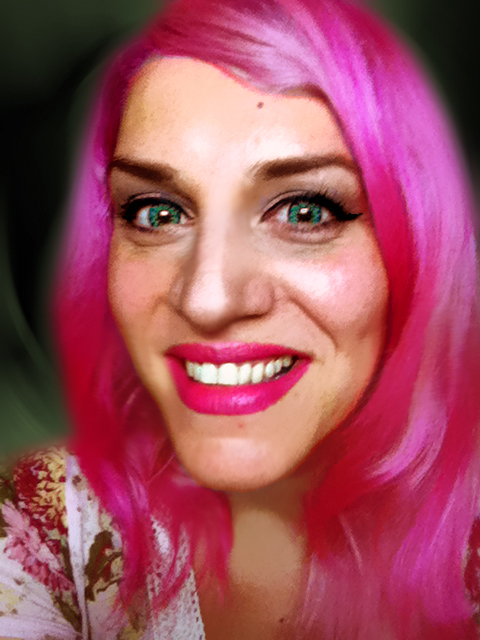

Background information
- Born: Betty, No5; Corfu, Greece
- Instruments: Vocals, Guitar, Piano, Bass, Drums
- Member of: She Tames Chaos, Robert Sin and the Huckleberries
- Formerly of: No Man's Land, Echo Tattoo

Evi Hassapides Watson is a Greek musician, known primarily as a vocalist.

Singer/Songwriter Evi Hassapides Watson (stage name for Evdoxia Chasapidi) is best known as "The Voice" as lead vocalist for two iconic Greek underground bands, No Man's Land and Echo Tattoo. She Tames Chaos are her current, third band.

Watson, whom the specialist music press have named "Queen of the Greek Underground" and "Greece's leading female vocalist". is considered to be "one of the most influential female performers in Greece"

Watson was raised amongst Greek Americans, Americans, Brits and Canadian-Americans (one of the latter being her uncle Carl Maxwell Watson a.k.a. Hap, Director of Broadcast Standards for WNBC, NY, until his retirement in 1975). As a result, she embraced the American culture and the English language as her vessel in lyrics that examine multiple layers of the human psyche. A passionate feminist and an equal rights supporter Watson writes about love, injustice and the human condition.

Watson's first recordings were made on a Sony tape recorder at the age of three, by her father.

== Career ==
Watson first appears in Greek discography, as one of the two singers (Athanassiades being the other one) in No Man's Land's first album, Zalion, in 1988. The album and the band gained great popularity and critical praise much due to Watson's vocals and stage performances. No Man's Land toured Greece, playing in various bars and stages, and represented Greece at the 1986 Biennale in Thessaloniki, side by side with other important Greek Bands of the time such as Libido Blume.

In September 1989 she leaves No Man's Land to create Echo Tattoo with Panos Kourtsounis. Echo Tattoo released three albums with four different Labels: Self-Titled Echo Tattoo -1992- Studio II, Room of toys -1997- FM Records (on which the band worked with producer Bryan New, in Bath and London, UK), Mind your Step -2008- Recycled Recordings (on which Watson is the primary songwriter as well as the mixing engineer and producer) and a Vinyl re-issue of Mind Your Step with Labyrinth of thoughts in 2014. All the covers for the 200 copies of the vinyl re-issue of Mind your Step, were hand-painted by Watson herself. As a multi-instrumentalist, Watson was able to record a multitude of additional vocal sounds and instrument riffs on Mind Your Step. She edited, mixed and produced a large portion of the album. Echo Tattoo are one of the most significant bands of the Athenian Underground Scene but have not always been active, as band members changed often, a fact which led to periods of inactivity followed by periods of new members' training. In 1993 they made the cover of Billboard magazine as Leaders of the Greek Rock Scene. The band toured Greece numerous times, supported U2 in their POP MART tour stop in Greece and won the 1996 SCYPE (Song Competition of Youth Programs in Europe) Competition which was held in Copenhagen on March 24, 1996, and was broadcast by the Official Radio Stations of all European Union Country Members, during which the listeners voted in favor of Echo Tattoo's recording of their original song "Over", which was mainly composed by Watson.

Her current bands are She Tames Chaos with whom she writes, sings and produces and Robert Sin and the Huckleberries, with whom she plays the bass and sings backing vocals.

Watson earns a living as a copy editor for Greek Business File, an English-spoken magazine that analyses the Greek Economy published by Economia Group, and an English tutor. She has been known to work in various Artistic fields as well as Advertising and Film: Painter (her murals and paintings decorated some notable Athenian and Spartan pubs and bars), Voice Over Talent, Actress, Vocalist, Composer, Ad Script Writer, Translator, Sub-titlist.

== Discography ==
Associated acts Albums
No Man's Land - Zalion - Pegasus Records - Vinyl LP - 1988
Echo Tattoo - Echo Tattoo - Studio II - Vinyl LP - 1992
Echo Tattoo - Room of Toys - FM Records - CD Album -1997
Echo Tattoo - Mind Your Step - Recycled Recordings - CD Album -2008
Echo Tattoo - Mind Your Step - Labyrinth Of Thoughts - Vinyl LP - 2014
Robert Sin and the Huckleberries - ...And The Ghosts In Between - G.O.D. Records - CD Album - 2016
She Tames Chaos - Oh, Fair father where Art Thou? - God Records - Vinyl LP - 2016 Robert Sin - Inward The Course Of The Empire Takes Its Way - 2025

Guest Lead & Backing Vocals
1. Tr: Various - Purple Overdose - Exit #4 - Pegasus Records - Vinyl LP - 1988
2. Tr: The Sea - Yeah! - Yeah!- Ano Kato Records- Vinyl LP - 1988
3. Tr: Stilpni in'i nychta & 1 more - Symmoria - Nychtes - Ano Kato Records - Vinyl LP - 1989
4. Tr: Reptile Dance, Black Snow - Flowers Of Romance - Brilliant Mistakes - FM Records - CD Album -1996
5. Tr: Iparchi mono agapi - Markos Papasifakis - Pame ki erchomasste - Warehouse Records - CD Album - 1996
6. Tr: Various - Christos Vogiatzis - Se dyo kosmous - Warehouse Records - CD, Single - 1996
7. Tr: O Erastis tis fygis - Evnus - To kako oniro - Warehouse Records - CD Single - 1996
8. Tr: Innocent Lie - Matisse - Cheap As Art - Columbia - CD Album - 2005
9. Tr: What You Sing Is What You Get, Scream for I, Spanish Class, Sun Song, Seashell In My Drink, Evi's Lament
Blend (Mishkin) - Man Under Influence - Sirius - CD Album - 2005
10. Tr: Smoke, Jam Skit, Fuck The System/Use Your Imagination - Blend (Mishkin)-Misplaced - Cast-A-Blast 2006
11: Tr: Run To Your Mama - 7-Odds - People Wanna See - Front Yard - EP - 2015

Compilation Albums
1. Tr: No Man's Land -Blue Train - Various - Cicadas (An Electric Guide To The Greek Underground) LP-Comp - Pegasus Records 1987
2. Tr: Echo Tattoo: The Do it Story - Various - Studio II Collection - Studio II Records - LP-Comp - 1991
3. Tr: Echo Tattoo - Refugee, Bliss - Assemble the Temple - Various – In The Junkyard Volume Two - Spinalonga Records - CD Comp - 2005
