= Katrin the Thrill =

- Born: Katerina Panopoulou
- Origin: Athens, Greece
- Genres: Indie, alternative rock
- Occupations: musician, songwriter
- Instruments: Vocals, guitar
- Label: Incense
- Website: www.katrinthethrill.com

Katrin the Thrill (Katerina Panopoulou) is a singer-songwriter from Athens, Greece.

== Early career ==
At the age of 17, she started creating music as a singer with some friends. When the band broke up she got herself an electric guitar and started writing her own songs. In 2001, she moved to Manchester, England to study music. Two years later, she returned to Greece and teamed up with Guitarist Gina Dimakopoulou, violinist Katerina Michailidi, bassist Iakovos Siaparinas, drummer Dimitris Panagiotopoulos and formed the band Dementia Praecox. After many live performances in Greece, she broke up the band and moved to London, England to further her studies. During her stay in London, she performed live in several pubs, singing her songs unplugged.

== Solo career ==
In 2007, under the name Katrin the Thrill, she participated in the Coca-Cola Sounwave music contest, and won a place among the best music acts. Her song If You Believe in Dreams was included in the Music on the coke side of life compilation. For the next two years she performed in Greece in various music stages and festivals, among them, Terra Vibe Park, Gagarin 205, Vrachon Theater, European Music Day, Bios, Athens Gay Pride, Festival Against Racism, Indie Free Festival and shared the stage with Electrelane, Manic Street Preachers, Greg Dulli and Chinawoman. In 2009, following the devastating fires that swept through Greece, as well as many other places around the world, the concept for Earth is calling us EP was devised, and the need to take action and help reforestation was fully realized.

== Recent activity ==
In 2010, the Earth is calling us EP was released by Incense, as her first solo project dedicated to the earth and the environment. Her song You make me wanna die was voted for the MWR Alternative Top Charts and her EP was considered as one of the best indie rock Greek releases of the year 2010.

== Discography ==
Earth is calling us EP (2010)

Evil Eye Charm (2012)

== Compilation albums ==
Music on the coke side of life (2007)

www.elliniki-skini.gr (2011)

The Indie Side of Music Vol II (2014)
