= Sevas Hanum =

Greek singer

Sevas Hanum Σεβάς Χανούμ
- Born: Sevasti Papadopoulou; 8 September 1931; Kokinogeia, Greece
- Died: 18 May 1990 (aged 58) Neapoli, Thessaloniki, Greece
- Genre: Éntekhno
- Occupations: Composer, conductor

Sevas Hanum (Greek: Σεβάς Χανούμ; 8 September 1931 – 18 May 1990) was a Greek singer. Her real name was Sevasti Papadopoulou (Greek: Σεβαστή Παπαδοπούλου) and she became popular in the 1950s and 1960s by singing oriental songs. She was engaged to Stelios Kazantzidis, with whom she worked.

In 1983, Sevas Hanum gave an interview to Giorgios Chronas, that was used for a theater play about her life. The play was directed by Konstantinos Rigos and performed by Konstantina Mihail and Jason Chronis.
