= Kore. Ydro. =

Greek indie rock band

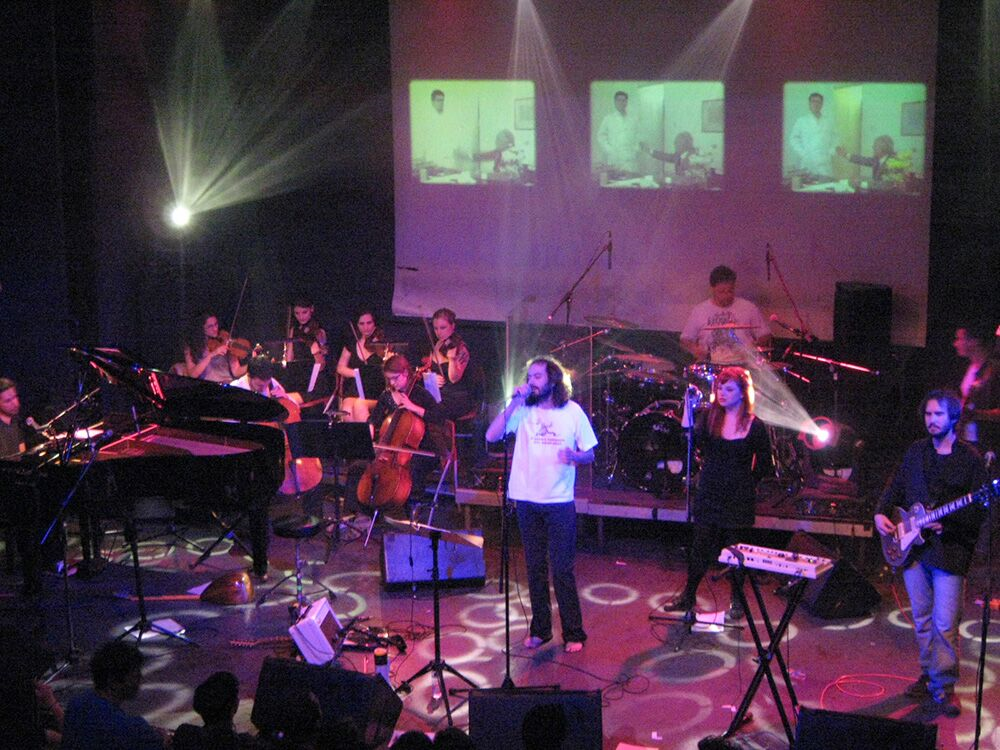

Background information
- Origin: Corfu, Greece
- Genres: Indie rock; chamber pop; indie pop; piano rock; post-britpop; dream pop; slowcore (early)
- Years active: 1993-2014
- Labels: Anousia Entasi; Wipeout Records; EMI; Inner Ear
- Members: Pantelis Dimitriadis; Alexandros Makris; Konstantinos Amygdalos; Giorgos Arvanitakis Spiros Katagis; Nikos Varotsis; Spiros Spirakos; Alexis Apostolidis; Panagiotis Diamantis; Mario Plaskasovitis; Pantelis Petrou; Aggelos Sersemis; Foivos Anthis
- Website: koreydro.anousia.gr

Kore. Ydro. were an indie rock group from the Greek island of Corfu.

== Biography ==
Kore. Ydro. (Greek: Κόρε. Ύδρο.) were formed in Corfu, Greece, during the autumn of 1993 by 15-year-old schoolmates Pantelis Dimitriadis, Giorgos Arvanitakis and Spiros Katagis. Konstantinos Amygdalos joined in 1997 and Spiros Katagis departed in 2000. Pianist/multi-instrumentalist Alexandros Makris joined in 2001, creating Kore. Ydro.’s music core with Dimitriadis.

Kore. Ydro.'s early output was "no-fi" home recordings of trash aesthetics, peculiar live performances, "raw" video clips and humorous short "films". Their self-produced official debut If All Ever Ended Here [An Ola Telionan Edo] was released in March 2003 by the Greek label Wipeout Records in 515 copies. The downloadable-only mini album Seven Months Later [Efta Mines Meta] followed seven months later.

February 2004 saw the release of the first official Kore. Ydro. video - also produced by the group - for the song "Your Kindness" [I Kalossini Sou], the highlight of If All Ever Ended Here.

In February 2006, three years after the release of the critically acclaimed debut, Kore. Ydro. released Cheap Pop for the Elite [Ftini Pop ya tin Elit] (Greek: Φτηνή ποπ για την ελίτ) on a new label (Capitol/EMI).

The album's title referred to the self-proclaimed "new post-erotic, post-christian, post-communist, post-progressive, post-post-punk manifesto" of the band. The album was recorded ahead of the EMI contract in the group's home studio in Corfu by Dimitriadis, Makris and three new members: drummer Alexis Apostolidis and the guitarists Spiros Spirakos and Nickos Varotsis, exempting Arvanitakis and Amygdalos from their musical obligations and leaving them free to concentrate on the group's visual arts activities which was always their main subject.

The record received enthusiastic reviews by the Greek music press and the first single/video (produced and directed by the band) "No More Affairs" [Ochi Pia Erotes] became an unexpected hit.

In March 2006 Kore. Ydro. appeared live for the first time in Athens (Gagarin 205), while it had already been made official the collaboration of the group with bass player Panagiotis Diamantis, who directed the second video from Cheap Pop for the Elite, for the song "Now that I Do not Have Anyone" [Tora pou den Eho Kanenan] (June 2006). The band-directed video for “The Lovers of Nothing” [Oi Erastes tou Tipota] followed in November 2006. In the same month, Greek music magazine SONIK named Cheap Pop for the Elite “the most important Greek album of the decade up to now.” Kore. Ydro. live appearances climaxed precisely one year after the release of CPftE with their second live in Gagarin 205 [February 2007] in front of a fanatic audience and with an impact that rendered the particular gig a peak in the band's history.

During 2008 all the lately recruited members left or were gradually alienated from the group. Since then Kore. Ydro. continue as a duo again, with the assistance of the visual arts duo Arvanitakis-Amygdalos and drummer Fivos Anthis. The third official Kore. Ydro. album The Whole Truth about the Children of '78 [Oli i Alithia ya ta Pedia tou ‘78] was released in April 2009 on CD by Capitol/EMI. A collector's double LP edition followed three months later, on the independent Inner Ear.

The band's final album Simple Exercises on Existentialism [Aples Askisis Ston Iparksismo] was released in April 2013 by Inner Ear. A year later, in 2014, the band broke up, as announced on their official website.

== Discography ==
- If All Ever Ended Here [Αν Όλα Τέλειωναν Εδώ] (Wipeout Records) 2003
- Seven Months Later [Εφτά Μήνες Μετά] EP (online release) 2003
- Cheap Pop for the Elite [Φτηνή Ποπ για την Ελίτ] (Capitol) 2006
- The Whole Truth about the Children of '78 [Όλη η Αλήθεια για τα Παιδιά του '78] (Capitol) 2009
- Simple Exercises on Existentialism [Απλές Ασκήσεις στον Υπαρξισμό] (Inner Ear) 2013
