= Earthbound (TV program) =

1982 Canadian television program

- Genre: Current affairs
- Presented by: Fred Langer
- Country of origin: Canada
- Original language: English
- No. of seasons: 1

Production
- Executive producer: Robert Petch
- Producer: Jane du Broy
- Running time: 30 minutes

Original release
- Network: CBC Television
- Release: 6 June – 19 September 1982

Earthbound is a Canadian current affairs television program that aired on CBC Television in 1982.

== Premise ==
Fred Langer hosted this program that was focused on issues of Canada's resource-based industries and their ecology. Topics included oil pricing differences between Canada and the United States, renewal in the Atlantic fishing industry, grain transport costs and their consequences for western Canada, and the lack of international competitiveness in the Canadian forestry sector.

== Scheduling ==
This half-hour program was broadcast on Sundays at 1:00 p.m. (Eastern) from 6 June to 19 September 1982.
