= Socrates Drank the Conium =

Greek rock band

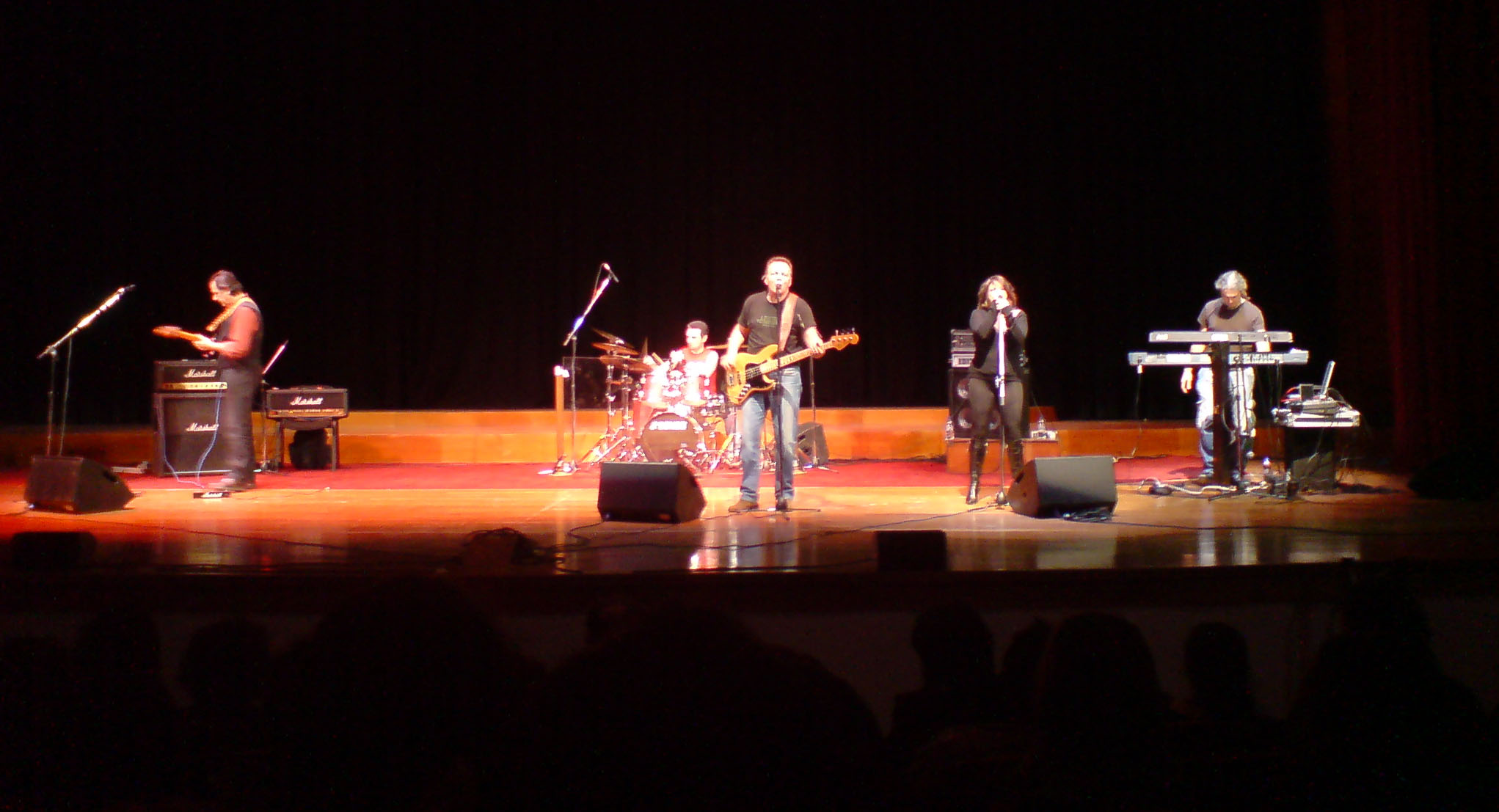
- Socrates performing live at the University of Patras (2008)

Background information
- Origin: Athens, Greece
- Genres: Hard rock, blues-rock, progressive rock, psychedelic rock
- Years active: 1969–2010
- Labels: Polygram; Vertigo; Virgin
- Members: Last Lineup (2010); Antonis Tourkogiorgis; Yannis Spathas; Makis Gioulis
- Past members: Asterios Papastamatakis; Markella Panagiotou; Elias Boukouvalas; George Trantalidis; Nikos Antypas; Yiorgos Zikoyiannis; Pavlos Alexiou; Leonidas Alachadamis; Kostas "Gus" Doukakis

Socrates Drank the Conium, known also as Socrates, was a Greek rock band that formed in 1969 and achieved success in the 1970s. Influenced by heavy blues and rock bands like The Jimi Hendrix Experience and Cream, the band melded the unorthodox time signatures and orchestration of progressive rock and the intensity of blues and hard rock music, creating a unique sound that distinguished them from other Greek rock acts of that period. Outside Greece, Socrates is best known for Phos, their 1976 landmark collaboration album with Vangelis.

The group has gone through many lineup changes, but the two core members remained: guitarist Yannis Spathas and bassist/singer Antonis Tourkogiorgis. Spathas died in 2019, aged 68. Nikos Antipas died on January 31, 2022, from complications related to stroke, aged 68.

== History ==
Socrates began its career in the clubs of Athens, most prominently the popular Kyttaro. They were present at a number of other locations in and around Victoria Square in Athens. In addition to performing originals, Socrates often covered Jimi Hendrix songs, none of which were featured on any studio releases; a thirteen-minute cover of "(I Can't Get No) Satisfaction" by the Rolling Stones, however, found its way onto their 1972 album Taste of Conium.

Yannis Spathas favored two sunburst Fender Stratocasters, a Candy Apple Red Roland GR-505 guitar synthesizer, a black Gibson Les Paul Custom and a cherry sunburst Les Paul Standard. Antonis Tourkogiorgis played a mid-1970s natural ash-bodied Fender Jazz Bass and a Warwick Corvette Double Buck bass and sang, while several drummers were used throughout the live shows and recording sessions.

In 1975, Socrates went through a change in stylistic direction with Phos, which featured Vangelis' production and contributions on many tracks. Phos was mostly reworkings of older songs by Socrates. Both LPs On the Wings and Phos were issued in the USA via Neil Kempfer-Stocker's Prog imprint Cosmos.

In 1999, Socrates reunited in an extended form (featuring keyboards and a second singer) to do several shows around Greece.

In 2009, Yannis Spathas, Antonis Tourkogiorgis and Makis Gioulis started making a new album. Recordings ceased due to a serious health issue Tourkogiorgis faced in 2010. This material was salvaged and released in September 2023 under the title Last Forever (Neradou) by EMI/Universal, mixed by Kostas Bigalis.

Yannis Spathas died on 6 July 2019, aged 68.

Antonis Tourkogiorgis died on 5 May 2024, aged 73.

== Band members ==
Last lineup (2010)

- Antonis Tourkogiorgis – lead vocals, bass (died on 5 May 2024)
- Yannis Spathas – lead guitar (died on 6 July 2019)
- Makis Gioulis – drums

Past members

- Markella Panayiotou – backing vocals (reunion 1999–2009)
- Asterios Papastamatakis – keyboards
- Elias Boukouvalas – drums
- Kostas "Gus" Doukakis – guitar
- George Trantalidis – drums
- Nikos Antypas – drums
- Costas Karamitros – drums
- Costas Triantaphyllou – guitar
- Yiorgos Zikoyiannis – bass
- Pavlos Alexiou – keyboards
- Leonidas Alachadamis – drums

== Discography ==
Albums

- Socrates Drank the Conium – 1971
- Taste of Conium – 1972
- On the Wings – 1973
- Phos – 1976
- Waiting for Something – 1980
- Breaking Through – 1981
- Plaza – 1983
- Live in Concert – 1999
- Last Forever (Neradou) – 2023

Singles

- "My Only Fellow / Friends Blues" – 1971
- "Live in the Country" – 1972
- "Starvation / Queen of the Universe" – 1976
- "Justice (Live)" – 1999

Compilations

- From Persons to Socrates Drank the Conium – The Singles Collection – 1996
- The Complete Polydor Years – 1997
- The Original Singles – 2005

VA

- Live at Kyttaro – 1971
