= Mazoo and the Zoo =

Greek musical group

Mazoo and the Zoo is a Greek music group that performs songs for children in Greece.

== The Group ==
Manos Vafiadis is the composer and author (lyrics) of the most popular Greek CD Mazoo and the Zoo . Mazoo and the Zoo also has three other members Tereza Sassou and the siblings Efthimis Kokkinaras and Artemis Kokkinara. They came together three years ago and at first they were the presenters of kids' shows in the Greek channel Alter. After a while they signed a music contract with Alter's music label Kid's Songs and they recorded their first album. Their songs are short funny stories about animals. The trio sings and also makes the video clips which are broadcast on Alter. Both their albums reached #1 at the IFPI Greek albums charts.

The band had their own theatrical show. They used to perform on weekends on the stage of the Aliki theatre in Athens.

== Discography ==
- 2007-Mazoo and the Zoo (Platinum)
- 2009-Mazoo and the Zoo 2 (Platinum)
- 2009-Mazoo and the Zoo 3 (Platinum)
