= Thrax Punks =

Greek punk rock band

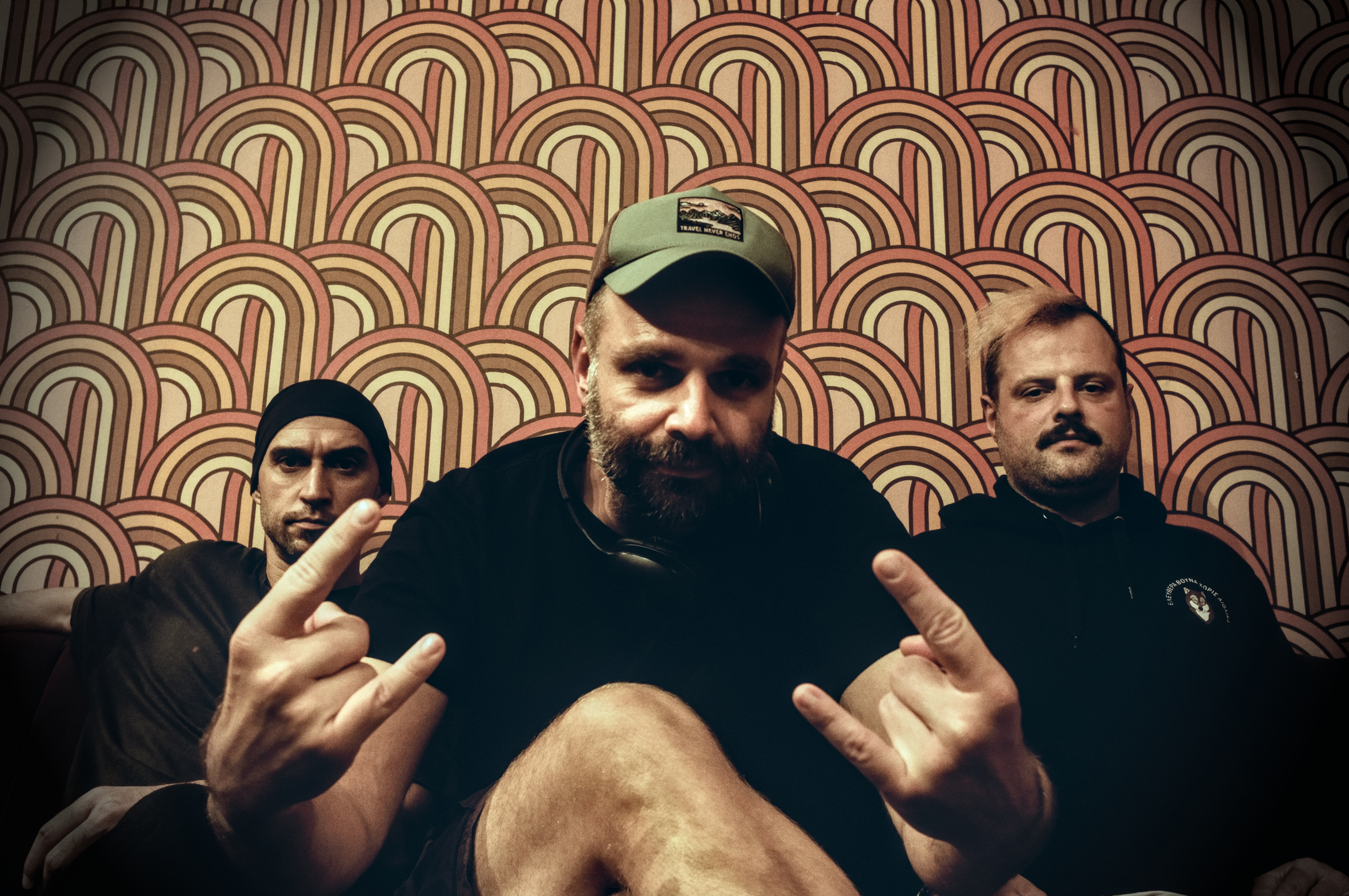

Background information
- Origin: Greece
- Genres: Psychedelic rock Punk rock Folk music
- Years active: 2004-present
- Members: George Stavridis; Vaios-Alexandros Charakopidis; Panos Gkinis; Markos Koutsianas

Thrax Punks (Greek: Θραξ Πανκc) is a Greek punk rock band originating from Thrace, Greece, founded in the mid-2000s. Their music lies at the crossroads of Thracian folk music and punk/rock aesthetics, combining instruments such as the gaida, davul and Thracian lyre with electric guitar and bass guitar.

Thrax Punks members are: George Stavridis (davul, thracian lyre, vocals), Vaios-Alexandros Charakopidis (gaida, kaval, zurna, synths, vocals), Panos Gkinis (electric guitars) & Markos Koutsianas (sound engineer).

== History ==
The collaboration began around 2004 when Stavridis and Charakopidis, met through mutual friends and shared musical tastes. They began playing music at improvised feasts, traditional festivals, marches, and small local events. They made their first concert appearance under the name "Thrax Punks" in 2010 at a festival. The project evolved into a full band in 2015 with the addition of Gkinis on guitars, marking the transition to a more fusion-oriented sound. Over the years, the group has been based both in Thrace and in Athens, performing at festivals, theatres and underground venues across Greece and abroad.

== Musical style, live presence and reception ==
Thrax Punks describe their sound as a fusion of Thracian folk and punk-rock psychedelia, blending traditional modal scales and dance rhythms with distorted guitars, looping and intense percussive energy. Their trademark “punk-fête” aesthetic draws on the ecstatic atmosphere of rural celebrations while channelling the rawness of underground rock. Their concerts are often immersive and high-energy, combining ritualistic elements and mosh-pit dynamics that bridge the gap between ancient Dionysian spirit and modern subculture. The band has performed extensively across Greece and Europe, including appearances at the Athens and Epidaurus Festival and the Onassis Cultural Centre, as well as international stages such as GROUNDS (Rotterdam). Critics and audiences have praised the group for re-imagining regional folk traditions through a contemporary, genre-defying performance style that bridges the ritual and the rebellious, making them one of the most distinctive acts in the Greek alternative scene.

The band has often expressed its views on issues such as immigration, the relationship between art and politics, misogyny, and other social concerns.

== Theatre collaborations ==
In 2021, the group composed and performed the original score for The Bacchae by Euripides (directed by Nikaiti Kontouri) at the Ancient Theatre of Epidaurus as part of the Athens–Epidaurus Festival. In 2023, they created the music for the theatre production Spyridoules (directed by Thanasis Zeritis and Harry Kremmydas) presented at the same festival.

== Discography ==
- 2016 – Πανκοπανηγυροψυχεδέλεια (Punkopanigiropsychedelia)
- 2019 – Thrax Punks
- 2023 – Βάκχες (Bacchae) – music for the theatrical play The Bacchae
- 2024 – Thrax Punks II
