= Deus Ex Machina (punk band) =

Hardcore punk band

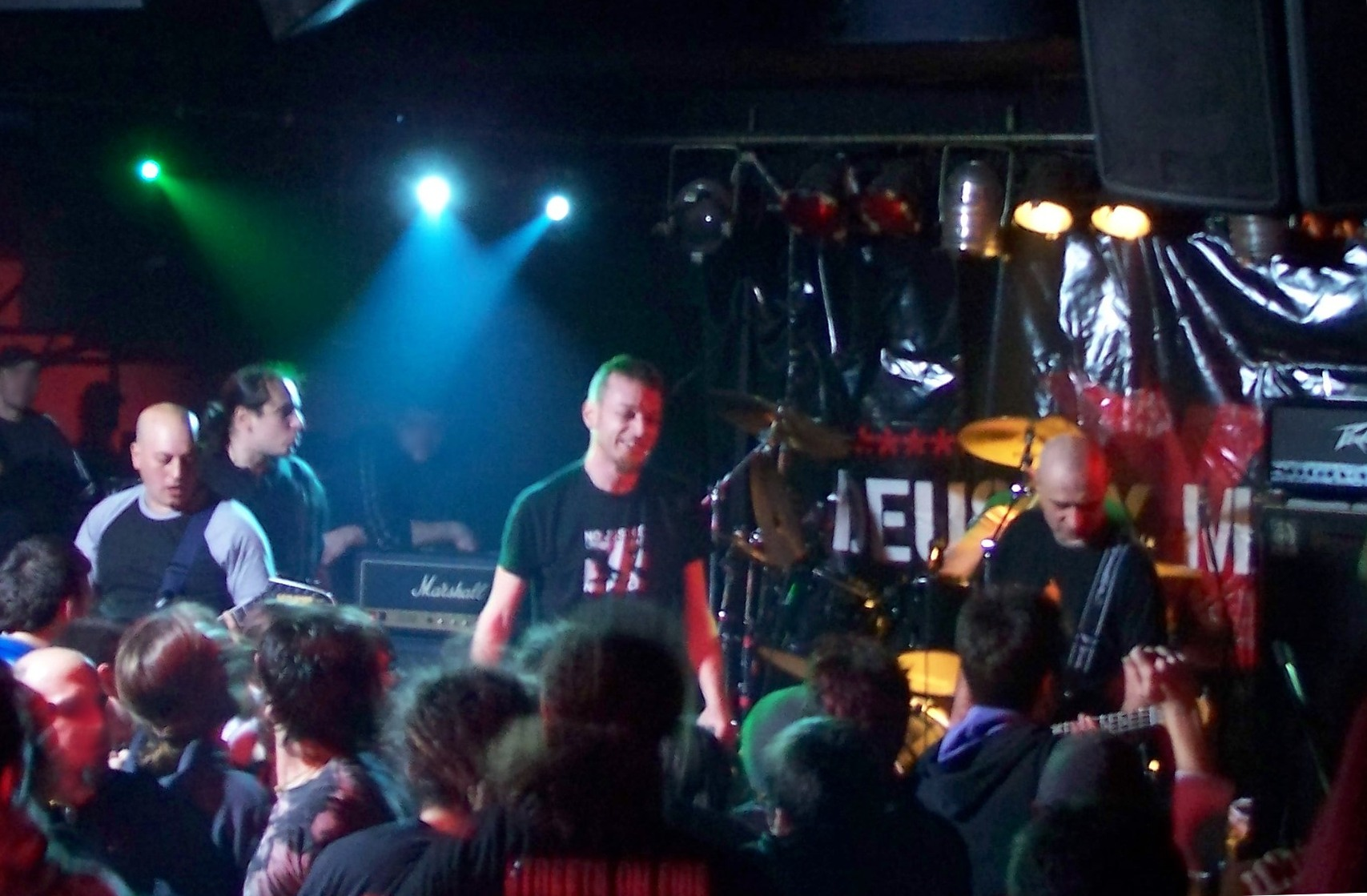
Deus Ex Machina, 2008

Deus Ex Machina is a popular Greek hardcore punk band from Athens formed in 1989 by Dimitris Spyropoulos and Dimitris Manthos, with Spyropoulos and Yiannis Venardis (the group's drummer) having already been early Greek punk scene's 'veterans' (they were members of Adiexodo).

The band's lyrics are often political having references to subjects such as the War on Iraq and the Mexican Zapatista Army of National Liberation movement.

== Discography (selected) ==
- Motorpsycho (Hitch Hyke 1990)
- Worlds Apart (Hitch Hyke 1993)
- Execute/Iraq 'n' Roll (Hitch Hyke 1992)
- No Silence/SDS (Hitch Hyke 1995)
- Different? (EP, Hitch Hyke 1997)
- Signs (Hitch Hyke 2003)
- Time Expires (EP, The Lab 2007)
- 38 Hiliosta / bastardokratia (7', The Lab 2012)
- The Sound of Liberation (LP, CD, The Lab 2013)

== Band members ==
- Stavros X (vocals)
- Dimitris Spyropoulos (guitar)
- Tolik (guitar)
- Dimitris Manthos (bass)
- Kostas Petrou (drums)
