= Betty Harlafti =

Greek singer

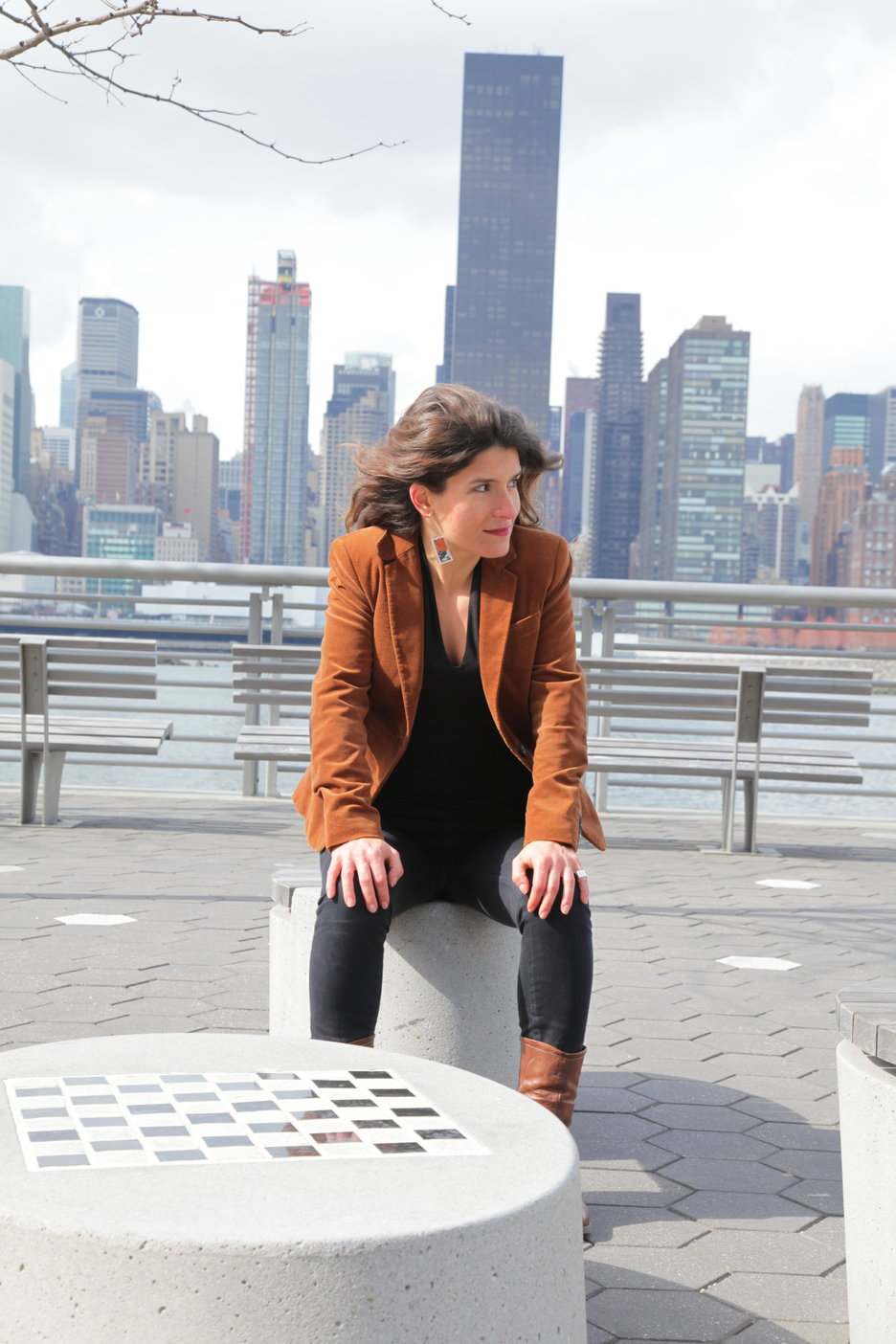
- Harlafti in February 2014

Background information
- Born: Athens, Greece
- Genres: Classical and contemporary multilingual music
- Occupations: Mezzo-soprano, singer
- Years active: 2011–present
- Website: facebook.com/Betty-Harlafti-Μπέττυ-Χαρλαύτη-195297943987362/

Betty Harlafti (Greek: Μπέττυ Χαρλαύτη) is a Greek contemporary singer, a classically trained mezzo-soprano and performs a crossover repertoire in several languages.

Her latest album “Betty Harlafti in the World of Mikis Theodorakis”, produced by the Hellenic Broadcasting Corporation (ERT) Greek National Radio Orchestra, puts Harlafti among the few performers in her country who have recorded a personal album with a symphony orchestra. World renowned artists Zülfü Livaneli and Maria Farantouri honour her with their participation. Γιώργος Περρής also participates.

Harlafti has performed in several concerts in the United States and Europe with diverse repertoire.

Amongst other she has performed in at Merkin Concert Hall in Manhattan for Mikis Theodorakis' 90th birthday, in the Harvard Club of New York City, in Switzerland - Salle Paderewski, in Germany-Lutherkirche in Cologne, Cyprus, Finland, Israel, etc.

She has also appeared in Brussels singing Theodorakis’ great oratorio Canto General.

She has performed in major theaters in Greece like in Odeon of Herodes Atticus, Greek National Opera Alternative Stage, the Athens Concert Hall, the Badminton Theater etc.

Betty Harlafti has appeared on stage with Maria Farantouri, El Sistema Greece, Mario Frangoulis etc. She has also performed in festivals, live television & radio broadcasts and participated as guest artist in several album releases.

When her first album “Who may you be?”, with old Greek songs and Rembetika from the interwar period composer Michalis Souyoul was released, it was received with praise by Greek magazines and audiences alike.

Harlafti has taken vocal studies in Greece and Germany (Diploma in classical singing). She received scholarship from the famous English counter tenor Michael Chance to study Early Music. She also holds the London College of Music Diploma Examination in Classical Vocal Studies. She holds a degree of geology from the University of Patras and is currently studying Physical Education and Sport Science at the National and Kapodistrian University of Athens.
