= The Earthbound =

Greek band

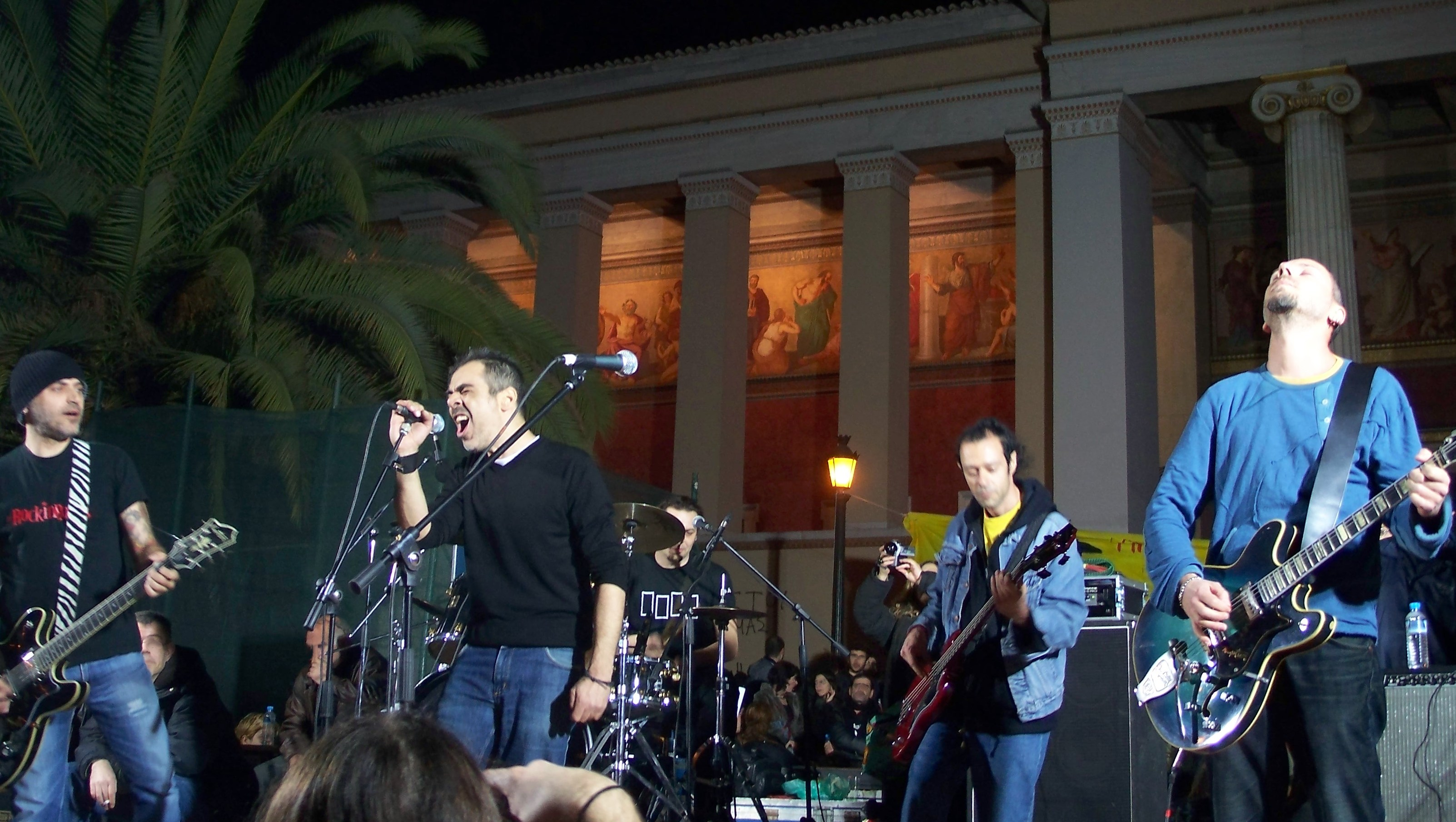
The Earthbound, 2008.

The Earthbound is a Greek band.

The band was formed in Athens in 1998 by six members and former members of The Last Drive, Honeydive, Rockin' Bones and Engine-V, which includes Alexis Kalofolias and Thanos Amorginos. After playing locally for about a year, including a slot in Rockwave festival in 1999, the Earthbound recorded its debut 7" single "The Valley/Riverside Song/Tercera Cancion", released with Fractal Press magazine.

The Earthbound signed to Trade Records and recorded their self-titled debut album produced by their sound-engineer, Jim Spliff. It was released in 2000 and featured 13 songs, including three covers of songs by Kyuss, Woody Guthrie and Guillermo Portaballes that showcased the band's diverse influences.

In 2001, they recorded the soundtrack for the film Stakaman by Antonis Kafetzopoulos, which was released by M Records. At the same period, Alex K and Thanos A worked on the soundtrack for the film SOSE ME (directed by Stratos Tzitzis), released a few months later by Universal (Greece). The Earthbound spent the next eighteen months touring. They also took part in two benefit concerts for the campaign Escuelas para Chiapas (A School for Chiapas) and in June 2003 they played at the demonstration against the EU summit in Thessaloniki. In September 2003 Louis (former member of the historical Athenian punk band Stress) joined on trumpet and percussion.

In 2004, they signed to Sirius (the record label formed by Manos Hadjidakis) and started working on their third album, Brotherhood of the Dog, this time produced by Jim Spliff and the band itself. The album was released later the same year and featured 11 songs (including an Ennio Morricone cover).

In early 2005, they played two gigs in Cyprus and recruited a second trumpet player, Johnny Mato (also member of Dr. Vodkatini and Da Traces). The eight-piece band contributed a track to the Spinalonga records compilation In The Junkyard vol. II and continued touring and writing songs for their next album.

It was finally released in spring of 2008 at the band's own label, LAB Records, under the title La Guerra Final . Including 11 original songs, it is considered by many their best studio effort.

The Earthbound suspended action in summer of 2009.

== Discography ==
- La Guerra Final (2008), Lab Records, produced by Jim Spliff and Thanos Amorginos
- Brotherhood Of The Dog (2004), Sirius Records M41 / CD, produced by Jim Spliff & The Earthbound
- Stakaman O.S.T. (2001), M Records, produced by Jim Spliff & The Earthbound
- The Earthbound (2000), Trade Records, produced by Jim Spliff, co-produced by Aris Christou
- The Earthbound (1999), Underworld D-Tales/ 7, produced by Jim Spliff & The Earthbound
