= Genia tou Chaous =

- Origin: Greece
- Genres: Hardcore Punk
- Years active: 1982–1989, 2009
- Labels: Art Nouveau, Dikaioma Diavasis Records (Di-Di Records), Wipe-Out Records

Genia tou Chaous (Greek: Γενιά του Χάους; Chaos Generation), was a Greek punk band of the 1980s and a prominent band within the Greek underground scene and fanzine culture.

== History ==
The band formed in 1982 in Athens under the original name Αντι-κουλτούρα (Anti-culture) with an original lineup of Nikos Vosdoganis, his cousin of the same name, and Thodoris Iliakopoulos. The band underwent many lineup changes throughout their tenure (see Band Members), with Iliakopoulos as the only constant member.

In 1983, the band renamed themselves Genia tou Chaous or “Chaos Generation” and released their first recorded music: two songs, including their most popular track Bastardokratia (“Bastardocracy”) in a Greek punk compilation album called “Disturbing the Peace” and a split demo Kali Oreksi (“Bon Appetit”) on the Art Nouveau record shop label with fellow punk band Adiexodo. Band member Kostas Hatzopoulos recollected his impressions upon joining the band as “simple distortion taken to the extreme, dynamite lyrics, minimalist musical themes, and pure punk mentality.” The band refused to play Bastardokratia live for a long time because they were bothered by the cliche and narrowminded sloganeering with which some fans approached the song,, which they discussed in contemporary fanzines.

In 1986, they released their self-titled first full length album on Dikaioma Diavasis records (later named Di-Di Records) and followed in 1989 by their second and final release, the more metallic “Requiem for Fallen Gods” before their break-up the same year.

In 1996 their two full-length albums were re-released by Wipe-Out Records. The band also played two reunion concerts in 2009.

== Impact ==
Mainstream Greek radio stations were “under state control and prohibited from playing [Greek punk underground] music”, meaning that the impact of Genia tou Chaous is difficult to assess through traditional metrics of chart success and is more accurately measured through primary sources and informal metrics such as interviews, fanzines, and reviews.

In an edition of the fanzine Rollin Under published in 1986, which contains an interview with two of the band’s members, the interviewer notes that “You are considered a successful group in your genre.” Reviewer Tim Yohannan for American punk fanzine Maximum Rocknroll describes their split demo release in 1986 as follows: “[…]an older punk style and really garagy guitar work; They also do a couple of cleanly produced post-punk gems and one psychotic screamer.”

In addition to this contemporary testimony, modern blogs on the topic of punk in Greece have called them “the most important punk group [in Greece]” and “a classic punk giant of the ‘80s” and also note that Genia tou Chaous was particularly well-known for their live shows, putting on legendary concerts in Thessaloniki in the ‘80s. In an interview with Sotiris Theocharis (a former member of the punk band Dead-End, one of Genia tou Chaous’s contemporaries) agreed that “'Generation of Chaos' is undoubtedly one of the most important groups of the era.”

Blogger and songwriter Φοίβος Δεληβοριάς lists both of Genia tou Chaous’s albums in his list of the “100 Best Greek-Language Rock Albums”, putting “Requiem” at #44 and the self-titled album at #35. The song Bastardokratia has also earned contemporary praise from bloggers, as the “must-listen track” off of “Disturbing the Peace” and “Greek punk's best moment”.

Modern metal band Επιθανάτιος Ρόγχος (“Death Rattle”) took their name from the title of a song by Genia Tou Chaous.

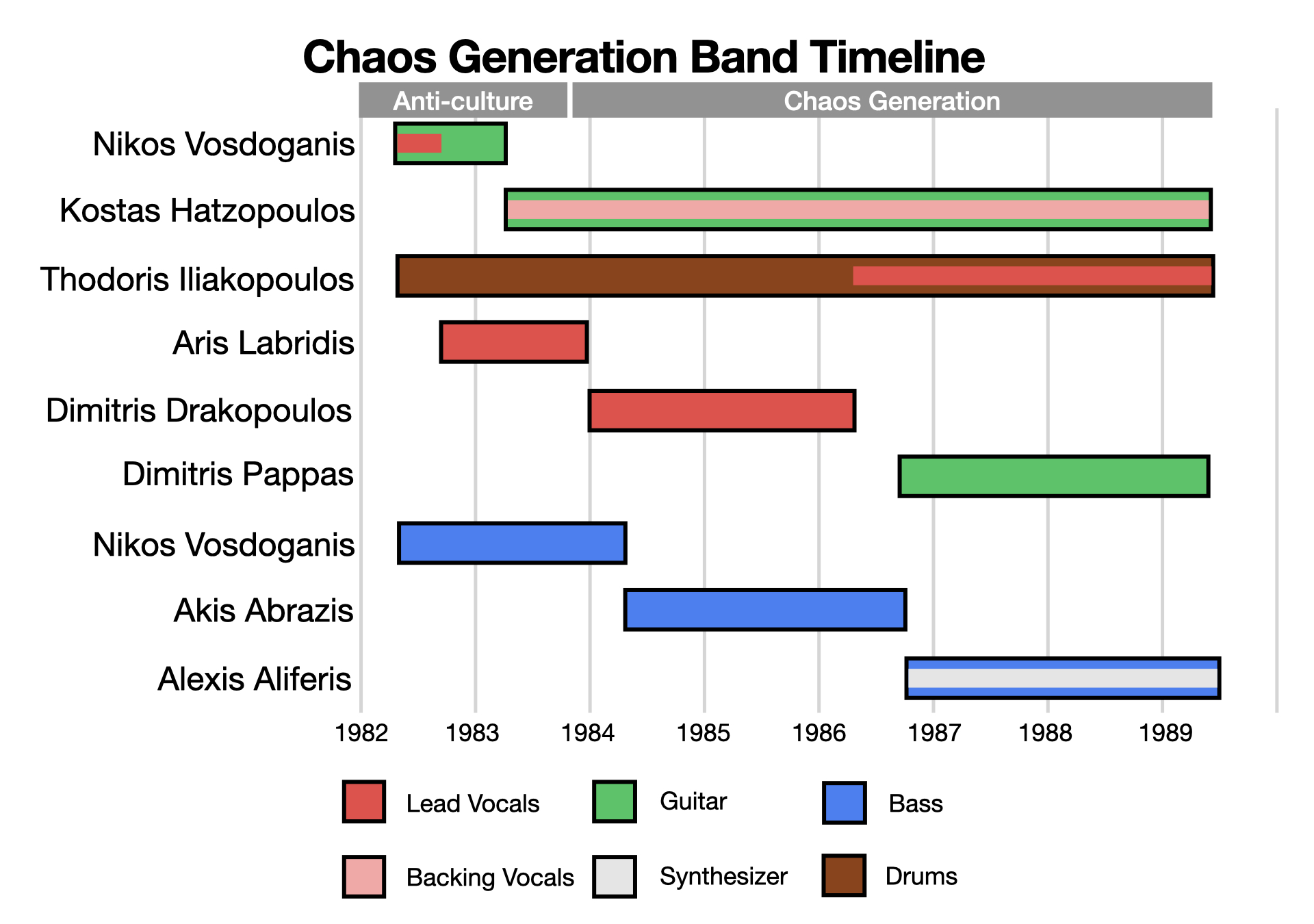
A timeline of the membership of the band Chaos Generation

== Members ==
- Nikos Vosdoganis - guitar
- Nikos Vosdoganis - bass guitar
- Aris Lampidis
- Θοδωρής Ηλιακόπουλος - vocals, drums
- Kostas Harzopoulos - guitar
- Άκης Αμπραζής - bass guitar, vocals
- Αλέξης Αλιφέρης - bass guitar, keyboards
- Δημήτρης Παππάς - guitar, vocals
- Giorgos Drakopoulos - keyboards

== Discography ==
Cover	Title	Notes
	Διατάραξη Kοινής Hσυχίας (Enigma, 1984)	A compilation album of Greek punk bands Two tracks of Genia tou Chaous included; one of them is their famous song "Μπασταρδοκρατία" (Bastardocracy)
N/A	Η Γενιά του Χάους και το Αδιέξοδο σας εύχονται καλή όρεξη	Split demo with the band Αδιέξοδο
	Γενιά του Χάους (Δικαίωμα Διάβασης, 1986)	First album
N/A	Ρέκβιεμ για ξεπεσμένους θεούς (Δικαίωμα Διάβασης, 1989)	Second and final album.
	Ρέκβιεμ (Wipe Out, 1996)	A compilation of the two full-length albums
