= Panx Romana =

Greek punk rock band

- Origin: Greece
- Genres: Punk rock, anarcho-punk
- Years active: 1982-present

Panx Romana is a Greek punk rock band that was formed in 1982 in Athens. Their name is inspired by Pax Romana, i.e. the Roman Peace that sustained Roman imperialism. They are very popular among Greek anarchists and have performed multiple concerts throughout the country mostly at anti-authoritarian venues. Some of their most well known songs include Διακοπές στο Χακί (Diakopes sto Chaki) "Vacation while wearing Khaki (lit. in Khaki)", Ράδιο Κατάληψη (Radio Katalipsi) "Radio Occupation", Το Γράμμα (To Gramma) "The Letter", and Το Μυστικό Πάρτυ (To mystiko party) "The Secret Party".

== Band members ==
- Frank: vocals, lyrics
- Woody: guitar
- Δημήτρης Δημητράκας (Dimitris Dimitrakas): drums
- Χρήστος Αθανασάκος (Christos Athanasakos): Μουσική: bass

== Discography ==
- Παιδιά στα όπλα (Paidia Sta Opla) "Kids to Arms" (1987)
- Αντάρτες πόλεων (Andartes Poleon) "Urban Guerillas" (1989)
- Σπάσε τη γραμμή (Spase ti Grammi) "Break the Line" (1993)
- Διαγωγή Κοσμία (EP) (Diagogi Kosmia) "Decent Demeanor" (1996)
- Κράτος κλειστόν (Kratos Kleiston) "State: Closed" (1999)
- Pax Americana (2016)
