= Yannis Spathas =

Greek guitarist (1950–2019)

- Born: 30 November 1950; Paxos, Greece
- Died: 6 July 2019 (aged 68) Cholargos, Greece
- Instrument: Guitar

Yannis Spathas (30 November 1950 – 6 July 2019) was a Greek guitarist, founding member of the rock band Socrates Drank the Conium (or simply Socrates), and one of the most famous Greek electric guitar players.

== Biography ==
Born in 1950 in Paxos, Yannis came in contact with music through his father and uncles and he learned how to play various instruments. He grew up in Pireas, where he formed the band Persons (1966-1969), with Antonis Tourkogiorgis and Ilias Asvestopoulos, and later on formed the Socrates band again with Tourkogiorgis.

In 1983, after the split of the Socrates band, Spathas collaborated as an orchestra guitarist with artists. In 1999 he released his first personal album, in which Haris Alexiou participated. According to Spathas, his greatest influences were Jimi Hendrix and Anastasios Chalkias.
