= Locomondo =

Greek band

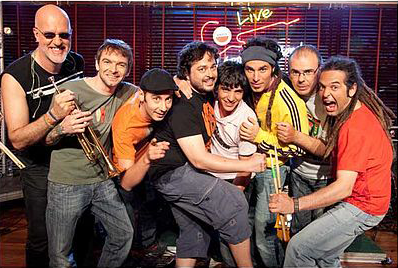
- Locomondo (Photo by Delia Woehlert, courtesy of Amstel)

Background information
- Origin: Athens, Greece
- Genres: Ska, Reggae
- Years active: 2003 – Present
- Label: Music Box international
- Members: Markos Koumaris; Yiannis Varnavas; Stamatis Goulas; Spyros Mpesdekis; Stratos Sountris
- Website: https://locomondo.gr/el

Locomondo is one of the most known and successful bands in Greece.

The band fronted by Markos Koumaris, the main songwriter and composer of the group, fuses reggae, ska and Caribbean sounds with Greek lyrics and Greek traditional musical elements.

== Career ==
- They have released 8 albums, including Locomondo Live!, an album which turned gold in December 2011. Two of their video clips have received the "Best Alternative Video Clip" award from Mad-TV Greece (in 2007 and 2010).
- Locomondo is the most known Reggae band in Greece, as well as the only Greek group that has recorded in Jamaica. This happened in 2005, when the band followed an invitation of ex Skatalites trombonist and Studio One legend Vin Gordon to the "island in the sun" and recorded the album "12 meres stin Jamaica" (12 days in Jamaica). The album contained two songs that meant to be great hits in Greece, but also attracted attention beyond the Greek borders.
- The first was a reggae cover of the Rembetiko song Frangosyriani composed in 1935 by the legendary Markos Vamvakaris.
  Taking notice of this interesting musical mixture the German film director, screenwriter and producer of Turkish descent Fatih Akin included the song in his Venice Film Festival Special Jury Prize winning film Soul kitchen in 2009, and used it as the soundtrack for the red carpet event of his film.
- The second hit of this album was Den kani kryo stin Ellada (its not cold in Greece), a hymn to a positive way of thinking. The song's chorus became a slogan in Greece and is considered the band's most known song.
- In the next album “Me wanna dance” the band collaborated with Spanish singer Amparo Sanchez (Amparanoia) in Barcelona and Natty Bo (Ska Cubano) in Athens.
- In 2010 Locomondo recorded "Goal", a romantic song about football, which turned out to be an unofficial soundtrack for the Greece National Football Team qualifying for the second time in its history in the final phase of the World Cup. The video clip of the song featured Greece national player Dimitris Salpingidis who scored the qualifying goal against Ukraine. Although the Greek team disqualified in the first round in South Africa, the band considered it as a strike of luck as Salpingidis scored against Nigeria in the 2nd match, becoming the first player to ever score for Greece in a World Cup final phase.
- In 2012 the Italian rap band Club Dogo released the single titled P.E.S. which was based on Locomondo's song “Pro” and reached platinum. The song became a summer hit in Italy. The album containing the song P.E.S. became platinum as well.
- In 2015 Turkish singer Ziynet Sali Ziynet Sali releases a Turkish version of Locomondo's song “Magiko Hali” which achieves respectable success .
- In 2017 Locomondo collaborate with Spanish singer-songwriter Tonino Carotone and release the song "La Mulata". A song that Locomondo frontman, Markos Koumaris, and Tonino Carotone co-wrote.
- In 2019 Vinyl Is Back chooses to record Locomondo live at one of their shows to later release a collectable vinyl record titled "Vinyl Is Back Live Sessions Vol.2". On the same year, the band releases two albums at the same time. The album "Star" in their homeland Greece and the album "Radio" in Germany. Both albums have a very similar track list. The band's summer tour of 2019 was the most successful in their history.
- In March 2020 the band performed on a well known Greek show named Stin Ygeia Mas (Στην Υγειά Μας).

== Other interesting facts ==
- In 2007 the band collaborated with Greek American director Christine Crokos, composing and recording the sound track for the comedy "Gamilio Party" (wedding party). The film sold over 250.000 tickets and the song "Gamilio Party" became one of the most beloved wedding songs.
- They have shared the stage with artists and bands such as Manu Chao, Patti Smith, the Wailers, Alpha Blondy, the Skatalites, Chumbawamba, Culture, Mad Professor, Amparanoia, Ojos de Brujo, Ojos de Brujo, Tonino Carotone, Shantel, Aswad, Thievery Corporation and Ska Cubano among others.
- In 2010 the Band recorded a reggae cover of the popular German song Griechischer Wein (Greek wine) of the Austrian composer and singer Udo Jürgens. The song was produced by Marco Baresi, drummer of the Far East Band that used to play for German Reggae star Gentleman, and is included in Locomondo's release "Locomondo- Best of".
- The band has supported a lot of environmental and humanitarian organizations in the past such as Greenpeace, Amnesty International, A21 and the Greek homeless street paper “Shedia”.
- In their recordings, the band uses a great variety of Greek traditional musical instruments such as bouzuki, baglama, violin, Gaida, Tsampouna (Greek bagpipe), Kaval, Santouri, Cretan Lyra and Laud which gave the Caribbean sound a special Mediterranean touch.
- Many of their songs are autobiographical, with the highlight of their hit “Pro”, referring to Markos passion for “pro evolution soccer” in mid ‘00s, a game he used to play with Ambelogarden legend Martinos
- Today the band is working together with Dimitris Gasias (Violin), Christos Spiliopoulos (trombone), Nikos "Tattoo" (trumpet) and Christos Kalaitzopoulos (akkordeon)

== Band members ==
=== Band members in each category ===
==== Current ====
- Markos Koumaris - Vocals/Guitar
- Yiannis Varnavas - Guitar/Vocals
- Spyros Mpesdekis - Bass
- Stamatis Goulas - Keyboards/Sampler/Vocals
- Stratos Angelos Soundris - Drums
- Thanasis Tampakis - Sound Engineer

==== Current additional musicians ====
- Christos Terrõne Kalaitzopoulos - Accordion
- Christos Spiliopoulos - Trombone
- Panos Kapetanakis - Trumpet
- Nikos Tattoo Vlahos - Trumpet
- Thanos Tsakiltzidis - Saxophone
- Dimitris Gasias - Violin

==== Former members and additional musicians ====
- Stefanos Psaradakis - Drums
- Alkiviadis Konstantopoulos - Trombone
- Sotiris Pepelas - Trumpet
- Antonis Andreou - Trombone
- Manos Theodosakis - Trumpet
- Giorgos Makris - Gaida / Kaval
- Natassa Mindrinou - Vocals
- Mike Mourtzis - Percussion
- Vasilis Panagiotopoulos - Trombone

=== Band members information ===
| Member name | Musical instrument | Joining year | Latest year |
|---|---|---|---|
| Markos Koumaris | Vocals, Guitar | 2003 | 2026 |
| Giannis Varnavas | Vocals, Guitar | 2003 | 2026 |
| Stamatis Goulas | Keyboard, Sampler, Vocals | 2003 | 2026 |
| Spyros Besdekis | Bass | 2003 | 2026 |
| Stratos Aggelos Sountris | Drums | 2005 | 2026 |
| Thanasis Spoggos Tambakis | Sound Engineer | 2003 | 2026 |
| Stefanos Psaradakis | Drums | 2003 | 2005 |
| Antonis Andreou | Trombone | 2006 | 2009 |
| Manos Theodosakis | Trumpet | 2006 | 2009 |
| Alkiviadis Konstantopoulos | Trombone | 2004 | 2005 |
| Sotiris Pepelas | Trumpet | 2004 | 2005 |
| Giorgos Makris | Gaida | 2007 | 2009 |
| Natassa Mindrinou | Vocals | 2005 | 2009 |
| Christos Terrõne Kalaitzopoulos | Accordion , Vocals | 2015 | 2026 |
| Mike Mourtzis | Percussion , Vocals | 2005 | 2014 |
| Dimitris Gasias | Violin | 2007 | 2026 |
| Panos Kapetanakis | Trumpet | 2022 | 2026 |
| Christos Spiliopoulos | Trombone | 2015 | 2026 |
| Nikos Tattoo Vlahos | Trumpet | 2009 | 2026 |
| Thanos Tsakiltzidis | Saxophone | 2022 | 2026 |
| Vasilis Panagiotopoulos | Trombone | 2009 | 2014 |

== Discography ==
- 2004 Enas Trelos Kosmos (A crazy world)
- 2005 12 Meres Jamaica (12 days in Jamaica)
- 2007 Me wanna dance
- 2008 Gamilio Party (OST) (The wedding party)
- 2009 Locomondo Live
- 2010 Goal (digital single)
- 2011 Locomondo Best Of
- 2013 Οδύσσεια
- 2013 New Day Rising
- 2014 Se Eida
- 2015 I Mirtia
- 2016 To Bee Or Not To Bee
- 2017 80s
- 2019 Star
- 2019 Radio
