= Libido Blume =

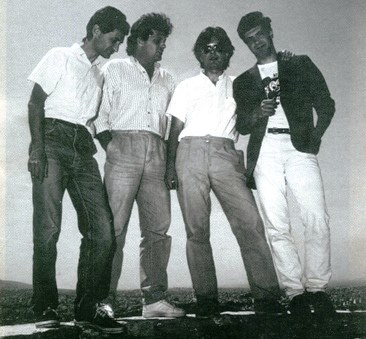
- Libido Blume Official Photo circa 1986

Background information
- Genres: Post Punk, New Wave
- Years active: 1985–1988
- Past members: Akis Boyatzis, Dimitris Bouroussas, Yannis Drenoyannis, Tasos Katsaris, Dimitris Stergiou, Stelios Habipis

Libido Blume were a post punk/new wave band from Athens, Greece. They were part of the Athenian underground rock scene of the '80s and '90s. The band was founded by Akis Boyatzis, Dimitirs Bouroussas and Yiannis Drenoyiannis in 1985, from the remnants of Akis Boyatzis' Cpt.Nefos. Later on Tasos Katsaris joined the band.

Libido Blume's music was a mix of garage nostalgia, electro-pop, electro-funk and post-punk. They represented Greece at the 1986 Biennale for young Artists, a European festival of the Arts, in Thessaloniki, side by side with other important Greek Bands of the time such as No Man's Land.

They released two LP Albums and one EP. Jon Langford (of The Mekons and The Three Johns) produced their final LP, Liquid Situation, in 1987." After the band split up, Bogiatzis created Sigmatropic and Drenogiannis created Yeah!, two well known and well respected bands of the local Athenian scene.

On December 12, 2015, Libido Blume reunited and joined legendary Greek Bands Choris Peridereo, No Man's Land and Cpt Nefos on stage, at the 80's Live Performances Portion of the "Vinyl is Back" Vinyl Festival, which took place at Cine Keramikos stage.

== Discography ==
1. Colours Melting, Vinyl LP (Athens 1986)
Akis Boyiatzis - Vocal, Bass
Yiannis Drenoyiannis-Guitars
Tasos Katsaris-Sax, Keyboards
Dimitris Bourousas-Drums, Linn drum

Additional Personnel
Dimitris Stergiou - Piano
Alexis Metaxas-Backing Vocals
Iakovos Manis-Guitars
Stefanos Laretzakis-Percussions

Sound Engineer-Manolis Vlahos (In Recording Studio, Athens)
Release: Feb 1986
Label: Dikeoma Diavasis Records, Athens

2. Brilliant names and dames, Vinyl EP (Athens 1987)
Akis Boyiatzis - Vocal, Bass
Dimitris Stergiou - Keyboards
Stelios Habipis - Guitars
Dimitris Bourousas-Drums
Alexis Metaxas-Backing Vocals

Sound Engineer-Kostas Arniotis (Studio 111, Athens)
Release: Jan 1987
Label: Dikeoma Diavasis Records, Athens

3.Liquid Situation, Vinyl LP (Athens 1988)
Akis Boyiatzis - Vocal, Bass
Dimitris Stergiou - Keyboards
Stelios Habipis - Guitars
Makis Vrettos - Drums
JonBoy Langford - Bass, Bottle on Intoxicated

Sound Engineer-Kostas Stratigopoulos (Mini Farm Studio, Athens)
All Tracks Remixed & Produced by Jon Langford
Release: Jan 1988
Label: Di-Di Records, Athens
