= The Last Drive =

Greek punk garage rock band

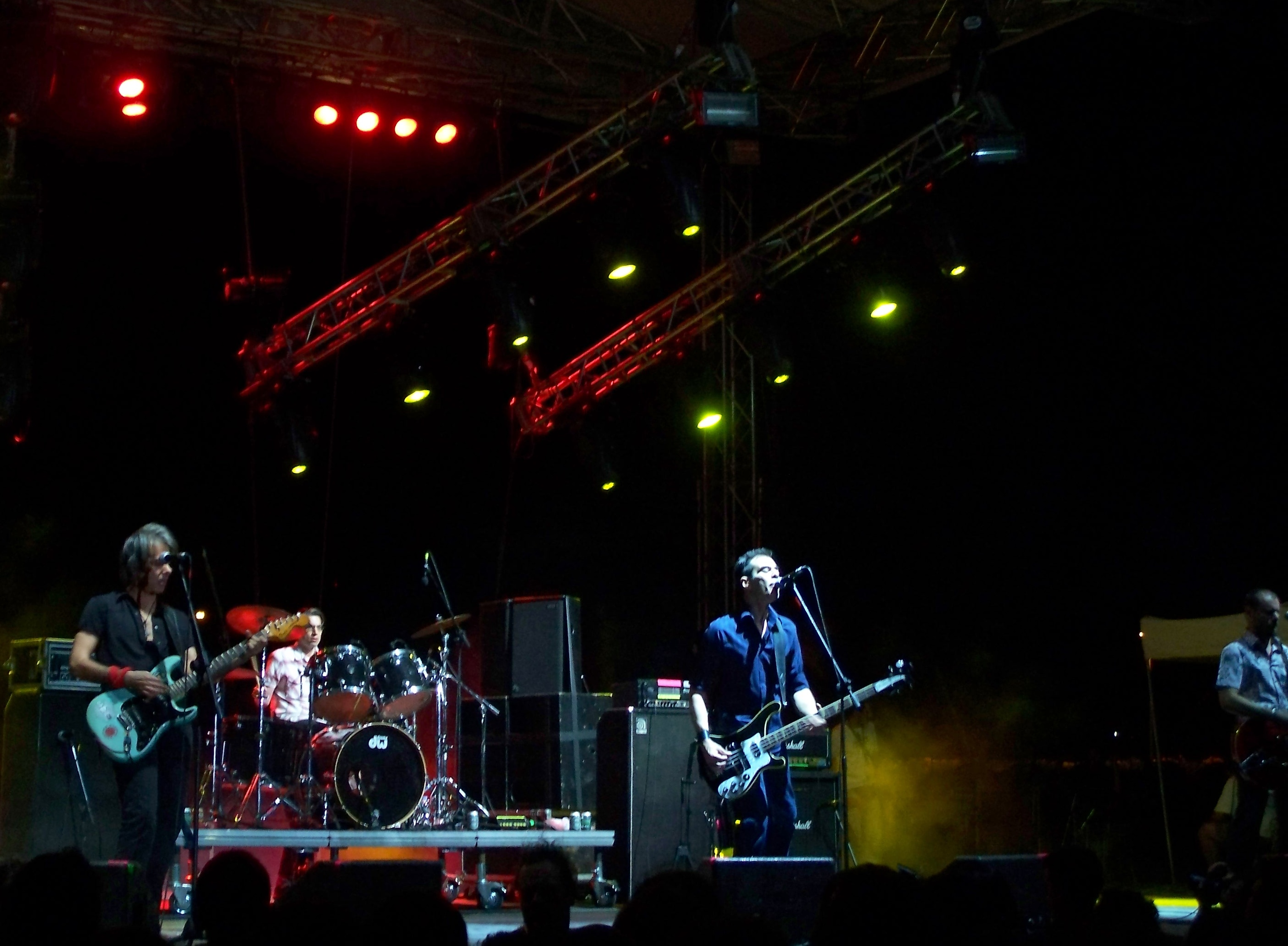
Live at Open Air festival, July 6, 2007

The Last Drive is a Greek punk garage rock group. They formed in 1983, broke up in 1995, and reunited in January 2007.

== History ==
=== 1983-1987: The beginnings ===
The Last Drive began performing as "Last Drive" in late 1983, with their debut show at Rodeo Club on December 27 of the same year. They adopted the name "Last Drive" after noticing a cocktail by that name at a bar menu. During 1984, Yiorgos Karanikolas joined the group under the role of the lead guitarist. Their music blended garage rock mixed with rockabilly and surf rock music genres. They began performing at underground clubs during that era, while some band members played with Blue Light (group) at their first live performance at Pegasus club. Their first release, the 7" single "Midnite Hop", came out in 1985 and is now highly coveted by collectors in Greece. They also participated with a song in a compilation tape by Dikaioma Diavasis records, Live at the Kyttaro Club. In 1986, they released their full-length LP album Underworld Shakedown. The content and the quality of production (by the Drive themselves) was considered unusually high for the standards of the independent scene of that time. Their LP included covers of garage standards like Misirlou and Night of the Phantom, along with their original compositions.

=== 1987-1990: Europe ===
They continued to appear live in Athens and many other cities in Greece, and in the spring of 1987 they toured abroad for the first time, in Germany, Italy, France and the Netherlands. They performed alongside the Fuzztones, the Creeps, the Stomachmouths, the Dizzy Satellites and others. In 1988, having replaced Nick "Pop Mind" with Panos Kasiaris on rhythm guitar, they released Heatwave, which was produced by Peter Zaremba of the Fleshtones. That was the album that brought them to the attention of Music Maniac Records, a German label specializing in garage-rock releases, which re-released it with a new cover. This release brought them to Germany, where they participated in the Berlin Independence Days festival and also recorded the Time EP.

By this time the garage sound of the group had started to shift, becoming harder and speedier and moving towards stoner rock and neo-psychedelia. The band also caught the eye of Paul B. Cutler, of Dream Syndicate fame, who would produce their next two records.

=== 1990-1995 ===
Their 1990 LP, Blood Nirvana, signified a shift in their sound. This change disappointed some of their dedicated garage fans and resulted in the end of their collaboration with Music Maniac. During the early 1990s, they were perceived as a part of the "explosion" of the hard rock/indie Greek scene, which led to increased popularity among rock fans in Greece. The same year, they were voted "band of the year" by readers of the leading music magazine, Pop & Rock. They played as a support act for the Wipers, The Jesus and Mary Chain, The Gun Club, and toured Germany with Dead Moon. Their most mature work, the F*head Entropy album, was released in 1992. The Last Drive commemorated their 10th anniversary and completed a tour in Spain with a live performance (including a pie fight) at the "West Club" on December 23, 1993. Their contract with Hitch Hyke Records, their long-time record label, ended in 1994. They signed with the multinational BMG Hellas and released Subliminal, an album featuring songs with a slower tempo than previous works. In 1995, Karanikolas departed from the band and relocated to the United States. Several months later, the Last Drive disbanded after twelve years of touring and establishing a strong fan base in Greece and other countries with their dynamic live performances.

== 1995-2007: Intermission ==
Yiorgos Karanikolas created the band Blackmail, who generally picked up from where the Drive had stopped, but with a greater emphasis on neo-psychedelia, and became quite popular at the time.

Alex Kalofolias and Thanos Amorginos created The Earthbound in 1998, a band with a completely different orientation around ethnic/Latin/desert rock. There have been rare instances in which The Earthbound were joined on stage by former Drive members. Kalofolias and Amorginos also co-wrote the music for Stratos Tzitzis' film Sose me (Save me). Amorginos also wrote music for theatrical plays.

Chris Michalatos played with The Speedballs a rockabilly act, for a while.

=== 2007-present ===
In early 2007, the band announced on their official website their reunion for some gigs. They performed live in Athens on May 11, 12 and 13th -all three dates being sold out- in Thessaloniki on the 19th and in Larissa on June 2.

Their first record ("Midnite Hop") was re-released by Greek DIY label Blind Bastard Records. They also played at the "Open Air Festival" in Athens on July 6. Finally, they were the headliners on the first day of the "Indie Rocket Festival 2007" (along with the Devastations, Acid Cobra and The Cesarians) that took place in Pescara, Italy on June 22 . In May 2008, the band did another Greek tour, while a live CD-DVD covering their reunion shows in Athens was released by Blind Bastard Records. In 2009, a documentary film titled 20000 Miles Ahead: A Last Drive Story was released, which covered their story leading up to the reunion gigs. That same year, a new CD called "Heavy Liquid" was released. In September 2009, Inner Ear released it as a limited edition LP (500 black vinyls and 500 red vinyls). In April 2010, an art and comics anthology titled "At The Drive Ink" was published, featuring artwork by 31 Greek artists inspired by the songs from "Heavy Liquid". In October 2010, the band contributed the track "Love & Terror" to the CD/booklet "Horror & Romance." The compilation consisted of songs and music inspired by Stefanos Rokos' art exhibition. In June 2012, the band released a new EP titled "News from Nowhere." Shortly after, the guitar player, Thanos Amorginos, was replaced by Stefanos Flotsios. Since reforming, the band has been touring Greece annually.

== Members ==
- Alexis Kalofolias (Alex K.) - ripper bass, vocals
- Yiorgos Karanikolas (B.George Bop) - lead guitar, vocals
- Christos Michalatos (Chris B.I.) - drums
- Stefanos Flotsios - guitar

ex-members

- Nikos Kapetanopoulos (Nick "Pop Mind") - guitar
- Panos Kasiaris (P.PEP) - guitar
- Thanos Amorginos (T.H. Lime) - guitar

== Discography ==
=== In Greece ===
Singles/EPs

- Midnite Hop (7", Art Nouveau 1985)
- I Was A Teenage Zombie (with the Fleshtones as "The Pleasure Hustlers") (Time Bomb: The Fleshtones present the Big Bang Theory, Hitch Hyke 1989)
- Time (12" EP, Hitch Hyke 1989)
- Overloaded (7" single sided promo, Hitch Hyke 1991)
- News From Nowhere (12'ep, Happy Crasher Records / Inner Ear, 2012)

LPs

- Underworld Shakedown (Hitch Hyke 1986)
- Heatwave (Hitch Hyke 1988)
- Blood Nirvana (Hitch Hyke 1990)
- F*Head Entropy (Hitch Hyke 1992)
- Subliminal (BMG 1994)
- The Bad Roads | The Best Of The Last Drive (Columbia 2007)
- Time Is Not Important (Live DVD-CD [shot and recorded at their 2007 reunion shows @ Athens], Blind Bastard Records 2008 )
- Heavy Liquid (Happy Crasher Records 2009)
- The Last Drive (The Lab/Labyrinth of Thoughts, 2018)

Contribs

- (Live sto Kyttaro, Dikaioma Diavasis 1985)
- May This Bullet (The Thing From Another World Volume 1, The Thing magazine 1995)
- Chain Train; Gone Gone Gone (Rock Fm - Rodon:Live, Music Box 1991 (LP)/2000 (CD))
- Jailbird; Outlaw (Local Heroes '95 Comp., Pop & Rock mag.)
- Love & Terror ("Horror & Romance" Compilation, 2010)

=== Abroad ===
Singles/EPs

- Blue Moon / Every Night / Sidewalk Stroll (7", Voxx 1987)

LPs

- Heatwave (LP, Music Maniac 1988)
- Their Story So Far (Underworld Shakedown + Heatwave) (CD, Music Maniac 1989)
- Blood Nirvana (Romilar D 1991)
- Blood Nirvana (LP/CD, Music Maniac 1991)
- Blood Nirvana (CD, Restless 1992, bonus "Time Has Come Today" alternative mix)

Contribs

- Every Night (Battle of the Garages Vol. 4, Voxx 1986)
- Valley of Death (The sounds of now, Dionysus 1986)
- I love Cindy (The secret team, Voxx 1988)
- Hell to pay (Music Maniac Gimmick Comp., 1989)
- Black Limo (The monster dance hall favorites vol. 3, Munster 1990)
- Overloaded (It's a Restless World, Restless 1991)
- The End Inc. (Larsen/Zine Comp. 1993)
- Outlaw (Enclosed Please Find... Your Invitation To Suicide: A Tribute to the Songs of Martin Rev & Alan Vega Double LP, Munster 1994)
