= Kanto (music) =

Popular genre of Turkish music

- Other names: Cantare music
- Stylistic origins: Italian music; Turkish music; Greek music; Armenian music
- Cultural origins: 1900s, Turkey

Kanto (Turkish: kanto) is a popular genre of Turkish music.

== Terminology ==
Italian opera and theater had a profound effect on Turkish culture during the early 20th century. The terminology of music and theater derived from Italian. In the argot of the improvisational theater of Istanbul the stage was called sahano, backstage was referred to as koyuntu, backdrops depicting countryside as bosko, the applause as furi, and the songs sung as solos or duets between the acts and plays were called kanto. As was the case with their Italian counterparts, the Turkish troupe members played songs and music before the show and between the acts to pique people's interest and draw in customers. Kanto were based on traditional eastern makam but performed with Western instruments.

== Theatrical origins ==
The improvised theatrical pieces were stage adaptations of the Karagöz (shadow puppet) and Orta Oyunu (form of Turkish theatre performed in the open air) traditions, although in a simplified form. The themes explored in these traditional theater arts (as well as their stereotypes) were used as the framework for the new extemporaneous performances of the tuluat ("improvised") theater. In this way, kanto may be considered as the unifying feature of all tuluat theater.

== Periods ==
Kanto is usually divided into two periods. The division, particularly in terms of musical structure, is clear between the early kanto (1900s–1923) and the kanto of the Post-Republican period (especially after the mid-1930s). It is further possible to identify two styles within the early period: Galata and Direklerarası (after the neighbourhoods of Old Istanbul).

=== Early period: 1900s–mid-1930s ===
The early period kanto tradition was nourished in Istanbul. The same was also true in the Post-Republican period. The city's large and diverse population provided the themes that were the mainstay of kanto. Kanto was heavily influenced by musical theatre, Balkan and Byzantine or Anatolian music (Karsilamas) (which was however often a subject of satire in kanto songs) and Greek music (Kalamatiano, Ballos, Syrtos) (especially the Istanbul Rum who were so fond of urban forms of entertainment). In other words, kanto was the result of cultural exchange and almost all the early kanto singers were either Rum or Armenian: Pepron, Karakas, Haim, Shamiram Kelleciyan, and Peruz Terzekyan (all of them performed during the period following 1903).

==== Galata and Direklerarası ====
Galata was the part of Istanbul where sailors, rowdies, and roustabouts used to frequent. Ahmet Rasim Bey gives a vivid picture of the Galata theaters in his novel Fuhs-i Akit "An Old Whore":

"Everyone thought Peruz was the most flirtatious, most skillful and the most provocative. The seats closest to the stage were always crammed full... They said of Peruz, 'she is a trollop who has ensnared the heart of many a young man and has made herself the enemy of many. 'Her songs would hardly be finished when chairs, flowers, bouquets and beribboned letters. Come flying from the boxseats. It seemed the building would be shaken to the ground."

Direklerarası in comparison to Galata was a more refined center of entertainment. Direklerarası was said to be quite lively at night during the month of Ramadan (or Ramazan in Turkish). It was there that the troupes of Kel Hasan and Abdi Efendi and later that of Neshid gained popularity. Under the influence of these masters kanto had its golden years.

The troupes' orchestras featured instruments such as the trumpet, the trombone, the violin, the trap drum and cymbals. The orchestra would start to play contemporary popular songs and marches about an hour before the beginning of main show. This intermission music ended up with the well known İzmir Marşı (Izmir March); a sign that the show time was approaching. The play began as soon as the musicians had taken their places at the side of the stage.

MIDI rendition of song, Izmir March

Prominent artists include: Peruz, Shamran, Kamelya, Eleni, Küçük and Büyük Amelya, Mari Ferha and Virjin.

==== 1923–mid-1930s: decline in popularity ====
After the 1923 formation of the Turkish Republic, there were changes in the cultural life of Turkey. It was a period of rapid transformation and its effects were widespread. Turkish women had finally won the freedom to appear on the stage, breaking the monopoly previously held by Rûm (Istanbul Greek) and Armenian women who performed both in musical and non-musical theatre. Institutions such as Darulbedayi (Istanbul City Theatre) and Darulelhan (Istanbul Conservatory of Music) had trained musicians that turned out to work as kanto artists.

Before the 1930s, Western lifestyle and western art had put pressure on the traditional Turkish formats which were marginalized. The operetta, the tango and later the charleston, and the foxtrot overshadowed kanto. Kanto's popularity began to fade, the centers of entertainment shifted and the theaters of Galata and Direklerarası were eventually closed. Turkish female artists who were not receptive to kanto's typical ribaldry chose to turn away from it.

==== Themes ====
The kanto singers of this period were also composers. The songs had simple melodies combined with lyrics that described the tensions between men and women, or explored love themes, or just reflected local events of the time. The compositions were in well-known makams such as Rast, Hüzzam, Hicaz, Hüseyni and Nihavent. Kanto songs are remembered both by the names of their interpreters and their creators.

=== Late 1930s and beyond ===
There occurred a new change of trends after the late 1930s: there was a revival of interest in the kanto form. Although rather far from its fundamental principles a new type of kanto was once again popular. Kanto was not anymore exclusively limited to stage performances; there began to exist records produced in studios. While the lyrics began to include satirical takes on contemporary cultural trends and fashion. The songs were recorded with the 78 rpm phonograph. Columbia was the leading record label that commissioned kanto from Kaptanzade Ali Rıza Bey, Refik Fersan, Dramalı Hasan, Sadettin Kaynak, Cümbüş Mehmet and Mildan Niyazi Bey. The makams were the same but the instrumentation had changed. Kanto were now accompanied by cümbüş (a fretlees banjo-like instrument) the ud (a fretless lute), and calpara (castanets). Foxtrot, charleston, and rumba rhythms were combined with the typical kanto forms.

Female soloists from this period include: Makbule Enver, Mahmure, and Neriman; Beşiktaşlı Kemal Senman was the most sought after male singer for duets.

==== Themes ====
Among the themes explored by the new kantocu (singer(s) or composer(s) of kanto), the most frequent subject of satire was the new role of women after the formation of the Republic. Songs like "Sarhoş Kızlar" (Drunken Girls) or "Şoför Kadınlar" (Female Drivers) were written in revenge for all the suffering women had endured at the hands of men in the past. Other songs with similar themes include "Daktilo" (The Typewriter) (which brought to mind the newly formed Secretaires Society), "Bereli Kız" (The Girl with the Beret), "Kadın Asker", and "Olursa" (If Women Were Soldiers).

=== Contemporary use of the term ===
Kanto had a tremendous impact on contemporary Turkish popular music. However, the word Kanto eventually became more of a generalized umbrella term than a precise definition of a musical genre. Any tune that does not follow any conventions, or any song that appealed to the trends and tastes of the time it is released is labeled kanto. Any music instrumented in a novel way is also labeled kanto.

Nurhan Damcıoğlu is an example of a contemporary (post 1980s) artist labeled as a kanto singer.

=== Rhythms ===
Most rebetiko songs are based on traditional Greek or Anatolian dance rhythms. Most common are:

- Syrtos, a general name for many Greek dances (including the Nisiotika), (mostly a 4/4 meter in various forms)
- Zeibekiko, a 9/4 or a 9/8 meter, in its various forms
- Sirtaki, including various kinds of Greek music. It is also the fast version of Chasapiko (like 4/4 and 2/4 meter)
- Hasapiko, a 4/4 meter and the fast version Hasaposerviko in a 2/4 meter
- Antikristos or Karsilamas and Argilamas (a 9/8 meter)
- Kamilierikos, a 9/8 meter) and Aptalikos, broken down in two sixteenths, (slow version a 9/4 and fast version a 9/16 meter in various forms)
- Tsifteteli, a dance of women, (a 4/4)

External videos
- Bana Derler Fındık Kurdu(Karşılama)
- Kabağıda Boynuma Takarım (Çiftetelli)
- Bilbil Turkish Armenian 78 RPM No 5 Babosh Oushak Canto Vahan Boyajian
- Columbia Turkish 78RPM 32001 F Vahan Boyajian Telegrafin Telerine canto
- Odeon Turkish 78RPM Hazam Canto Bana Ne oldou ben bilemem haffouz Aschir Effendi
- Kantolar © 1998 Kalan Müzik
- Hicâz Bûselik Yahudi Kantosu - CD 2

== See also ==
- Cantata
- Arabesque music
- Rebetiko
- Laïkó
- Longa (Middle Eastern music)
- Fasıl
- Amalia Bakas
