= Loulouvikos =

Loulovikos (Greek: Λουλοβίκος or Λουλουβίκος) is a male dance from Megara Attikis, Greece. It is danced to a song with the same name. The song's lyrics refer to Loulouvikos (which is believed to be the name of a boat) which took away the young men from the village. The song pleads with Loulouvikos to bring the young men back.

The dance is similar to a Sta Tria dance with the exception that during the chorus the men dancing begin to do squats and move around in the circle doing up to 20 squats at a time. The dance sometimes finishes off with the men breaking off from the circle and ending up pushing each other to see who will "fall" as the song refers to it. It is a playful dance done during the Apokries ("carnival") season.

== See also ==
- Greek music
- Greek dances
- Greek folk music
- Ikariotikos
- Kalamatianos
- Syrtos
- Sousta
