= Irini Konitopoulou-Legaki =

Greek singer (1931–2022)

Irini Konitopoulou-Legaki Ειρήνη Κονιτοπούλου-Λεγάκη
- Born: Irini Konitopoulou; 15 December 1931; Keramoti, Naxos, Greece
- Died: 28 March 2022 (aged 90) Athens, Greece
- Genres: Folk
- Occupation: Singer
- Instrument: Vocals

Irini Konitopoulou-Legaki (Greek: Ειρήνη Κονιτοπούλου-Λεγάκη; 15 December 1931 – 28 March 2022) was a Greek singer of Nisiotika.

== Biography ==
Konitopoulou-Legaki was born in Keramoti, Naxos, on 15 December 1931. She was the daughter of prominent violinist Michalis Konitopoulos and Maria Fyrogenis. Of the 11 children of the family, five survived: Irini, Giorgos, Kostas, Angeliki and Vangelis.

In 1951, she settled in Athens and became especially known for the collaboration of the National Radio Foundation (EIR) with Simon Karas.

In 1955, Konitopoulou-Legaki married Stelios Legakis and they had four children. Together with her brother Giorgos Konitopoulos and her daughter Eleni Legaki, they charted an important course in the field of Nisiotika.

Konitopoulou-Legaki died aged 90 on March 28, 2022.
