= Nisiotika =

Music genre and type of dance

Nisiotika (Greek: νησιώτικα, meaning "insular (songs)") are the songs and dances of the Aegean islands with a variety of styles. Outside of Greece, it is played in the diaspora in countries such as Turkey, Australia, the United States and elsewhere.

The lyre is the dominant folk instrument along with the laouto, violin, tsampouna, and souravli with widely varying Greek characteristics. The lyre and violin are typically played in a microtonal manner through the usage of specific articulations and string bending in order to achieve the correct intervals in modes such as Rast, Ussak and Beyati.

Representative musicians and performers of nisiotika include: Mariza Koch, credited with reviving the field in the 1970s, Yiannis Parios, Domna Samiou and the Konitopoulos family (Giorgos and Vangelis Konitopoulos, Eirini, Nasia and Stella Konitopoulou).

There are also prominent elements of Cretan music on the Dodecanese Islands and Cyclades.

== Notable artists ==
=== Composers ===
- Giorgos Konitopoulos
- Vangelis Konitopoulos
- Stathis Koukoularis
- Yiannis Parios
- Nikos Ikonomidis
- Stamatis Hatzopoulos

=== Singers ===
- Glykeria
- Vagelis Konitopoulos
- Stella Konitopoulou
- Yiannis Parios
- Domna Samiou
- Mariza Koch
- Nasia Konitopoulou

== Folk dances ==
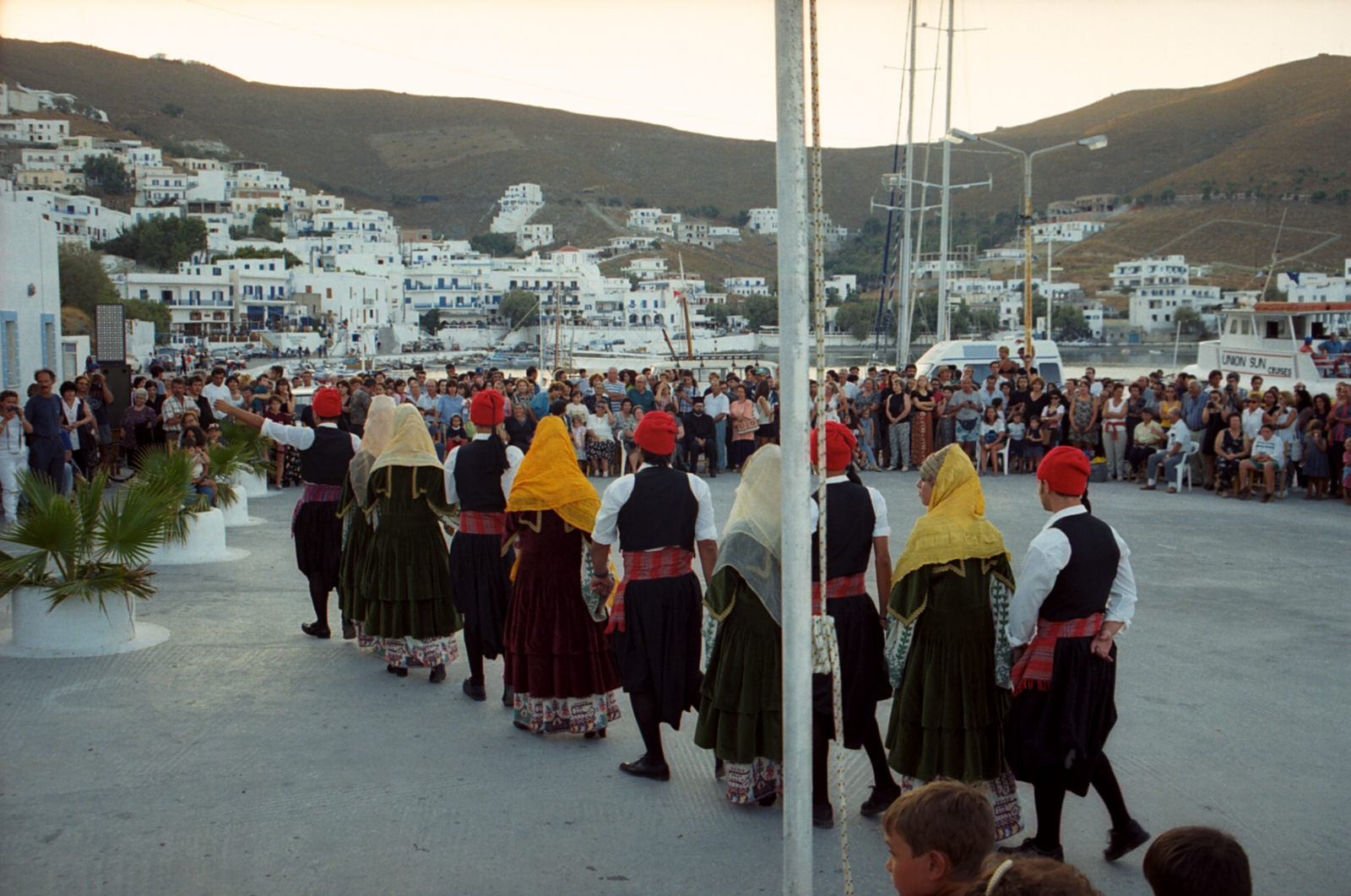
Dancers from Astypalaia

The Aegean Islands have a rich folk dance tradition. For example; syrtos, sousta and ballos.

- Ballos
- Ikariotikos
- Kamara
- Kalymnikos
- Karavas of Naxos
- Lerikos of Leros
- Mihanikos
- Parianos
- Pentozalis
- Pirgousikos of Chios
- Pidikhtos
- Rhoditikos
- Sousta (Sousta Lerou, Sousta Tilou)
- Syrtos (Syrtos Kythnou, Syrtos Serifou, Syrtos Naxou)
- Trata

== See also ==
- Greek folk music
- Greek dances
- Cretan music
- Greek musical instruments
