= Kalamatianó =

Greek folk music genre

Kalamatianó (Greek: καλαματιανό) is a type of Greek folk music associated with a dance sharing its name. Originating in the southern Greek port city of Kalamata, its most recognizable feature is its asymmetrical time signature of 7/8 time, meaning that there are seven beats per measure, generally subdivided into two groups of 3 and 4 beats respectively.

Although this rhythmic structure is unfamiliar to westerners, it is thoroughly at home in Greece, Cyprus and the surrounding countries. The kalamatiano is a traditional line dance admitting of varying speeds. Probably the best known folk song in this genre is Mandili Kalamatiano (Μαντήλι Καλαματιανό).

An especially haunting example of the kalamatiano, M'ekapses geitonissa (Μ'έκαψες γειτόνισσα), was recorded for the National Geographic Society's groundbreaking Music of Greece album, released in 1968.

== See also ==
- Greek music
- Kalamatianos (dance)
- Greek dances
- Greek folk music
- Nisiotika
- Sousta
- Ikariotikos
