= Lerikos =

Lerikos (Greek: Λέρικος) is a traditional Greek circle dance. Participants hold hands at the shoulder level and dance in a counterclockwise direction.

== See also ==
- Greek music
- Greek dances
- Sousta
- Greek folk music
- Pentozali
- Syrtos
- List of folk dances sorted by origin
