= Greek traditional music =

Music genre

Greek traditional music (Greek: παραδοσιακή μουσική, paradosiaki mousiki, 'traditional music'; also δημοτικά τραγούδια, dimotika tragoudia, 'folk songs') includes a variety of Greek styles played by ethnic Greeks in Greece, Cyprus, Australia, the United States and other parts of Europe. Apart from the common music found generally in Greece, each region of Greece contains a distinct type of folk music that originated from the region due to their history, traditions and cultural influences.

== Overview ==
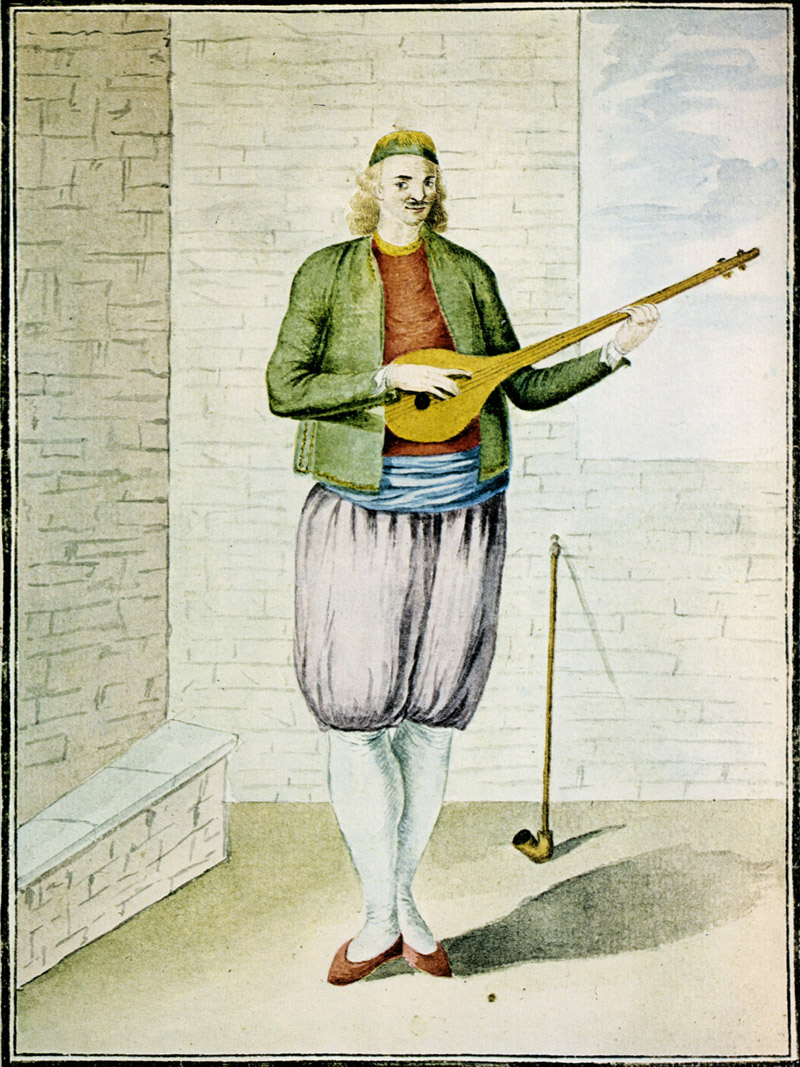
A Greek of the 18th century playing tambouras.

Greek folk music originally, predominantly contained one genre, known as Greek Demotiko (or Demotic/Paradosiako). This refers to the traditional Greek popular songs and music of mainland Greece and islands, which date back to the Byzantine times. It was the sole popular musical genre of the Greek people until the spread of Rebetiko and Laiko (other genres of folk music) in the early 20th century, spread by the Greek refugees from Asia Minor. This style of music evolved from the ancient and the medieval Greek era and is still played today.

The lyrics of Greek folk music are largely based on Demotic (folk) poetry (usually by anonymous lyricists) and consist of popular themes such as love, marriage, humor, death, nature, water, sea, and religion. Some lyrics make reference to the Ottoman Empire, in particular bandit insurgents (known as klephts), Ottoman soldiers (known as armatoloi), as well as various war figures and notable battles.

The songs are played mainly in the following two categories of tempos: 'Syrtos' (various versions) and 'Pidiktos'. Pidikto songs are more energetic and involve leaping, whilst the Syrto songs and accompanying dances are slower and more free-flowing. Some songs also are a combination of Pidikto and Syrto tempos.

Universal dances that accompany Greek folk music include Kalamatianos (a universal Greek dance from Kalamata), Tsamiko, Ballos and Sousta.

== Notable folk songs ==
Some notable folk songs include:

- "Itia"
- "Milo mou kokkino"
- "Kontoula lemonia"
- "Mou parigile to aidoni"
- "Enas aetos"
- "Kira Vangelio"
- "Gerakina"
- "Saranta palikaria"

and Nisiotika (the songs from the islands)

- "Ikariotikos"
- "Samiotisa"
- "Thalassaki"
- "Armenaki"
- "Amorgos Sousta"
- "Ela Na Pame S'ena Meros
- "Dari Dari
- "Dirlada"
- "Lygaria"
- "Psaropoula", such as "Tilirkiotissa" and "Psintri Vasilitsia mou" (Cyprus).

== Crete ==
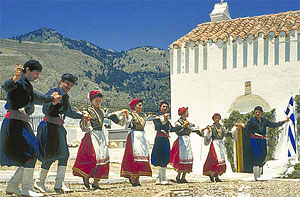
Cretan dancers.

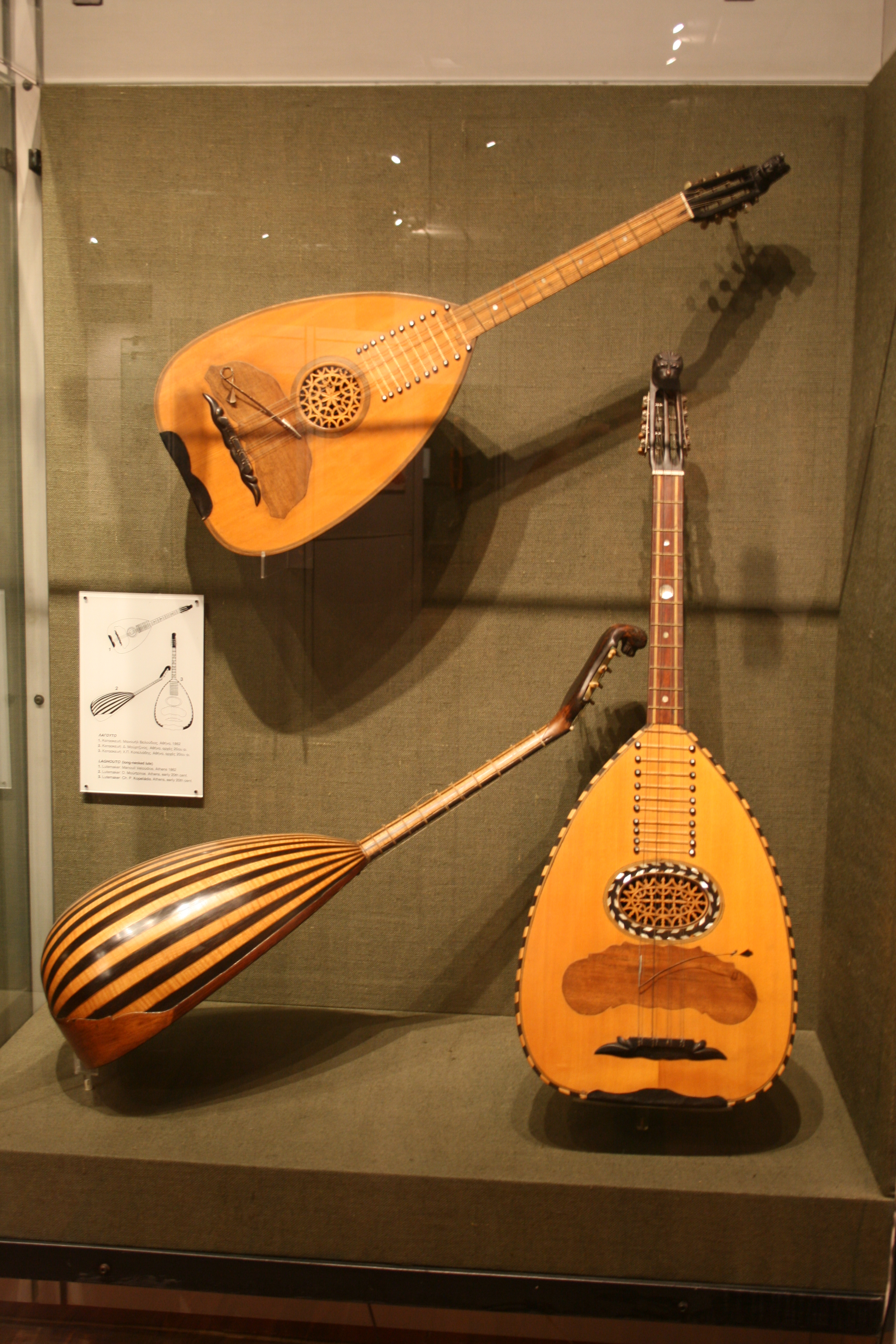
Different types of laouto.

The Greek islands of Kárpathos, Khálki, Kássos and Crete form an arc where the Cretan Lyra is the dominant instrument. Kostas Mountakis, is an example of a person of Greek origin who played the Lyra and helped popularise it in Greece. The Lyra is often accompanied by the Lute (laouto) which resembles a mandolin. Askomandoura (a type of bagpipe) is also used in Cretan folk music. Crete has a unique history of folk dance tradition, which includes swift dances like Pentozalis, Sousta, Syrtos, Trizali, Katsabadianos, Chaniotikos, Siganos, Pidichtos Lasithou, Maleviziotikos, Tsiniaris, Ierapetrikos and Laziotikos.

== Aegean islands ==
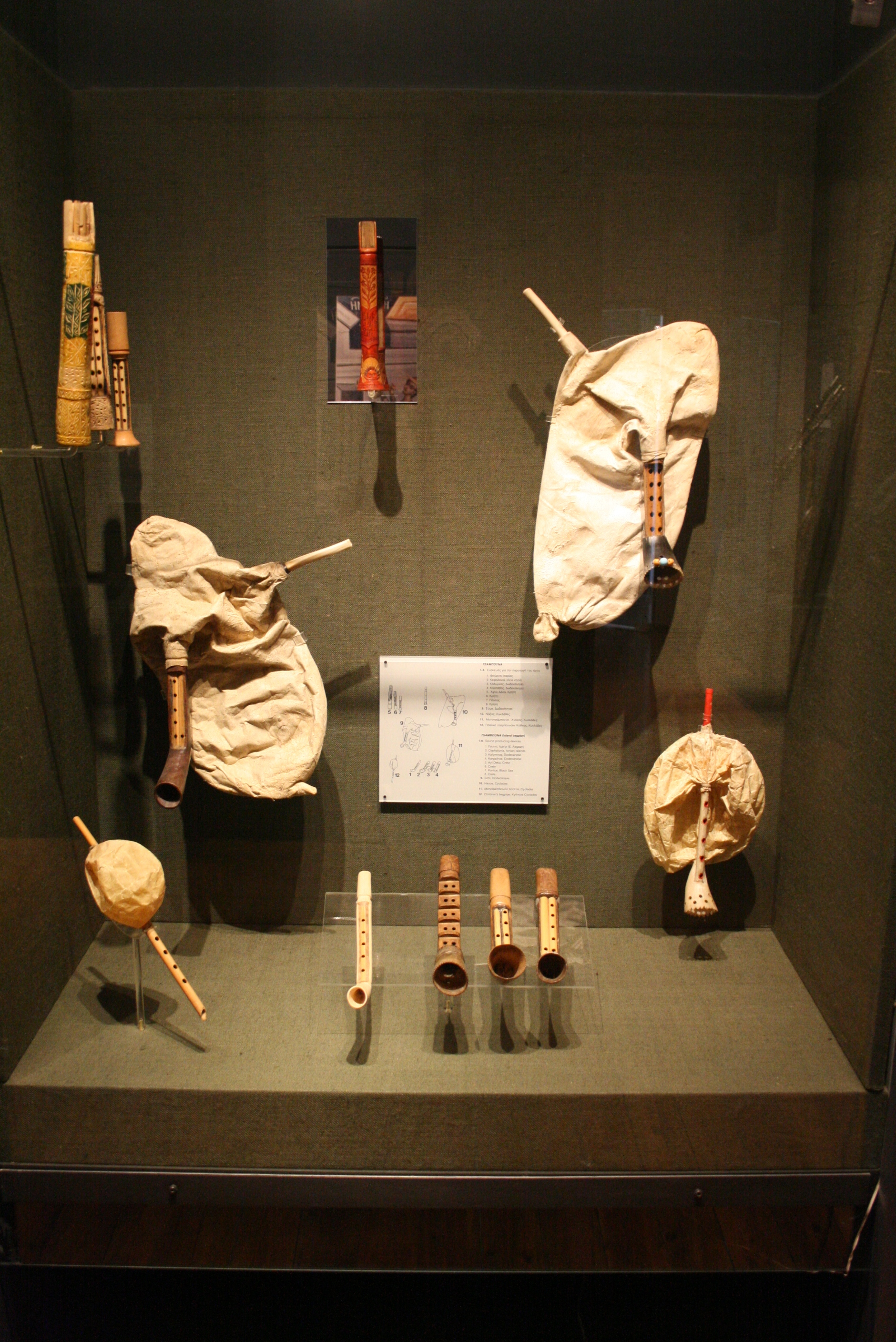
Various tsampounas from the Cyclades and Dodecanese islands

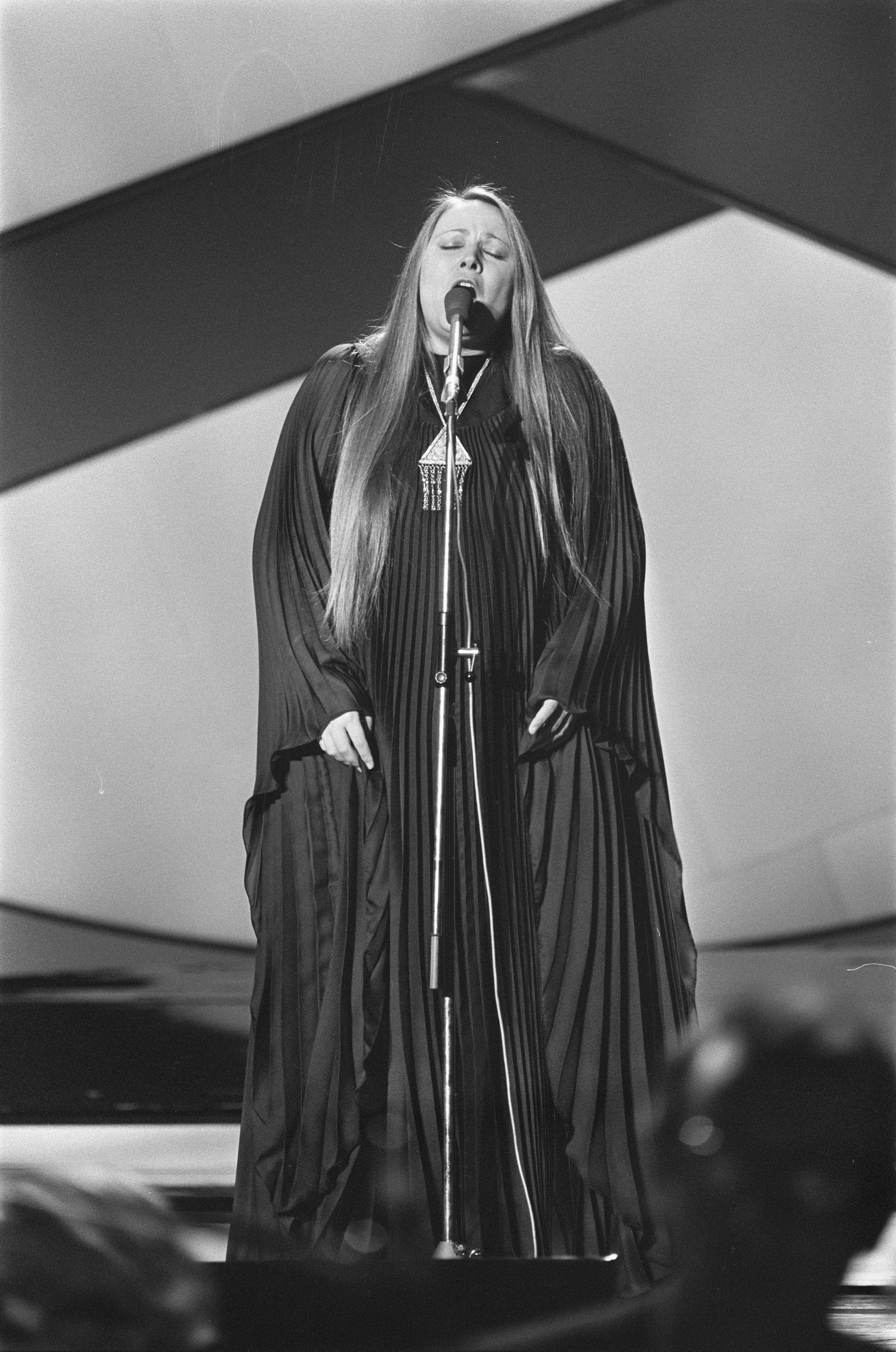
Mariza Koch

The Aegean islands of Greece are known for their Nisiótika (meaning from the islands) songs. The characteristics of these Greek island folk songs vary widely. Although the basis of the sound is characteristically secular-Byzantine. The relative isolation of the islands allowed the separate development of island-specific Greek music. Nisiótika songs are often accompanied by the lyra, guitar, tsampouna, souravli and violin.

Notable singers include Yiannis Parios, the Konitopoulos family and Mariza Koch who was an active Greek folk singer in the 1970s and performed the song 'Panayia Mou' in the Eurovision Song Contest 1976. Folk dances include the Ballos, Syrtos, Sousta, Chiotikos, Kalymniotikos, Stavrotos, Lerikos, Kamara, Michanikos, Trata, Panagia and Ikariotikos.

In the Aegean Cyclades, the violin is used more often than the Cretan lyra as well as the clarinet, mandolin, bagpipe, dulcimer and guitar. Some Nisiotika musicians include Nikos Oikonomidis, Leonidas Klados and Stathis Koukoularis. Folk dances in the Cyclades include Lerikos, Syrtos (Serifou, Naxou and Kythnou), Amorgos dance and Ballos. A prominent singer of Cycladic music was Domna Samiou, who was trained by Greek musicologist, Simon Karas.

The folk music of the Dodecanese (part of the Aegean Islands), also contains prominent elements of Cretan music. Dodecanese folk dances include the Trata, Ballos, Syrtos, Kremasti, Issos, Syrtos Rodou, Michanikos and Kalymnikos, which originates from the island of Kalymnos.

== Central Greece ==
In Central Greece many folk songs make references to the klephts and their role during the Greek war of independence. Folk songs accompany dances in central Greece such as the Antikrystos, Hasapiko, Syrtaki, Kalamatianos, Kamilierikos, Koulouriotikos, Syrtos, Zeibekiko, Tsamiko and Syrto-kalamatianos. The musical tradition of the region is also influenced by Polyphonic songs, through the Arvanites.

== Epirus ==
In Epirus, folk songs are pentatonic and polyphonic, sung by both male and female singers. These songs often fall into three main categories including firstly, Mirolóyia (the mournful, lamenting songs) that are accompanied by instrumentals, which form the second category and are named Skáros and the third category is named Tis Távlas (songs played when drinking). Prominent instruments used in folk songs in Epirus, include the lute and the clarinet (largely replaced the Lute in the 19th century). Ensembles may also use the violin and defi (a rimmed drum) to accompany dances, mostly slow and heavy, like the Tsamikos, Koftos, Fisouni, Sta Dio (4/4 tempo), Sta Tria (3/4 tempo), Zagorisios, Metsovitikos and Beratis.

== Peloponnese ==
Folk dances that accompany Peloponnese folk music include the Kalamatianos (tempo is in 3/4 meter), Tsamikos, Monodiplos, Tsakonikos, Syrtos, Ai Georgis and Maniatikos. In the songs there are also references to the klephts. In Mani there also exists a traditional category of songs named the "μοιρολόγια" Mirolóyia (laments), typically sung by the old women of Mani.

== Ionian Islands ==
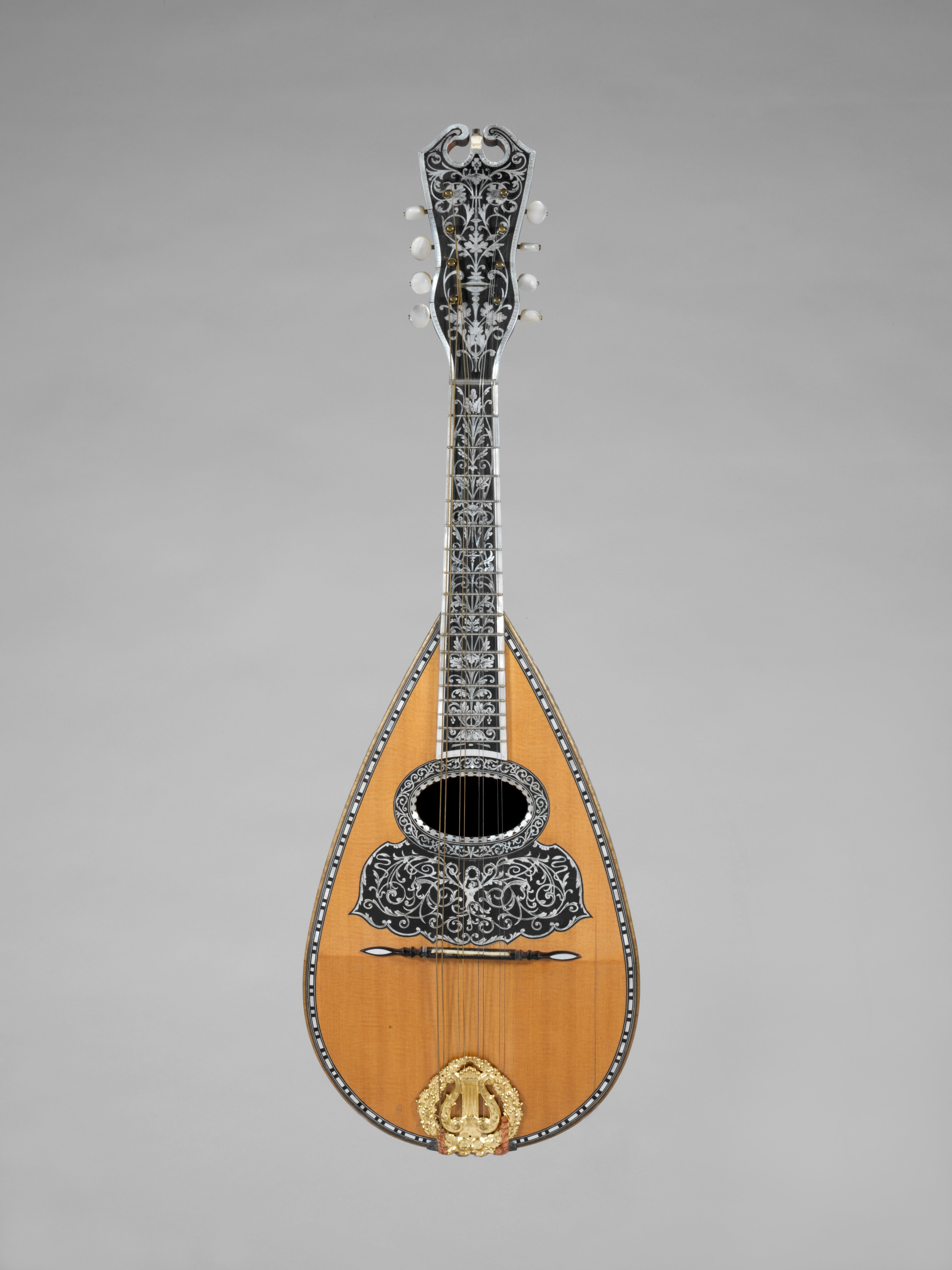
Mandolin, dominant instrument of the Heptanesian music.

The Ionian Islands were never completely under Ottoman control (only Kefalonia was under Ottoman control during 1479–1481 and 1485–1500) and were largely occupied by the Venetians. This is reflected in the folk music. For example Kantadhes (καντάδες), which are a form of romantic serenade, stylistically reflect the Venetian presence and Macedonian Romani (Gypsy) presence in the Ionian Islands. Greek Kantadhes are typically performed by three male singers accompanied by the mandolin or guitar. These romantic songs developed mainly in Kefalonia in the early 19th century but spread throughout Greece after its liberation in 1821.

An Athenian form of Kantadhes arose later, accompanied by the violin, clarinet and laouto. However the style is accepted as uniquely Ionian or Heptanese. The island of Zakynthos has a diverse musical history with influences also from Crete and many of these traditional, Heptanese songs would be played in theatre productions. Folk dances include the Tsirigotikos (from Kythira), Levantinikos (from Zakynthos), Ballos, Syrtos, Ai Georgis, Kerkiraikos (from Corfu).

Notable songs are "Kato Sto Yialo", "S'ena paporo mesa", "Apopse tin kithara mou".

The Church music (Byzantine) of the islands is also different from the rest of Greece, containing many Western European and Catholic influences, which played a large role on the Orthodox rite. In this region the first School of modern Greek classical music (Heptanesean or Ionian School, Επτανησιακή Σχολή) was also founded and established in 1815.

== Macedonia ==
Folk dances in Macedonia include the Hasapiko, Syrtaki, Leventikos, Zonaradiko, Endeka Kozanis, Stankena, Baidouska, Makedonikos Antikristos, and Kapitan Louka. There are also folk songs which make references to the Macedonian Struggle, describing the difficulties faced by Macedonian people during the Balkan wars and allude to those who became refugees and sought asylum in Greece. Often, Macedonian folk music uses the dauli (a medium-sized bass drum) and a zurna (a wider oboe) as well as hand drums (tympana), trumpets and bells (koudounia or "chálkina" in the local vernacular). Other instruments used include violin, clarinet and Macedonian lyra.

== Thessaly ==
Folk songs from Thessaly are mostly slow and stately, however the music accompanying the Syrtos dance, is typically livelier and more energetic than it is in other parts of Greece. Songs accompany dances such as the Kalamatianos (popular universally in Greece), Thessalikos, Galanogalani, Kangeli, Gaitanaki, Tsamikos, Sta Tria, Karagouna and Beratis.

== Thrace ==
Instruments used in Ancient Thracian music include goatskin bagpipes (Gaida) and the Byzantine lyra. Folk dances include the Tapeinos Horos, Baidouska, Tromakton, Souflioutouda, Zonaradiko, Sousta, Tsestos, and Apadiasteite Sto Choro. Traditional Thracian dances are usually swift in tempo and are mostly circle dances in which the men dance at the front of the line. The Gaida, a goatskin bagpipe, is commonly used in Thracian music and clarinets are also used. The Thracian Gaida, also called Avlos, is different from the Macedonian or other Bulgarian bagpipes. It is more high in pitch than the Macedonian Gaida but less so than the Bulgarian gaida (or Dura). The Thracian Gaida is also still widely used throughout Thrace in northeastern Greece. Notable singers of Thracian music include Chronis Aidonidis and Kyriakos Sfetsas.

== Pontus ==
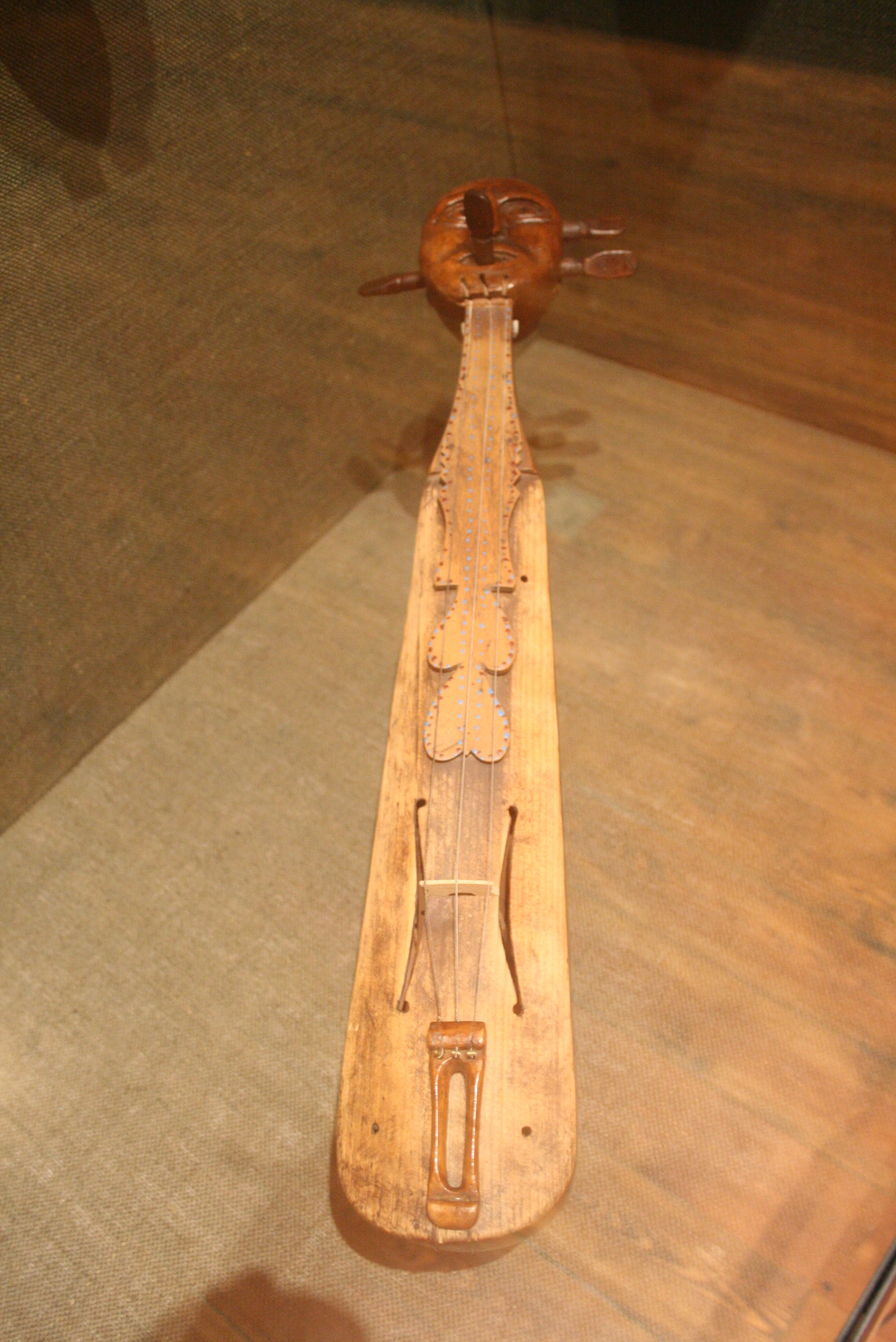
A Pontic lyra

Pontic music retains elements of the musical traditions of Byzantine music and the music from the region known as Caucasus.

The primary instruments in Pontic music are a bowed instrument known as Kemençe of Laz or the Pontic Lyra, which originated in the Byzantine Empire period and is similar to the Byzantine lyra and Cretan lyra. Other bowed musical instrument are also used, such as the Kit violin and Rebec, these are more popular in the Western region of Pontus. Other instruments include the drums, lute, Askomandoura (a type of bagpipe), Daouli (a type of drum) and Aulos (a wind instrument). Folk dances from Pontus include slower dances including the Omál, Tik and Dipát. Faster dances include the Tik Tónyia and Kotsari and other dances include Giouvarlantoum, Serra and Tas.

== Constantinople ==
The main Greek dance, for which folk songs are used as an accompaniment in Constantinople is the hasapikos. It originated in the Middle Ages as a military exercise with swords, adopted by the Byzantine military. During Byzantine times, the hasapiko was called μακελλάρικος χορός (makellarikos horos). The songs were later danced by butchers in a social setting, and it was danced in both Turkey and Greece.

The use of Politiki lyra and Politiko laouto is common to the folk songs from Constantinople. The average Constantinople style ensemble has a vocalist, oud, qanun and percussion, usually in the form of a darbuka drum. The Hasapiko also later served as one of the bases for the sirtaki and it is danced in mostly all areas of Greece, with the use of bouzouki.

== Cyprus ==
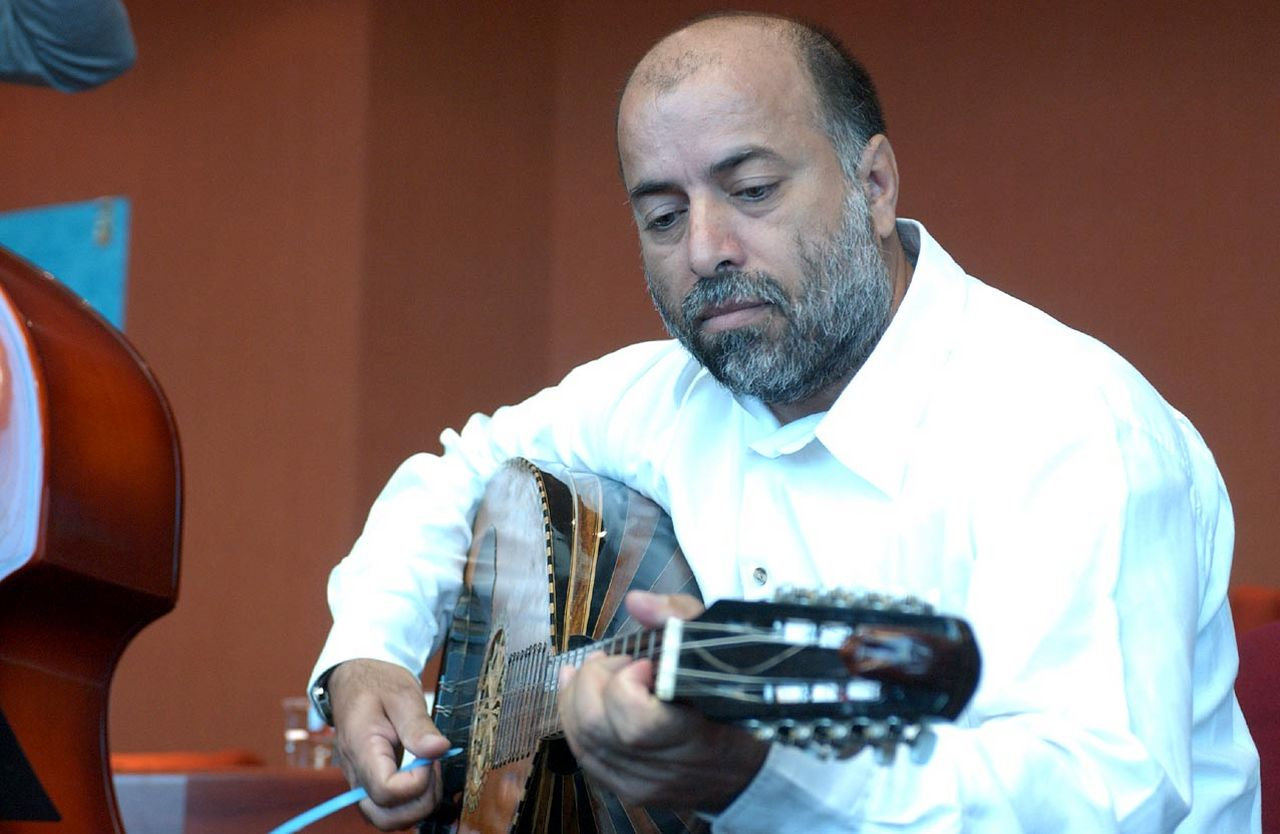
Evagoras Karageorgis from Cyprus playing laouto.

Cyprus is an independent country, currently contested between the Republic of Cyprus and the self-declared Turkish Republic of Northern Cyprus. Cyprus includes a variety of classical, folk and popular genres. Cypriot folk music is similar to the folk music of Greece and includes dances such as the Sirtaki, Syrtos, the Cypriot Zeibekiko and Antikristos. Cypriot folk music typically uses the Lute (Laouto) and since World War Two, the violin has been also used.

== See also ==
- Greek dances
- Dora Stratou
- Swallow song of Rhodes; Greek folk song composed by Athenaeus
