= Trata (dance) =

Traditional commemorative dance

Women of Megara, dancing the traditional Trata

The Trata (Greek: Τράτα) is a traditional commemorative dance performed every two years in Megara in Attica, but also in the Aegean Islands.

The Trata in the Aegean Islands refers to a Syrtos dance done to the song Η τράτα μας η κουρελού. The dance is done at all social functions and gatherings. On the Island of Ikaria (North East Aegean) they dance it with specific movements in the chorus.

On the Tuesday following Easter in every alternate year, the women of Megara take part the traditional dance known as the Trata on the open space before the tiny church known as Saint John the Dancer. It is popularly believed to commemorate the building of this chapel during a single day during the years of Ottoman Greece.

The trata symbolizes the fishing. The famous dance, the Trata, is said to celebrate their success of fishing, each day.

However, folklorists note that the movements of this dance, which mimic the hauling in of fishing nets, seem to indicate that it is probably a very ancient dance, much older than the Ottoman period, and was originally performed to ensure success of the fishermen.

== See also ==
- Greek music
- Greek dances
- Greek folk music
- Nisiotika
- Sousta
- Ikariotikos

== Literature ==
- Tomkinson, John (2003). Festive Greece: A Calendar of Tradition. Athens: Anagnosis. ISBN 960-87186-7-8. Archived from the original on 2006-06-23.
- Megas, George A. (1982). Greek Calendar Customs. Athens.
