= Rembetika Hipsters =

- Origin: Calgary, Alberta
- Genres: Rebetiko
- Years active: 1996–present
- Members: Nikos Diochnos, Allen Baekeland, Giorgos Iosifelis, Lincoln Frey, Jonathan Lewis
- Past members: Brigitte Dajczer, Danny Patton, Ben Johnson, Jon Nordstrom, Edmond Agopian
- Website: Rembetika Hipsters

The Rembetika Hipsters are a Canadian band based in Calgary, Alberta. They perform primarily Greek rebetiko music, as well as composing original music and exploring styles from Epirus, known as Epirotika, Smyrnaiko music from the region now known as İzmir, and Nisiotika music of the Greek islands.

== History ==
The band began in 1996 with Nikos Diochnos (bouzouki, vocals) and Allen Baekeland (guitar and vocals). Giorgos Iosifelis plays bass guitar, Lincoln Frey adds clarinet and melodeon, Jonathan Lewis adds violin and baglamas and Malcolm Lim plays hand percussion instruments such as darbuke. Brigitte Dajczer also played and recorded the violin from October 1999 to 2007. Other past members have included Danny Patton (bass), Ben Johnson (percussion), Jon Nordstrom (bass), and Edmond Agopian (violin).

By 1998, the band was performing locally in Calgary. In 2002, they began performing weekly at Calgary's Pegasus restaurant, and continued there for many years.

The group later performed at music festivals, concert halls, and small venues across Canada. They have traveled to Greece twice to play, reunite with family, and learn about the culture. They performed at the 2001 and 2007 Calgary Folk Music Festival.

In 2011, the band released their third album, Kafeneion.

As of 2017, the Hipsters continue to perform in small venues around Alberta.

== Discography ==
=== Studio albums ===
Albums by the Rembetika Hipsters
Year	Release title	Label and date
2001	Architects Of Narghilé	Socrates Pizza (SPR001)
2004	Dinner in Polidroso	Socrates Pizza (SPR002)
2011	Kafeneion	(Jan 1, 2011)
