= Mihanikos =

Greek traditional dance

Mihanikos (Greek: Ο χορός του Μηχανικού, literally The dance of the mechanic) is a traditional dance from the Greek island of Kalymnos. It is typically only performed by men dancing in a line. In basic it is a normal Syrtos.

== See also ==
External videos
- Mihanikos kalimnou, Greek traditional dance, Kos island

- Greek folk music
- Greek dances
