= Omal =

Pontic Greek dance

The Omal (also called Duz Horon or Flat Horon) was one of the first Pontic Greek folk dances to be developed from the region of Pontos. In the Pontic language, omal means "regular" or "smooth."

== See also ==
- Greek dances
- Music of Greece
- Kalamatianos
- Syrtos
- Tsamiko
- Horon
