= Peruz =

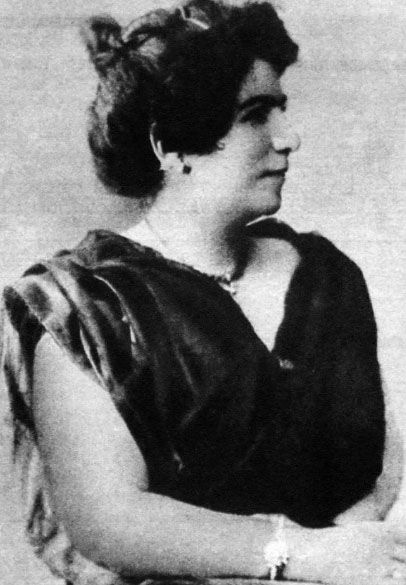
- Peruz

Background information
- Also known as: Peruz
- Born: Petuz Terzakyan; 1866; Sivas, Ottoman Empire
- Died: c. 1920 (Aged 53–54)
- Genre: kanto
- Occupation: Singer-songwriter
- Years active: 1880–1912

Peruz (1866 in Sivas – c. 1920 in Istanbul) also known as Peruz Hanım or Kantocu Peruz, Perviz Hanım was an Ottoman Armenian kanto singer, songwriter. Her family name was Terzakyan. One of her nicknames was Afet-i Devran Peruz.

== Biography ==
Peruz started singing kantos in 1880 when she was 14 years old. She composed her songs and was also the lyricist. Her stage life lasted until 1912. She was beetle-browed, bulk-bodied, attractive and flirtatious woman. Bestekâr Şevki Bey ("Composer Şevki Bey", 1860–1891) fell in love with Peruz and composed many scores such as Hidjaz Severim can ü gönülden seni tersa çiçeğim for her. Her songs were published as "Neşe-i Dil". Peruz was a pioneer with her cousin Şamram (Kelleciyan, 1870–1955), Baydzar, Büyük Emilye [Ameliya] (Pol), Küçük Eleni (Greek), Küçük Virjin [Virgine], Mari Ferha and Agavni all non-Muslim kanto singers.

Peruz was also credited as a lead in 1919 silent short Fahri Bey Makarna Tenceresinde ("Mr. Fahri in Pasta Pot") by Fahri Bey (İsmet Fahri Gülunç). Rushen Hakki and Fahri himself were other actors. Fahri Bey directed another short film of the same year Tombul Aşığın Dört Sevgilisi ("Four Darlings of Plump Lover"). The film was not completed de to a legal dispute and there were no credit records for Peruz. Peruz died at 54 years old.
