= Amalia Bakas =

American singer

- Also known as: Amalia Hanim
- Born: Mazaltov [Mally] Matsa; 1897; Ioannina, Janina Vilayet, Ottoman Empire (present-day Greece)
- Died: 1979 (aged 81–82) New Port Richey, Florida, U.S.
- Genres: Greek Music; Turkish Music; Rebetiko; Kanto (music)
- Occupations: Singer; songwriter
- Instrument: Vocals
- Years active: 1920s–Early 1960s
- Labels: M.G. Parsekian Record Company; Ajdin Aselois

Amalia Bakas (born Mazaltov [Mally] Matsa 1897–1979) was a Greek singer and performer in the United States during the 20th century. She was heavily involved in the "Eighth Avenue scene" in New York City and in Greek communities around the United States.

Her repertoire consisted of mostly traditional songs to which she added her own style and words. Unlike other singers of the time, her songs were mostly about love. She also wrote two songs, "Elenitsa Mou" after she was baptized and "Diamontoula Mou" for her daughter.

Little is known about Bakas before her time in the United States. She was born in Ioannina in the Janina Vilayet of the Ottoman Empire in a Romaniote Jewish community. The Romaniote community was male-dominated and births of females were not even recorded which may account for lack of information of Amalia’s early life.

In 1912, when Bakas was 15 years old, she traveled to America on the Kaiser Franz Josef I ocean liner. She was detained at Ellis Island, lacking the necessary $50 fee until a phone call to a relative was made, who paid the fee for her. In 1913, she married Jack Saretta, also from Ioannina and they lived on Rivington Street on the Lower East Side in New York, NY. She worked in a factory as a seamstress and the couple had two daughters, Diamond and Ester Cleonike.

In the 1920s, Bakas began to perform in the café-amans and Turkish nightclubs in the early 1920s taking the stage name Amalia. Her first recordings were made with the M.G. Parsekian Record Company in Hoboken, New Jersey and consisted of 8 Turkish songs. Later in Chicago she recorded 6 Greek and Turkish songs with the Greek Record Company. Bakas also recorded with Marika Papagika, another popular Greek singer of the time. Bakas was one of Papagika’s only known friends and Papagika would babysit her daughter Diamond.

Her daughter Diamond would often perform with her mother by either singing duets or by accompanying her on the doumbek. As the life of a performer was not one a woman of the Romaniote community should be leading, Bakas' husband divorced her and sent her other daughter Ester to live in Greece. In 1926 she converted to the Greek Orthodox Church to marry Gus Bakas. Amalia and Gus worked in the restaurant business with Bakas still performing at the café-amans on 8th Avenue in New York City.

During the 1930s, Bakas did not record, but traveled the United States to perform with George Katsaros. They performed in New York City, the Catskill Mountain region, Finger Lakes region, Detroit, Chicago, Gary, Indiana and Philadelphia where large Greek communities resided.

In this period of the Second World War, Bakas and her daughter Diamond were living in Chicago, working at a restaurant called Pantheon where she also performed. In the early part of the decade, Bakas recorded for Ajdin Aselois labels in which she had part ownership. She performed with a variety of artists including Gus Gadines, John Pappas, John Dalas, Garbis Bakirgian, Theodore Kappas, Alexis Zervas, and Nicke Doneff.

During this period, the 1940s, there was a revival of Greek songs from the 1910s and 1920s and Amalia’s recordings reflected this shift. This revival can be directly attributed to the mass exodus of Greek refugees fleeing from Turkey to Greece - escaping the 20th century's first mass genocide.

Over one-third of Amalia's music during this period were old songs from her own or from the pioneer Greek vocalist Coula Antonopoulos's early recorded music - which were laments, music expressing personal anguish and resilience in times of hardship, adversity, and atrocities. These provided some solace to expatriates eager to begin a new life in America.

In the early 1960s, Amalia retired from the performing life. She moved to New Port Richey, Florida to be close to her daughter in 1974. She died in 1979 and her obituary did not even mention her career as a singer.

== Discography ==
During her career, Bakas made many recordings:

- Kyria Amalia (Yaniotisa)
  - "Hetzaz Manes"
  - "Antam Aman"
  - "I Agia Sophia-Zeibekiko"
  - "O Giatros (Ah! Giatre Mou)" (The Doctor)
  - "Gamjendeyem-Sarki" [in Turkish]
- M.B. Amillia Hanum
  - "Kala Kalaya Bakar" [in Turkish]
  - "Turnam Nerdan Galior" [in Turkish]
  - "Gulfishan-Neva Canto" [in Turkish]
  - "Yolda Bouldoum Bir Elna" [in Turkish]
  - "Chifte Telly Ghazel" [in Turkish]
- Amalia Bakas
  - "Ali Pasha-Yaniotiko"
  - "Trigona-Yaniotiko"
  - "Paramana Cuna Cuna" (Rock the Cradle)-Zeibekiko
  - "E Thalassa" (The Sea) {Yanio Tiko}
- NY April 11, 1927
  - "Nea Vaslio" {Young Basilio}-Kalamatiano
  - "T’Asteri To Lambro" {Bright Star}-Kleftiko
  - "Berbantis" {The Bomb}-Zeibekiko
  - "Sabah Taxim"
- NY August 10, 1927
  - "Mesa Sto Perivoli Sou" {In Your Garden}
  - "Esi Kimas Me Ti Mama Sou" {You Sleep With Your Mother}-Sirtos
  - "Mavromata" {Black Eyes}
  - "Den Mou Lete Ti Na Kamo" {Tell Me What I Must Do}-Sirtos
  - "Apo Ta Mikra Mou Hortaniase" {My Grace Overgrown With Grass}
- NY October 26, 1927
  - "Elenitsa Mou" (Bakas)
  - "Ta Mtia Sou Ine Galana"
  - "Haido Sirtos"
  - "Karakatsana"
  - "Pes Mou Ti Tha Katalavis" - Zeibekiko
  - "Gianoula"
- NY February 8, 1928
  - "Eliosan Ta Kokola Mou"
  - "Horis Elpida Na Zo" - Rembetiko
  - "Thelo Na S’ Alismoniso" - Karsilamas
  - "Mavromatou Me Pligoses"
  - "O Pselos"
  - "I Vlaha I Emorfi"
- NY February 13, 1929
  - "Agrilamas Ke Psarades"
  - "Mavromalou"
- NY 1929
