= Shamiram Kelleciyan =

- Also known as: Shamiram
- Born: Shamiram Kelleciyan; 1870; Constantinople, Ottoman Empire
- Died: March 14, 1955 (aged 84–85) Istanbul, Turkey
- Genres: kanto
- Occupation: Singer-songwriter

Shamiram Kelleciyan (also known as Shamiram Hanım, Shamiram Hanım; 1870 – March 14, 1955) was an Ottoman Armenian kanto singer-songwriter.
