= Giorgos Provias =

Greek dancer, actor, and choreographer

Giorgos Provias (Greek: Γιώργος Προβιάς) is a Greek dancer, actor, and choreographer; the creator of the staple Greek "folk" dance Sirtaki.

== Work ==
=== Credited ===
- "Arhipseftaros", 1971, credited as dance coach
- "Εσένα μόνο αγαπώ" (I Only Love You), 1970, dance choreography
- Synnefiasmenoi orizontes, 1968, himself
- "Etairia thavmaton", 1962, dancer

=== Uncredited ===
- Sirtaki ("Zorba's dance") in Zorba the Greek
- Never on Sunday
