= Lykourgos Angelopoulos =

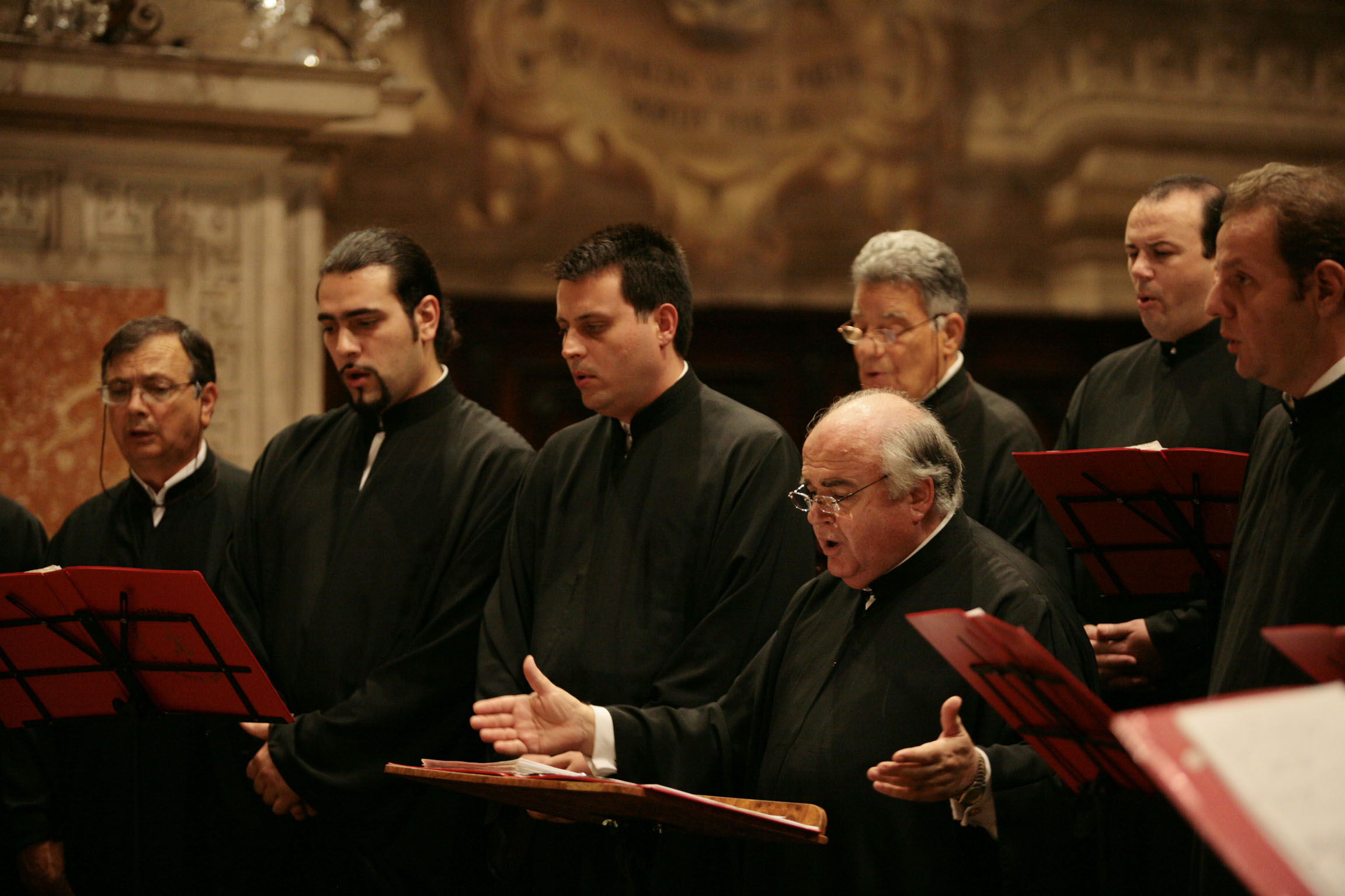
Angelopoulos performing in 2008

Lykourgos Angelopoulos (Greek: Λυκούργος Αγγελόπουλος; 21 September 1941 – 18 May 2014) was a Greek chanter. He was professor at the School of Byzantine Chant at the Conservatory of Athens, the founder and director of the Greek Byzantine Choir and an Archon Protopsaltes (lead protopsaltes) of the Patriarchate of Constantinople.

== Life ==
Lykourgos A. Angelopoulos was born in Pyrgos, Peloponnese, on September 21, 1941. He studied Byzantine music at the School of National Music, under the tutelage of the great musician and musicologist, Simon Karas, and Law at the University of Athens. He took a diploma in the Macedonian Odeion of Thessaloniki. He was the protopsaltes (first cantor) at the Church of Saint Irene in Athens (first in the Metropolis of Athens). He was the founder and director of the Greek Byzantine Choir and professor of Byzantine Music at the Nikos Skalkotas Conservatory and at the Philippos Nakas Conservatory in Athens. He was the director of the Children's Byzantine Choir of the Archbishopric of Athens since its foundation and the director of the School of Byzantine Music for the Metropolis of Elis and Olena and the Metropolis of Rethymno and Avlopotamou.

== Works ==
Lykourgos Angelopoulos had published his own editions according to the re-introduction of signs taken from Late Byzantine notation. Simon Karas translated them within the rhythmic context of Neo-Byzantine notation as ornaments. (Note: A manual published by Georgios Konstantinou was supposed to explain the signs, used in Angelopoulos' editions, to his students.) Concerning performance practice, the choir follows Karas' innovations and his interpretation of the Byzantine modes, due to Lykourgos Angelopoulos' use of the "extended" neumatic notation in his own hand-written chant editions. (Note: In a video of Petros Peloponnesios' short version (Doxastarion syntomon) of the Doxastikon oktaechon Θεαρχίῳ νεύματι, we can follow his choir with Angelopoulos' edition using Karas' extended neume notation.) In a contribution to a musicological conference at Delphi (1986), Lykourgos Angelopoulos explained his attitude to the living tradition and to the New Method in general, and editions based on Simon Karas' Method in particular. (Note: See Angelopoulos' contribution to the Delphi conference (1986).)He died at the age of 73 on 18 May 2014.

== International collaboration ==
He had collaborated with the Athens Radio Broadcast on programs related to Byzantine Music and had performed contemporary music composed by M. Adamis, D. Terzakis and K. Sfetsas. He was a member of the research team headed by Marcel Pérès in France, which studies the old Western chants and their relationship to the Byzantine ones. He had performed Byzantine, Old Roman, Ambrosian and other traditions of Western plainchant in recordings with the Ensemble Organum in France.

== Honours ==
In 1994 Lykourgos Angelopoulos was honored by the Ecumenical Patriarch Bartholomew I with the Patriarchal offikion and was named Archon Protopsaltis (First Chanter) of the Holy Archdiocese of Constantinople. He had also been honored by Diodoros, Patriarch of Jerusalem, by the Orthodox Church of Finland and by the Diocese of Patras in Greece.

== Influence on the living tradition ==
Lykourgos had especially influenced Georgios Konstantinou, who proposed a notation for microtonal shifts (melodic attraction) and notated details, which had previously been part of oral tradition. (Note: See the examples in his manual (1997).) The advantage of the oral tradition is that only those singers who had been introduced by their masters, followed a certain local tradition. The Balkans and the Orient are still rich of these local traditions. Lykourgos Angelopoulos was well known for his international collaborations, e.g. with Divna Ljubojević, and as a charismatic singer who had a large following. He had faced strong opposition among psaltes who belong to these local traditions. (Note: For example, issues were raised regarding Karas's extended notation and George Michalakis wrote extended polemics against it as well. see also his excerpts of Angelopoulos' paper in 2002.nd Georgios Michalakis' polemics, who had a point of view influenced by Iakovos Nafpliotis and the Old Patriarchal School, might serve as two examples of the controversy surrounding Simon Karas' Method.)

=== Works ===
==== Essays ====
- Angelopoulos, Lykourgos (1986). Terzopoulos, Konstantinos (ed.). The Importance of Simon Karas' Research and Teaching Regarding the Taxonomy and Transcription of the Effect of the Signs of Cheironomy: Oral Interpretation of the Written Interpretation. Translation of Angelopoulos' contribution at the Delphi Musicological Conference, 4–7 September 1986. Psaltiki Journal.
- "Η τεχνική του ισοκρατήματος στη νεώτερη μουσική πραξή". Athens: Lykourgos Angelopoulos. 12 November 2000.

==== Interpretations ====
- Koukouzeles, John. "Polyeleos-Psalm (kalophonic setting of Ps. 2:2) Τότε λαλήσει προς αυτούς εν οργή Αυτού [Then He shall speak to them in His anger], echos plagios tetartos". YouTube.
- Chourmouzios Chartophylakos. "Kratema, echos tritos". YouTube.

=== Fieldwork ===
- Lycourgos Angelopoulos, ed. (July 1982). "Hierodeacon father Dionysios Firfiris". musicale. Karyes, Mount Athos.

=== Portraits ===
- "Byzantine Hymns sung by the Greek-Byzantine Choir under direction of Lykourgos Angelopoulos". Ieropsaltis.
- "Homage for Lycourgos Angelopoulos". musicale.
- "Ελληνική Βυζαντινή Χορωδία (ΕΛΒΥΧ) / The Greek Byzantine Choir". Analogion. Archived from the original on 16 June 2007.
- Mille, Olivier; Colosimo, Jean-François (1999). "Extract from the French Documentary "Le Silence des anges - Terres et voix de l'Orient orthodoxe"". YouTube. France, Belgique.
- Evanthia Nika-Sampson; Maria Alexandru; Adrian Sîrbu, eds. (23 April 2013). "Conference Η συμβολή του Λυκούργου Αγγελόπουλου, Άρχοντος Πρωτοψάλτου της Αγιωτάτης Αρχιεπισκοπής Κωνσταντινουπόλεως, στις Βυζαντινές Μουσικές Σπουδές και στη Μουσικολογία γενικότερα [The contribution of Lycourgos Angelopoulos, Archon Precentor of the Most Holy Archdiocese of Constantinople, to the Byzantine Music Studies and to Musicology in general]" (video streaming). Thessaloniki: Aristotle University. Programme.

=== Workshop ===
- Angelopoulos, Lykourgos (2008). "Organizing a Byzantine Choir (90 min)". Second Symposium on Byzantine Music Education (2008). Alexander Lingas (translator). Axion Estin Foundation.

=== Controversies about the Karas School ===
- "Η σημειογραφία του Σίμωνος Καρά Κριτική θεώρηση / The Notation of Simon Karas: An Evaluation". Archived from the original on 17 June 2012.
