= Lepreo =

Lepreo Λέπρεο
- Community
- Location within Greece
- Coordinates: 37°26′N 21°43′E
- Country: Greece
- Administrative region: West Greece
- Regional unit: Elis
- Municipality: Zacharo
- Municipal unit: Zacharo

Population (2021)
  - Community: 362
- Time zone: UTC+2 (EET)
  - Summer (DST): UTC+3 (EEST)

Lepreo (Greek: Λέπρεο, before 1916: Στροβίτζι - Strovitzi) is a village and a community in the municipality of Zacharo, Elis, Greece. The community includes the small villages Agrapidia, Drakos, Panagies, Revelaiika and Skoupas. It is situated on a hillside, 2 km southwest of Taxiarches, 5 km west of Nea Figaleia and 8 km southeast of Zacharo. Lepreo was named after the ancient city Lepreum. The ruins of Lepreum, 500 m north of the present village, have been excavated in 1982.

== Population ==
Year	Population	Community population
1981	-	615
1991	-	499
2001	329	532
2011	219	366
2021	221	362

== People ==
- Simon Karas (1903–1999), a Greek musicologist

== See also ==
- List of settlements in Elis
