= Giorgos Konitopoulos =

Greek singer (1933–1991)

Giorgos Konitopoulos Γιώργος Κονιτόπουλος
- Born: 4 June 1933; Athens, Greece
- Died: 18 June 1991 (aged 58)
- Genres: Nisiotika, folk
- Occupations: Composer, violinist
- Instrument: Violin

Giorgos Konitopoulos (Greek: Γιώργος Κονιτόπουλος; born 4 June 1933) was a Greek violinist and composer from the island of Naxos.

== Biography ==
Konitopoulos was born in Athens on June 4, 1933. His parents were Michalis Konitopoulos from Kinidaros, Naxos and also a famous violinist, and Maria Firogeni from Keramoti, Naxos. As World War II set in he and his family relocated to Naxos in 1940.

His older sister Irini Konitopoulou-Legaki was also an accomplished musician an exponent of the Nisiotika musical tradition of the Greek islands.

In 1963 he married Katerina Kounadis.

He died of a heart attack on June 18, 1991 leaving a legacy of approximately 500 songs, about 70 traditional, with the remainder his own compositions.
