= Simon Karas =

Simon Karas (Lepreo ,21 May 1903 – Athens, 26 January 1999) was a Greek musicologist, who specialized in Byzantine music tradition.

Simon Karas was born in Lepreo, Zacharo municipality, Elis. He studied paleography of Byzantine musical notation, was active in collecting and preserving ancient musical manuscripts, collected performances of Greek folk songs and of Byzantine chant from different regions, in most cases writing them down in Byzantine notation, further altered and modified by him, to better match his needs. He also wrote his own music, and performed himself as a chanter or singer.

The figure of Simon Karas is highly controversial, and it strongly divides Byzantine music scholars and performers into two camps: one supporting, and one opposing his philosophy and his works. His opponents' chief argument is that some works and musical experiments of Simon Karas are highly non-traditional, at the edge of being heretical, at least from their point of view.

== Revisionism ==
Simon Karas proposed several revisions to the standard practice of contemporary Byzantine church singing. While these revisions were at least to some extent accepted by some groups of Byzantine chanters, they are at the same time furiously rejected by some other chanters. This practical division constitutes the main part of the controversy around Karas' name and heritage.

=== Notation ===
In his works, Simon Karas has observed that in many cases the qualitative Byzantine neumes can be read (interpreted) in several different ways, and it is the experience of the chanter, and, to some extent, his personal choice that determine, what particular interpretation will be used in practice in each particular case. For example, there are several alternative interpretations for a combination of neumes "a kentemata above an oligon above a psefiston", and although in practice some readings of this combination can be more frequent than the others, theoretically, all these interpretations would be equally valid. Simon Karas proposed to decrease this ambiguity by re-introducing some of the old (paleographic) qualitative signs, to differentiate between different possible embellishments.

=== Modes interpretation ===
Karas also attempted to revise the classification of musical modes, used by church chanters and choirs, from a musicological point of view, and not necessarily in line with the traditional 8-modes classification system. He also tried to guess and reconstruct the relations and history of these modes and scales, as well as regularities of their internal interval structure.

== Selected works ==
- Method of Greek Music (a series of books)
- Ioannis Maistor Koukouzelis and his era
- Engomia

== Most prominent followers ==
Among the chanters and choirs embracing the theories and practical proposals of Simon Karas at least to some degree are:

- Cappella Romana
- Lycourgos Angelopoulos (and the current practice of the Greek Byzantine Choir in general)
- Vatopedi monastery choir
