= Greek Byzantine Choir =

Greek choir founded in 1977

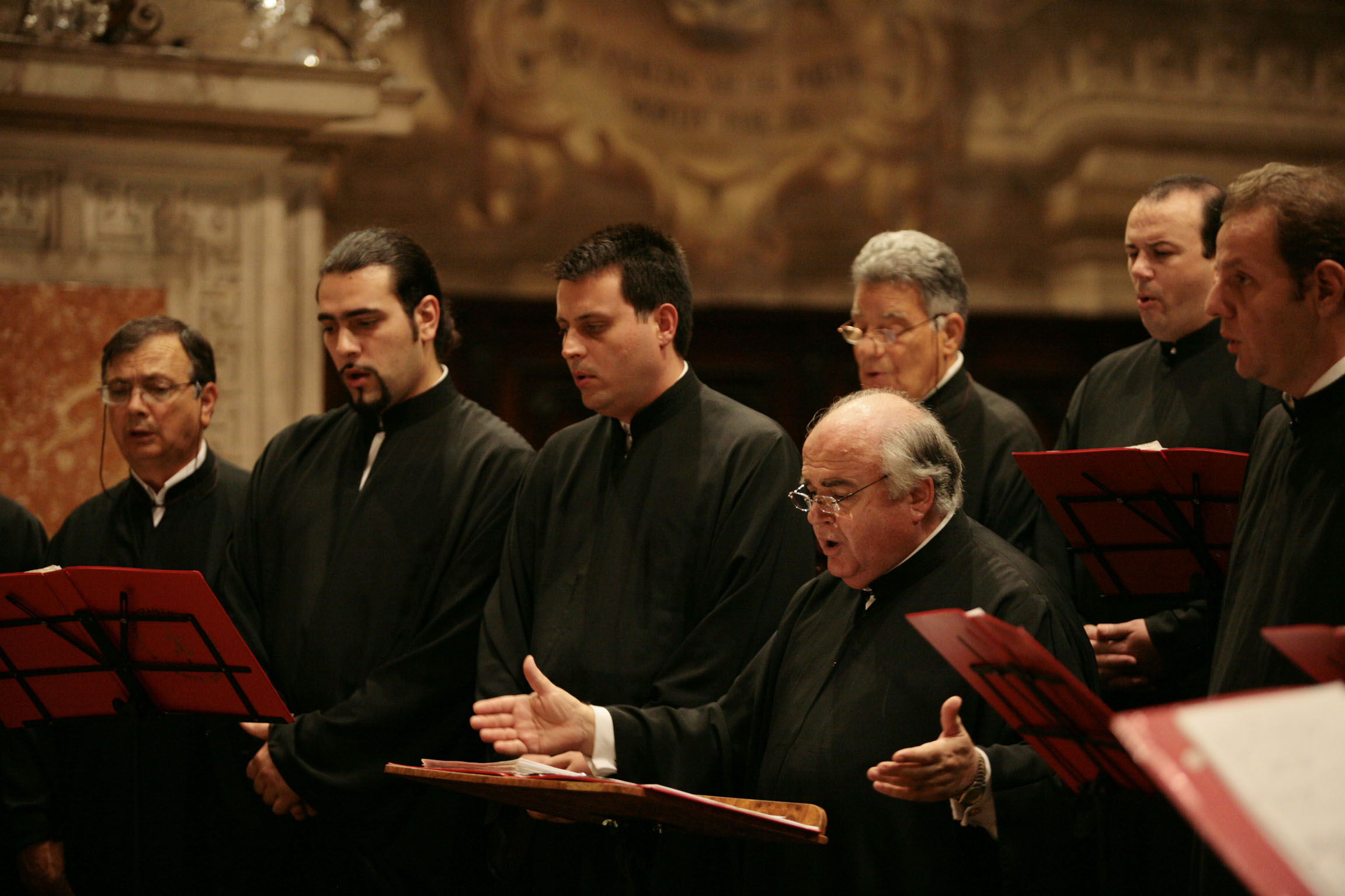

The Greek Byzantine Choir is a choir specializing in singing traditional Byzantine chant. The choir was founded in 1977 by Lykourgos Angelopoulos (1941-2014) and is based in Athens, Greece.

The choir has traveled around the world for concerts, participated in music festivals, and released studio recordings. Being dedicated to religious music, the choir has participated in church services (with an average monastery vigil lasting for about 10 hours of perpetual singing), including the following:

- Vigils at the Mount Sinai Monastery (1983)
- Cologne (1985)
- Mega Spelaion Monastery (1987)
- Vatopedi monastery Mount Athos (1995)
- Cathedral of Saint Demetrios in Thessaloniki (1993)
- Bethlehem (2000)
- Basilica of Sant'Apollinare in Classe (2002)
- Saint Sophia Cathedral, Kyiv (2009)
- Visoki Dečani (2019)
