= Sirtaki =

Type of Greek folkdance

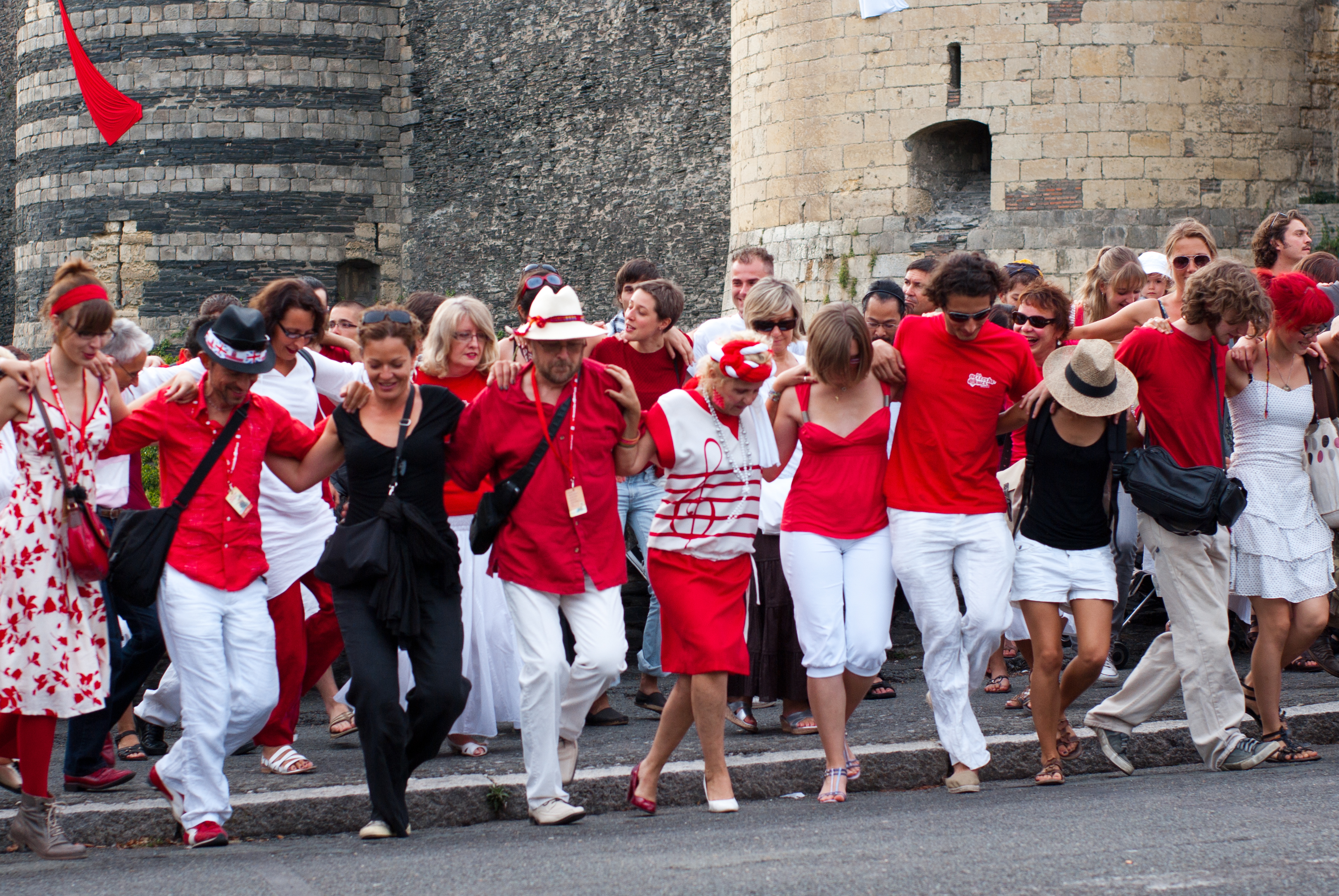
Sirtaki flash mob at Accroche-Cœurs festival.

Sirtaki or syrtaki (Greek: συρτάκι) is a dance of Greek origin, choreographed for the 1964 film Zorba the Greek. It is a recent Greek folkdance, and a mixture of "syrtos" and the slow and fast rhythms of the hasapiko dance. The dance and the accompanying music by Mikis Theodorakis are also called Zorba's dance, the Zorba or "the dance of Zorba". The dance has become popular in Greece and is identified with the Greeks, becoming an invented tradition.

The name sirtaki comes from the Greek word syrtos – from σύρω (τον χορό), which means "drag (the dance)" or "lead (the dance)" – a common name for a group of traditional Greek dances of so-called "dragging" style, as opposed to pidikhtos (πηδηχτός), a hopping or leaping style. Despite its name, sirtaki incorporates both syrtos (in its slower part) and pidikhtós (in its faster part) elements.

== Choreography ==
The dance was created specifically for the film Zorba the Greek rather than using a traditional form of dance. The name sirtaki suggests it was based on a traditional Cretan dance form, "syrtos", a type of dance where the dancers drag their feet instead of hopping, however, the dance also incorporates both a slower hasapiko dance style, and a faster hasaposerviko style. The dance is therefore an amalgamation of three different dance styles. It also has some characteristics of the zeybek dance. The choreography of the dance for the film has been attributed to Giorgos Provias.

During the filming of Zorba the Greek, Stelios Katsivelakis taught choreography to Anthony Quinn (although another dancer teacher contests this, claiming that several dancers, including himself, were involved in teaching Quinn), including various Greek dances such as the Kalamatianos, Chaniotikos syrtos (syrtos of Chania), pentozali with the psalidia (scissor-like) movements, and hasapiko. The zeibekiko was initially omitted, as the director felt it was not a suitable dance for a non-Greek and that the hasapiko looked better on screen. Quinn claimed that because he had problem doing a hopping motion due to a broken foot, he invented the dragging-sliding dance steps that he said a villager taught him, as well as coming up with its name on the fly when the film was being shot. Quinn could not perform the fast part of choreography planned for the final scene by the choreographer, and the choreography had to be changed on the spot. It is claimed that this explains the crane shot moving away from the protagonists at the end of the film.

The dance was named Sirtaki at the first screening of the film.

In Stamatis Kokotas' 1966 song "Στου Όθωνα τα χρόνια" ("In the days of King Otto") there is an anachronistic reference to the king's Bavarian bodyguards dancing sirtaki.

=== Performance ===
Groups of dancers can perform the sirtaki in a line or circle formation with hands held on neighbours' shoulders. When performing alone, the sirtaki-dancer raises his arms horizontally on both sides of the body. Parts of the leg movements may be suggestive of crushing of grapes.

Meter is 4/4, tempo increasing, and often the signature is changed to 2/4 in the fastest part. Accordingly, the dance begins with slower, smoother actions, gradually transforming into faster, vivid ones, often including hops and leaps.

== Guinness World Records ==
On August 31, 2012, the previous Sirtaki Dance Guinness World Record (Cyprus, 2010, 1672 persons) was broken by 5,614 people dancing sirtaki for five minutes by the sea, starting from the port of the city of Volos in Greece. The Association for Social Impact and Culture to the Municipality of Magnisia organized the event on the main beach of the town of Volos under the light of the second full moon of the month. Some 5,614 people, aged from 14 to 89, danced to the music of Mikis Theodorakis' Zorba the Greek, filling the town square and making it into the Guinness World Records. Enthusiasts from Volos, Larisa, Athens, Thessaloniki, Trikala, and the Greek islands joined the regional union of blind people, the national synchronized swimming team and many ordinary citizens. The idea came from a Volos resident, Alexia Halvatzakou, who suggested it to the municipal services as an alternative way to promote the area. The President of the Association for Social Impact and Culture, Costas Halevas, liked the idea and set about organizing the event.
