= Tsiniaris =

Tsiniaris (Greek: τσινιάρης), is a circle Cretan folk dance from Agios Vasileios, Crete, Greece. It is usually danced by older local persons and is very widespread in Rethymno.

== See also ==
- Music of Greece
- Greek dances
