= Domna Samiou =

Domna Samiou (Greek: Δόμνα Σαμίου; 12 October 1928 – 10 March 2012) was a prominent Greek researcher and performer of Greek folk music. She received her first formal musical training from Simon Karas. For over half a century she collected, recorded, and performed traditional songs of Greece (earlier called demotika, nowadays referred to as "paradosiaka" or "traditional"), around the world, appealing not only to the Greek diaspora, but also introducing non-Greek audiences to traditional Greek folk music.

== Early life ==
Born in the poor district of Kaisariani, Athens in 1928 (one of many neighbourhoods established with the influx of Greek refugees from Turkey in 1922), Samiou was the daughter of Greek refugees from the village Bayındır near Smyrna in Asia Minor. Her mother fled to Greece in 1922, while her father, who was a prisoner of war, arrived slightly later during the exchange of populations.

== Career ==
At the age of thirteen, whilst attending night school, Domna Samiou received her first formal musical training from Simon Karas at the Association for the Dissemination of National Music, where she was tutored in Byzantine and folk music, as well as being introduced to the idea of field research in music. Her first professional collaboration was with the National Radio Foundation (E.I.R.), the state-run national radio station of Greece at the time, when she was a member of the Simon Karas choir.

In 1954 she became a full-time employee of the station, working in the National Music Section, in effect the folk music section of E.I.R. Through her work there, she came into contact with the leading traditional musicians of the day, who were part of a great wave of migration from the countryside to Athens. The National Music Section was busy recording them and, as a result, Domna became acquainted with all their various local musical styles. She was herself responsible for supervising records, stage plays and films.

In 1963 Domna Samiou started touring the countryside independently, to record music for the archive she was establishing. Then, in 1971, she left her radio job entirely to focus on her own musical career, accepting an invitation by the composer and performer Dionyssis Savvopoulos to sing at a club called Rodeo, frequented by a youthful anti-junta audience. It marked the beginning of Domna Samiou's impact and influence on generations of young people in Greece. Soon after, she performed at the Bach Festival in London, run at the time by Lina Lalandi. It was a triumphant start to a brilliant musical career: “It made people overcome the embarrassment they felt for folk music”, as she herself stated later.

In 1974, she started her collaboration with Columbia Records, which resulted in a number of LPs over the next years. In 1976-77, together with film directors Fotos Lambrinos and Andreas Thomopoulos, she toured the Greek countryside and produced twenty episodes of 'Musiko Odiporiko' ('Musical Travelogue') on Greek national television (ERT).

In 1981, the Domna Samiou Greek Folk Music Association was founded to preserve and promote Greek traditional music and facilitate the production of records and musical events to the highest standards, free from the demands of commercial record companies.

== Death ==
She died on 10 March 2012 in Athens, following a short illness, at 84 years old.

== Selected works ==
=== Musical editions ===
Published under the label of Domna Samiou Greek Folk Music Association.

- Epic Songs of Warriors and Heroes (2017).
- Folk Fables in Song (2008).
- I Tread the Earth Gently (2008).
- Songs of History and Heroes (2007).
- The Great North Wind and Other Traditional Songs for Children (2007).
- Of Nature and of Love (2006).
- The Akolouthia Of Nymphios (2002).
- Songs of Dame Sea (2002).
- Domna Samiou at Megaron, The Athens Concert Hall (1999).
- Easter Songs (1998).
- Kaneloriza (1995).
- Carnival Songs (1994).
- Songs About Greeks Far From Home (1992, co-production with UNHCR).
- Songs of Asia Minor (1991).

=== Archive material ===
Domna Samiou systematically recorded folk songs from every part of Greece. The material, constituting the Domna Samiou Archive, belongs to the 'Domna Samiou Greek Folk Music Association'.It includes 320 audio tapes, some 1000 cassettes, and around 100 sound reels with studio-recorded material. More than 800 hours of music in total! Also included are Domna's handwritten notes concerning the material she collected, studio recordings, her concerts, published works, etc.

Part of the music data was digitized by the "Lilian Voudouri" Music Library of Greece under the program "Building a Complete Unit for the Documentation and Promotion of Greek Music" funded by the operational program "Information Society 2005-2008".

In 2014, the Association began the major project of digitization and organization of all the music and accompanying material, which was completed in 2016. Afterwards, all the material was organized, sectioned and cataloged. Handy guides were created to allow easy access to particular parts of the file.
