= Pentozali =

Traditional folk dance of the island of Crete

The Pentozali or Pentozalis (Greek: Πεντοζάλης) is the trademark folk dance of the island of Crete. It takes its name from the five (pente) attempt or step (ζάλος zalos being a Cretan Greek word for "step"). It can thus be translated as "five-steps". The name also contains an element of wordplay, as ‘ζάλη’ (zali) means dizziness, and so it may also be interpreted as a dance that can make its dancers dizzy five times over ("five-dizzy"). In fact the dance has ten steps in total.

The Cretan violinist Stefanos Triantafillakis (1715–1800) is credited with composing the music for the dance in 1770–1771.

The Pentozali is a war dance, vigorous, with high jumping movements and allows for much improvisation. It starts either at a fast pace or at a moderate pace and accelerates progressively. The dancers hold each other by the shoulders and form an incomplete circle, which rotates counterclockwise very slowly, or sometimes not at all, because most of the lively steps are semi-stationary. The first dancer is expected to improvise whilst engaging in acrobatics: they and the second dancer link hands (as opposed to laying their arms over each other's shoulders, as the other dancers in the line do) and the second dancer stands still and rigid, so that the first dancer is provided a more stable base from which to perform. Once the first dancer has finished their part, they are expected to break ranks and slowly dance their way towards the back of the line, yielding their place to the second dancer, and so on. This is thought to represent the line of succession of command in battle, if the leader is killed. Both men and women perform the dance, but the steps of the women's dance were traditionally more restrained, because their long dress did not allow for high jumps. Traditional Cretan menswear, on the other hand, facilitates acrobatic dancing as it includes the black βράκα (vraka), a variant of breeches that are worn tight around the waist and thighs and extremely baggy and loose around the hips.

Legend has it that when Turkish armies sailed to Crete in order to crush popular rebellions there, the Cretans would dance Pentozali and the Turkish would flee, fearing the dancers were demonic because of the speed and ferocity of their movement. It was even thought that it was a dance sent from God. Before battle, the Cretans danced it in order to demoralize opposing armies.

Pentozali music is instrumental: the main tune is played either on the violin or on the pear-shaped, bowed Cretan Lyra, to the accompaniment of a Laouto, played not in a melodic but in a more percussive or rhythmic fashion. It is the soloist who usually directs the flow of the dance: he improvises to signal the first dancer to improvise too, and resumes the main tune when it is time for the first dancer to yield his place to another.

Dances vary from island to island and it has become an everyday staple of Greek culture. Every island has their own version and their own style. A version of it is also popular in the Dodecanese islands in the Aegean sea.

== See also ==
- Byzantine music
- Greek dances
- Greek folk music
- Greek music
- Kalamatianos
- Sirtaki
- Syrtos
