= Kalamatianos =

Greek folk dance

The Kalamatianós (Greek: Καλαματιανός, pronounced [kalamati̯aˈnos̠]) is one of the best-known dances of Greece. It is a popular Greek folk dance throughout Greece, Cyprus and internationally and is often performed at many social gatherings worldwide. As is the case with most Greek folk dances, it is danced in chain with a counterclockwise rotation, the dancers holding hands.

Dance in the atrium of the Zappeion on March 3, 1926

It is a joyous and festive dance; its musical beat is 7/8, subdivided into of three parts of 3+2+2 beats, corresponding to 3 steps per bar. There are 12 steps in the dance corresponding to 4 bars of music. These steps include 10 steps counterclockwise ("forward") followed by 2 steps clockwise ("backwards"). Depending on the occasion and the dancers' proficiency, certain steps may be taken as jumps or squats.

The lead dancer usually holds the second dancer by a handkerchief, thus allowing them to perform more elaborate steps and acrobatics. The steps of the Kalamatianós are the same as those of the Syrtos, but the latter is slower and more stately, its beat being an even 4/4.

== History ==
The roots of the Kalamatianos can be found in antiquity. Homer, in the Iliad, describes three performances made around the spear of Achilles that depict a dance in an open circle. The ancient Spartans had a dance called ὅρμος hórmos, which was a syrto-style dance described in detail by Xenophon where a woman led a male into dance using a handkerchief. Lucian states that the hórmos dance was performed in an open circle and was done by young men and women. The men would dance vigorously while the women danced with modest movements.

In the 19th century, this dance was called Συρτός ὁ Πελοποννήσιος Syrtós ho Peloponnḗsios. It is believed to have acquired the name kalamatianos from the town of Kalamata in southern Greece; most Greek dances are commonly named after the villages or areas from which they are considered to have originated.

Kalamatiano songs are many and popular – some of the more traditional kalamatiano songs are Samiotissa (The girl from Samos), Mandili Kalamatiano (Kerchief from Kalamata), Milo Mou Kokkino (My Red Apple), To Papaki (The Duckling), Mou Pariggile To Aidoni (The Nightingale sent me a message), Ola Ta Poulakia (All Birds), Palamakia (Clapping) and more. An especially haunting example of the kalamatianos, Mekapses Yitonissa (Μέκαψες Γειτόνισσα), was recorded for the National Geographic Society's groundbreaking Music of Greece album, released in 1968.

The Kalamatiano is played at special occasions, such as Easter and weddings.

== Contemporary influence ==
The American jazz composer, Dave Brubeck, well known for his exploration of asymmetrical rhythms in his own music, used a variant of the rhythm of the Kalamatianos for his Unsquare Dance, though the measures are divided into two groups of 4 followed by 3 beats rather than 3 followed by 4.

Donald Swann used the rhythm of the Kalamatianos (acknowledged in the score) in the fourth movement of his Requiem for the Living.

The 1960s popular singer, formerly known as Cat Stevens, wrote and performed a song, Ruby Love, in 7/8 time with a distinctive Greek flavour. Stevens, who would later convert to Islam, has paternal Greek Cypriot roots. Near the end of the 2002 film, My Big Fat Greek Wedding, the cast dances the kalamatianos to the song "Ωραία που είναι η νύφη μας" (Orea Pou Ine I Nifi Mas/How Wonderful Is Our Bride) at Ian and Toula's wedding reception.

== Song example ==
Milo Mou Kokkino is a traditional kalamatiano song from Western Macedonia.

=== Lyrics ===
Μήλο μου κόκκινο, ρόιδο βαμμένο (×2)
Γιατί με μάρανες το πικραμένο 1

Παένω κ’ έρχομαι μα δεν σε βρίσκω (×2)
Βρίσκω την πόρτα σου μανταλομένη 1

Τα παραθυρούδια σου φεγγοβολούνε (×2)
Ρωτάω την πόρτα σου, που πάει η κυρά σου; 1

Κυρά μ’ δεν είναι ‘δώ, πάησε στην βρύση (×2)
Πάησε να βρει νερό και να γεμίσει 1

=== Translation ===
My red apple, painted (like a) pomegranate,
why have you wilted me, the bitter one?

I come and go, but cannot find you
I try your door, and it's locked.

Your windows are always lighted
I ask your door, "Where has your lady gone?"

"My lady is not here, she is at the wellspring
She's gone to find water and to fill (her bucket)".

== See also ==
- Armenian dance
- Assyrian folk dance
- Ballos
- Faroese dance
- Greek dances
- Greek folk music
- Ikariotikos
- Kalamatianó (music)
- Kurdish dance
- Music of Greece
- Nisiotika
- Pentozali
- Sousta
- Syrtos
- Tamzara
- Tsamiko
- Turkish dance
