= Keramoti, Naxos =

Keramoti Κεραμωτή
- Community
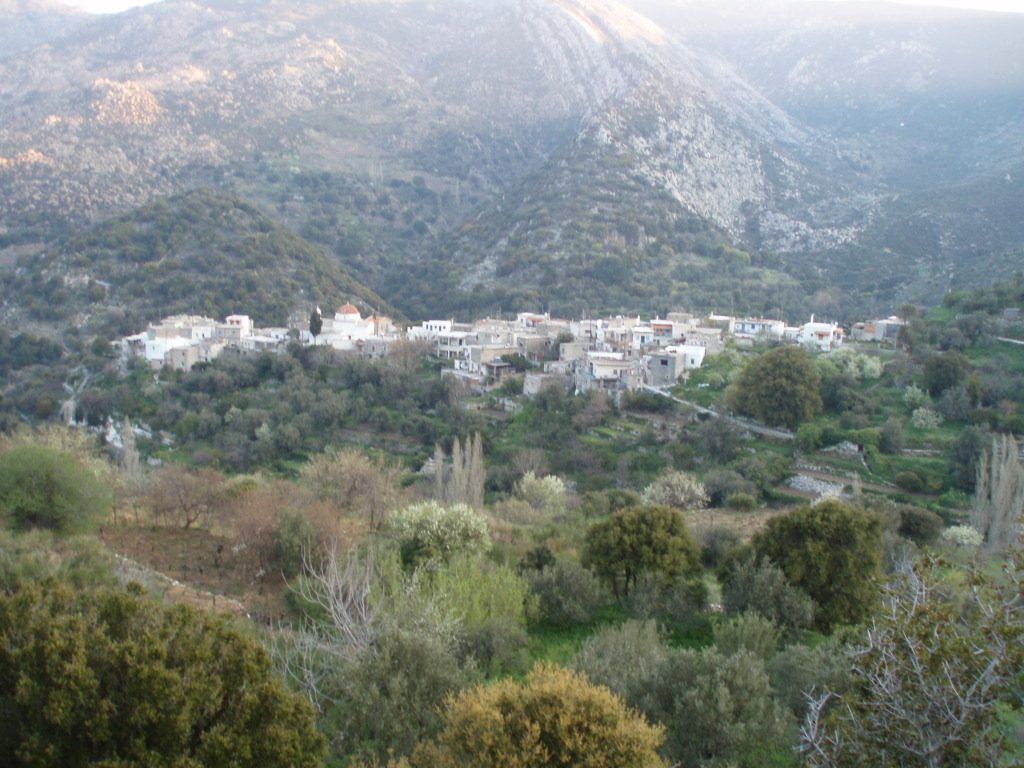

- Location within Greece
- Coordinates: 37°06.5′N 25°31′E
- Country: Greece
- Administrative region: South Aegean
- Regional unit: Naxos
- Municipality: Naxos and Lesser Cyclades
- Municipal unit: Drymalia
- Elevation: 460 m (1,510 ft)

Population (2021)
  - Community: 56
- Time zone: UTC+2 (EET)
  - Summer (DST): UTC+3 (EEST)
- Postal code: 843 02
- Area code: 22850
- Vehicle registration: EM

Keramoti (Greek: Κεραμωτή) is a mountain village in the northeastern part of the island of Naxos in the Cyclades, Greece. Keramoti is part of the municipal unit of Drymalia. It is situated 2 km southwest of Koronos and 12 km east of Naxos town. Together with Apeiranthos, Koronos and Komiaki, it is the emery producing area of Naxos.

== Historical population ==
Year	Population
1981	106
1991	119
2011	58
2021	56

== See also ==
- List of communities of the Cyclades
