= Ballos =

Dance of the Greek islands

The Ballos (Greek: Μπάλος) is a Greek folk dance and a form of sirtos. There are also different versions in other Balkan countries.

The Ballos is of Greek origin, with ancient Greek elements. The name originates in the Italian ballo via Latin "ballo" which derives from the Greek verb "βαλλίζω" ballizo, "to dance, to jump").

The melody of a ballos is generally joyous and lyrical which is typical of the music of the Aegean Islands. This couples' dance incorporates all the elements of courtship: attraction, flirtation, display of masculine prowess and feminine virtue, pursuit, and rejection followed by eventual capture and surrender.

Its origin is in the island culture of Greece. Men could not approach women easily, so they created this dance in order to "flirt" with them. There are various forms of the ballos around the islands. The simplest is one in which a single couple goes through a series of spontaneous figures. In another version many couples dance simultaneously as if alone on the dance floor. Yet another version is introduced by a Sirtos. In its most complicated form, a number of couples go through various figures, somewhat reminiscent of the European minuet. Ballos songs are popular and there are many of them. One of the most popular Ballos song from Asia Minor is: Τι σε μέλλει εσένανε; Ti se mellei esenane ("What do you care?") etc. In Cyprus the ballos is a men's dance and is interwoven with an amane type song based on the byzantine scale. The songs are always sad and require a very talented singer.

== See also ==
- Greek dances
- Ikariotikos
- Kalamatianos
- List of dances
- Music of Greece
- Sousta
- Syrtos
