= Ikariotikos =

Traditional Greek dance

Ikariotikos (Greek: Ικαριώτικος) or Kariotikos (Greek: Καριώτικος, sometimes written with an apostrophe as 'Καριώτικος) is a traditional dance and accompanying song originating in Ikaria, a Greek island in the North Eastern Aegean Sea. The name Kariotikos is mostly used by the locals of Ikaria.

The Ikariotikos dance is typically slow, and is often accompanied by traditional music from the island of Ikaria, such as “Rachiotikos,” “Sympethera,” etc.

The song "My love in Ikaria" (Greek: Η αγάπη μου στην Ικαριά), whose music and lyrics were written by Giorgos Konitopoulos, and which has been notably performed by Yiannis Parios in 1982, has become associated with the Ikariotikos dance outside of Ikaria and the Ikarian diaspora due to the popularity of the Yiannis Parios version, which is higher in tempo than the traditional version.

The song is danced slowly with mobility in both legs and body. Each village has its own version, but it typically begins with a small kick with the left foot, followed by a back step and a light hip movement, with two steps to the right.

Oftentimes, as a precursor to Ikariotiko, “Ampelokoutsoura,” another traditional dance from Ikaria, itself a variation of Ikariotiko, with different steps and positions, is danced.

Traditionally, Ikariotiko is played using instruments such as a violin, laouto, tsampouna (tsampounofilaka), politiki lyra, etc.

In the version accompanied with the song “My love in Ikaria,” the dance is similar to the traditional version, but at a much faster pace. There are three parts to the dance: In the first part of the dance we have slow moving walking steps (similar to a Sta Tria), while the second, part we move into a dance similar in steps to the Issios of Kalymnos and then in the third part we move into the quick steps with the mobility of both legs and body.

Music and dancing are major forms of entertainment in Ikaria. Throughout the year Ikarians host baptisms, weddings, parties and religious festivals where one can listen and dance to traditional Ikarian music.

== See also ==
- Ballos
- Greek dances
- Greek folk music
- Greek music
- Kalamatianos
- Syrtos
