= Sousta =

Greek folk dance

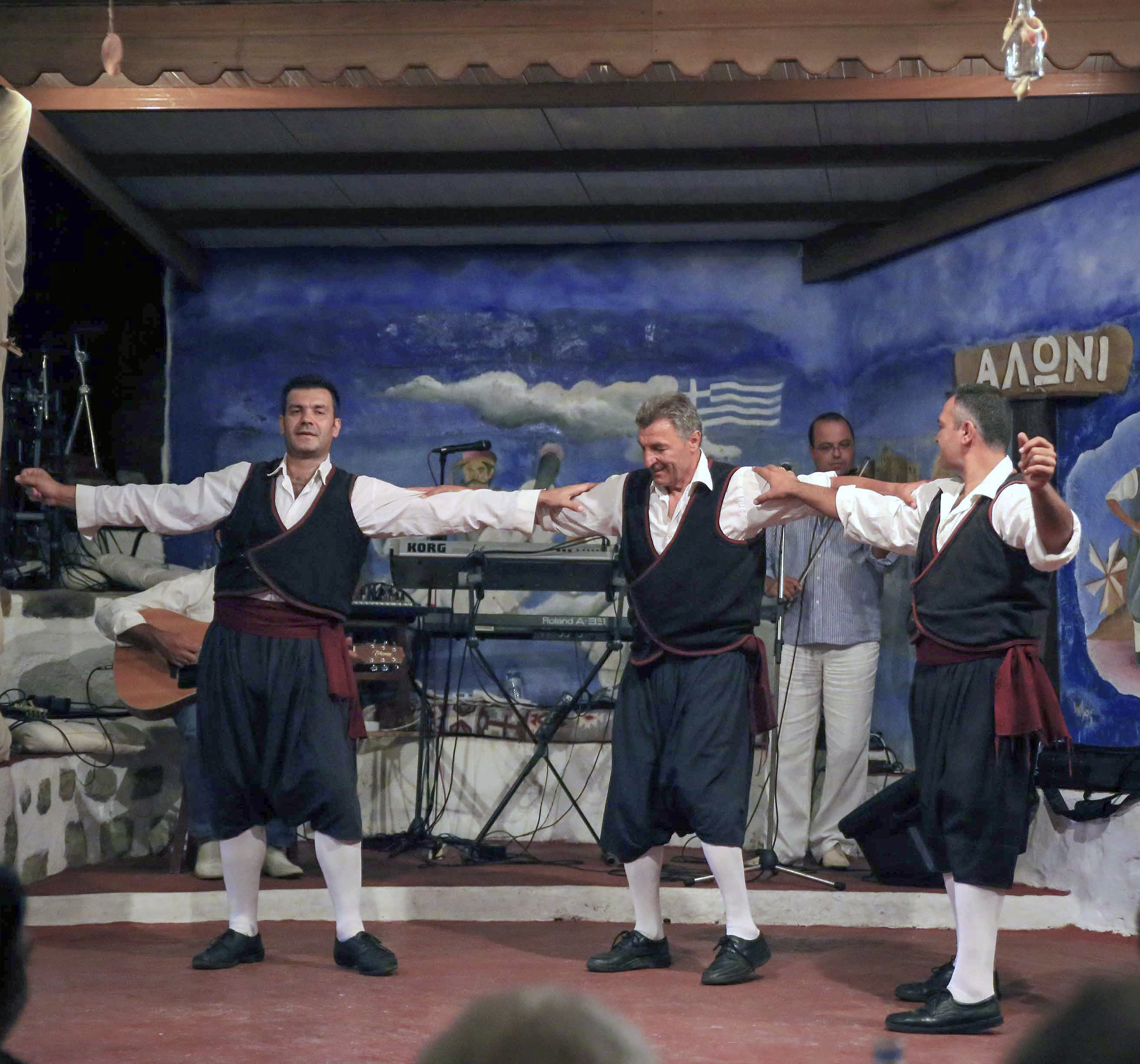

Sousta (Greek: Σούστα) is a Greek folk dance, performed at weddings as an activity of courtship between husband and wife. It originates from Ancient Greece, and holds prominence in Dodecanese Islands, and the broader Aegean region. It is the second most common Greek dance, after the Syrtos, with many Greek islands and villages adopting their own version. The performance of the dance reflects various gender roles, inter-played with values of romance and marriage. The Sousta acted as a socialisation process between the youth of a village, evolving into a dance central to these youth as they grew up and formed relationships with others. Socially, the Sousta also functioned as a visible verification of courtship, namely paying respects to the wife and her family. The Sousta is most commonly performed as a three-step dance, with a 'hopping' motion and crossed-over hands.

There are elements of eroticism and courtship acted out in the dance, which is usually performed by pairs of men and women dancing opposite. Another form is where all the dancers in a row follow the first dancer who moves in complex patterns. Almost every island of the Aegean has a sousta dance.

== History and tradition ==
The Sousta originated from ancient Greece, in the island of Crete. Men working with medicine on Ancient Crete sometimes danced the Sousta to appease the earth goddess Rea. By dancing with large leaps, which was believed to influence growth in nature, the Sousta was seen as a dance for fertility. The Sousta was also seen as a dance of the sea, linked to its origins from the island of Crete. The dance's swaying motion, with two steps forward and one back, re-enacted boats at sea pushing against large waves.

The dance in the late nineteenth and early twentieth century was linked to courtship and love, away from fertility.

As a couple's dance at weddings before the Independence of Greece in 1947 there are numerous variations of the dance across Greece, most notably throughout the Dodecanese Islands. The Sousta is also connected with war, and holds significance during the inter-war period of 1925–1940, in Rhodes, Greece. The Dodecanesian islands were amongst the last to be granted independence with Greece in 1947. During celebrations of the islands' liberation, and the exit from war, all villages danced the Sousta. Prior to independence, and under the control of Italy, Dodecanesian villages had separate rooms across from monasteries as a space to celebrate the dance. Between 1925–1940, the southern coastal village of Kattavia performed the Sousta to strengthen their social unity with emphasis on courtship.

It relates to the ancient war dance of the Pyrichi group, and was implemented as a means of training and testing one's agility and stamina. The Sousta as a war dance was seen to shift the dancers close together, creating a human shield. Greeks in war combat followed the rhythm and patterns learnt for the Sousta dance, as an offensive and defensive strategy.

As a wedding dance, performed most frequently on Sundays, the Sousta is associated with a level of courtship and love between the newlyweds, and also allows for other couples at a wedding to express their affection and honour for each other.

The Sousta represents the interplay of gender roles within its performance. To initiate the dance, men would invite women discreetly to protect the female's identity. Any men who did not lead the dance often sung with the women. This is due to the lead dancer's position to control the flow and coordination of the performance and other dancers. Only a male could lead the dance, while performing around the female to ensure her privacy was upheld. This reflected a sense of honour that the male carries through the dance. As a result of the honour the male grants the female, women in the dance reveal a sense of privacy. More prominently in the twentieth century Greece, females carried with them the image of the family and home life, as well as religion.

The Sousta involved socialisation between the youth, with older children often inviting the younger to play. While young women would learn the three steps to the basic dance, the men would spend time practising their own versions. To formally enter the dance as a recognised community event, young girls needed to be 14 years old, while young boys must have been at least 16 years old. The aim of the dance was for the males to socialise with the females, and eventually create serious relationships. This was necessary as the privacy or a young woman was upheld; males and females had no other form of socialisation outside of the dance.

As of the late twentieth to twenty-first century, the villages and Dodecanese islands of Greece dance the Sousta less frequently. The Syrto, which is now the most common Greek folk dance, has overtaken the Sousta in its popularity. This is due to the Sousta not being taught in island or village school curriculum, whereas the Syrto has continued as a staple national dance.

== Payment during the dance ==
As a sign of appreciation or recognition for the skill of a dancer, spectators could throw coins on the floor or towards the instrumentalists. This could be accompanied by the use of paper notes, being attached to instruments, belts or slapped on foreheads.

The Sousta was danced with a bowl, in which viewers of the dance would throw money as a form of their appreciation for the lead dancer. As well, members of the village Church body would walk around with bottles or glasses of alcohol, often Ouzo, to offer the lead dancer when a donation was made. The money received from donations to the bowl during the dance would be delivered to the Church, funding construction, salaries of priests and public events. As a result, the level of improvised dance practised by the males outside of formal events was necessary to present talent and grace, which in turn attracted spectators to donate and praise the lead dancer.

Women could praise dancers who were either her husband or son, but were forbidden against paying young, unmarried women, or requesting a song.

== Regional variations ==
The Sousta exists with differing variations throughout Greece and the wider Balkans. However, there are officially acknowledged versions of the dance, which range from Crete, Rhodes, Halki, Leros, Kalymnos, Karpathos, Kos, Tilos, Samos and Symi.

There are some documented versions adapted to the mainland. These include the region of Thrace in north-east Greece, and Macedonia.

== Common steps ==
The most common version of the Sousta is a three step dance with each dancers' hands linked. Two 'jump steps' are made forward, and one jump is made back. The dance is often observed to be energetic, with a constant 'hopping' motion. However, due to its form as a 'couple's dance', the Sousta allows room for improvisation.

Cross-linked arms were formed as an expression of unity, as well as ensuring the jump-steps of the dance were performed in unison. A dancer's right arm held the left of the dancer proceeding, with the left arm holding the right of the dancer preceding across their waists. The criss-cross pattern formed has also been seen to symbolise connections with religion, and the image of the cross.

In villages, young men would prepare for a significant amount of time to create their own version of the dance. By practising their version Sousta outside of school, they further socialised with other village people and prepared to be the lead dancer. Often, the couples would dance opposite each other. However, different forms of the dance have been observed, where the dancers from a single row with a leader, who was a male and was able to execute their improvised version of the dance. In the form of the couple's dancing, the male could approach the female with a spin, or the female could twirl and embrace the male. The fast-paced nature of the Sousta's jumps suited younger dancers, and the courtship they portrayed in young couples.

The jump-steps performed in the Sousta resemble a recoiling spring after compression, of which the dance has its name. The linking of male and female partners in the dance, through holding a handkerchief and cross-linked arms, showed the Sousta as a dance for pairs. The handkerchief used was always white, as a symbol for purity between the couples and their love.

== Common musical composition ==
The music to the Sousta dance is most commonly played using a lyre, violin, lauoto, and mandolin.

The varying instruments that accompany the Sousta could be played by several people within the village, with the most common being a shepherd. As a part of the fame of the dance and cultural significance it carried up until the mid-twentieth century, each village would often present one key instrument player as their best. Whoever was considered to most successfully represent the village had their own variation of the song. Technique through finger-style and bowing would consist of the differences between their version and a traditional Sousta song. In the case of several performers, any instrumentalist would not leave his position to dance, having to wait for someone to replace the role and ensuring the dance can continue. Those playing smaller instruments, such as the laouto and lyre, could represent their skill be playing behind their head, or holding their instrument up in the air. Instrumentalists with the most technical skill could go on to play for other villages, or represent their own village in larger gatherings.

The songs were often vocally driven, sung predominately by women and accompanied by other folk instruments such as the clarinet and drums. However, women never played any musical instrument, with their participation regarding singing and dancing. The musical meter follows patterns of 7/8, 8/8, 2/4 as well as 3/4.

On some occasions, the Sousta could be danced without music, and only singing. This approach was rarely seen at socially-recognised events, and occurred when dancers would participate informally.

== See also ==
- Greek music
- Greek dances
- Greek folk music
- Kalamatianos
- Ballos
- Cretan music
- Syrtaki
- Nisiotika
