= Pidikhtos =

Type of dance

Pidikhtos (Greek: πηδηχτός), is a Greek folk dance with Cretan origin, dancing in a circle formation. It is very widespread in Crete and the Greek islands.

== See also ==
- Music of Greece
- Greek dances
