= Syrtos =

Group of Greek folk dances

Syrtos (Note: Modern Greek συρτός syrtós; accusative singular συρτό syrtó; plural συρτοί syrtoí; from σύρω sýro 'to drag [the dance]'. Also known as sirtos or sirto in English.) is a traditional Greek dance in which the dancers link hands to form a chain or circle, headed by a leader who intermittently breaks away to perform improvised steps.

Syrtos and its relative kalamatianos are the most popular dances throughout Greece and Cyprus, and are frequently danced by the Greek diaspora worldwide. They are very popular in social gatherings, weddings and religious festivals. Syrtos and kalamatianos use the same dance steps, but the syrtos is in 4/4 time and the kalamatianos is in 7/8 time, organized in a slow (3 beat), quick (2 beat), quick (2 beat) rhythm.

Syrtos and kalamatianos are line dances and circle dances, done with the dancers in a curving line holding hands, facing right. The dancer at the right end of the line is the leader. He may also be a solo performer, improvising showy twisting skillful moves as the rest of the line does the basic step. While he does this, the next dancer in line stops dancing and holds him up with a twisted handkerchief linking their hands, so he can turn and not fall down, as in the Antikristos. In some parts of syrtos, pairs of dancers hold a handkerchief from its two sides.

Rennell Rodd (1892) suggests that the dance is an imitation of the action of drawing in the seine net. C. T. Dimaras describes an inscription from the times of Caligula, which implied that already at these times Syrtos was considered an ancient Greek dance of local tradition.

== History ==
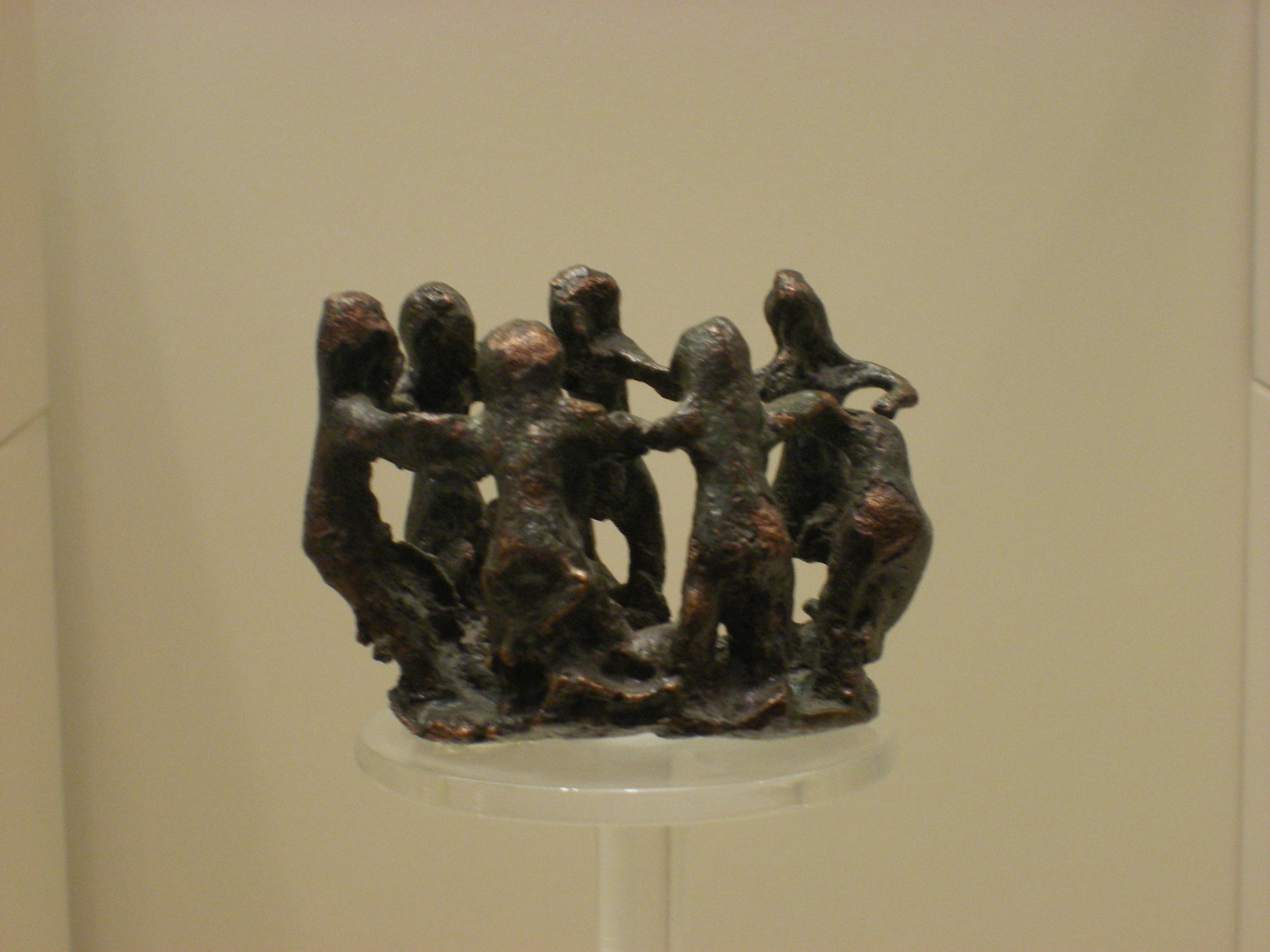
Seven women dancing. Ancient Greek bronze, 8th century BCE, Archaeological Museum of Olympia.

A relevant ancient Greek dance may be the "Hormos", literally "a string".

== Regional variation ==
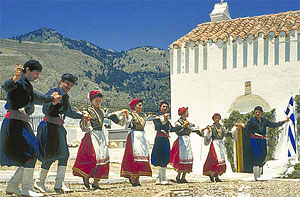
Syrtos dance.

The Greek mainland, from the Peloponnese and Thessaly to Macedonia and Thrace, uses mainly the 7/8 rhythm form of the dance, in contrast to Crete, the Aegean islands, Asia Minor and Constantinople that use 4/4.

=== Syrto-kalamatianos ===
Kalamatianos syrtos or syrto-kalamatianos are the most popular Greek folkdance syrtoi in Greece, Cyprus and internationally. The steps of the Kalamatianos are the same as those of the Syrtos, but the latter is slower and more stately, its beat being an even 4/4. Traditionally, it was danced by segregated lines of men and women. The lead dancer usually holds the second dancer by a handkerchief.

=== Nisiotikoi syrtoi ===
Syrtoi from the islands or nisiotikoi, with the relative local Greek culture of the islands.

Nisiotikoi syrtoi include: Kalamatianos, Sousta, Syrtos from Ikaria, Pentozali, Pidikhtos, Rhoditikos, Syrtos from Symi, Skyrianos syrtos, Maleviziotikos, Samiotikos syrtos, Syrtos from Andros, Syrtos Chiotikos, Skopelitikos syrtos, Syrtos from Paros, Syrtos Kithnou, Syrtos Naxou, Zakynthinos syrtos, Syrto Rodou, a dance very widespread in Greek islands and other.

=== Syrtos Koftos ===
Koftos is a Greek dance that is danced in the regions of Thessaly, Epirus and central Greece. The name of the dance comes from the cut in tune/music. It is a faster syrto sta dyo style dance. When the music stops the dancers yell "Hey". When the music stops one also can put their arms up, down, or clap. It can also be danced going backwards and forwards or with partners. "Koftos" in Greek means to cut and the music cuts periodically.

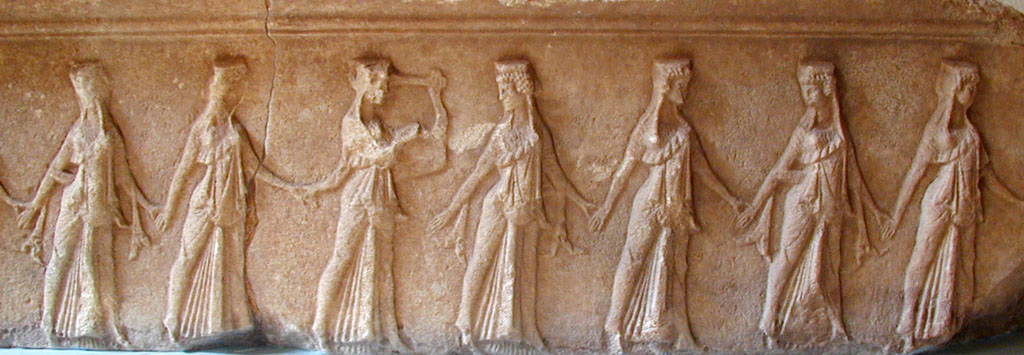
Samothraki choral dancers

=== Cretan Syrtos ===
Cretan Syrtos comes from Western Crete, Chania in particular. According to tradition, during the Fall of Constantinople, the Cretan defenders of the City, during the pauses of battle, sang between themselves poetic words urging each other to bravery, using two melodic motives, Protos Chaniotikos (First, from Chania) and Deuteros Chaniotikos (Second, from Chania) or Kissamitikos (from Kissamos). When the City fell, the Sultan, observing the bravery of the Cretans allowed them to return to their homeland, Western Crete, fully armed. Thus, these two melodies, the archetypes of all other Cretan Syrtoi, were introduced to Crete and in subsequent years they were put into dance. It has been observed by authority of Greek traditional music Domna Samiou, that the Cretan Syrtos resembles to a certain degree the dances of the same name from Constantinople, the Aegean and Asia Minor.

=== Chortarakia (Syrtos Botaitikos) ===
A syrtos from Arcadia, it has become a pan-Hellenic dance. The older, two-part syrtos botaitikos from Palaiopyrgos (formerly Bodias) can also be done to this music. This older form of the dance features men and women in two separate lines, the men behind the women. They merge into one line of mixed men and women and then back to the two lines, using the ancient chain hold that can be seen on ancient Greek vase paintings. The song tells of a young man meeting an old man and asking, "Where are the greens of the meadow, the water from the well?"

=== Politiko syrto ===
Politiko syrto is from the area of Constantinople in Asia Minor. Constantinople was referred as "the city" (or "poli") because of its importance as a seat of culture and trade in the civilized world. Syrto (from the Greek word "syro" meaning to pull or, more accurately, to lead) is characterized by its slow-quick-quick rhythm within its 4/4 meter. There is also a similar dance, the Silivrianos Syrtos.

=== Syrto Kefallonias ===
This dance is from the island of Kefallonia in the Ionian Sea.

=== Syrtos Dance From Bornova (Bournovalios Syrtos) ===
This is danced to a song entitled Ti Tha Yino, Ego Me Sena ("What Shall I Become, I with You?"), the story of an erstwhile courtship:

What am I to do with you Panayiotis? You've stolen my heart and youth. For three years now you've enslaved me and you've tormented me, but I've got your game now, you liar, and know that you've no feelings for me. You come to my neighborhood to chat with me, and you come and go in my house and laugh behind everyone's back. But you must know that my mother will not be ashamed to tell you that you're a liar and a scoundrel. You better leave before she sees you, and face it, she'll kick you out, Panayiotis. Then she'll marry me off to someone else, and I'll be freed from you, Panayiotis.

=== Syrtos Sinkathistos ===
Circle pidikhtos dance, with the steps of simple "syrtos" and the squat-steps of "sygkathistos", a syrtos dance widespread in Thessaly and Thrace.

=== Syrtos Makedonias ===
Syrtos of Macedonia, is another one form of syrtos, danced in the Greek region of Macedonia.

=== Syrtos Pyleas ===
This dance is from a village in Macedonia called Pyleas. One of the variations is called "arm aloft," as dancers raise their arms rhythmically over their heads and back down again. The Dance is mainly done by women.

=== Syrto Bafra ===
Also known as Omali, in the Kerasounta/Giresun region, this dance is called syrto, karshilidiko omal, Λάχανα (lakhana) (after the name of the song, which means "vegetables"), kerasountaiko or kotsihton omal, widespread in Asia Minor. It is a 9/8 rhythm and bears no resemblance to what we usually call syrto, which is usually either a 7/8 kalamatianos or 8/8 rhythm. In this case, the name most likely refers to the style, what we call dragging dances.

== See also ==
- An Dro
- Dabke
- Hora
- Horon
- Khigga
- Kochari
- Music of Greece
- Omal
- Sirtaki
- Tamzara
- Tsamiko
- Pontic Greek folk dance
