= Tempi train crash =

2023 train collision in Greece, killing 57 people

Details
- Date: 28 February 2023; 23:21 EET (21:21 UTC)
- Location: Near Evangelismos, Tempi, Larissa, Thessaly
- Coordinates: 39°50′54.7″N 22°31′0″E
- Country: Greece
- Line: Athens–Thessaloniki mainline
- Operator: Hellenic Train
- Owner: Network manager: OSE; Train operator: Hellenic Train
- Service: Athens– Thessaloniki (IC); Thessaloniki–Athens (freight train)
- Incident type: Head-on collision between two trains
- Cause: Human error, outdated infrastructure, major systemic failures

Statistics
- Passengers: 342
- Crew: 12
- Deaths: 57
- Injured: 180
- Missing: 1 (officially included in the 57 deaths)

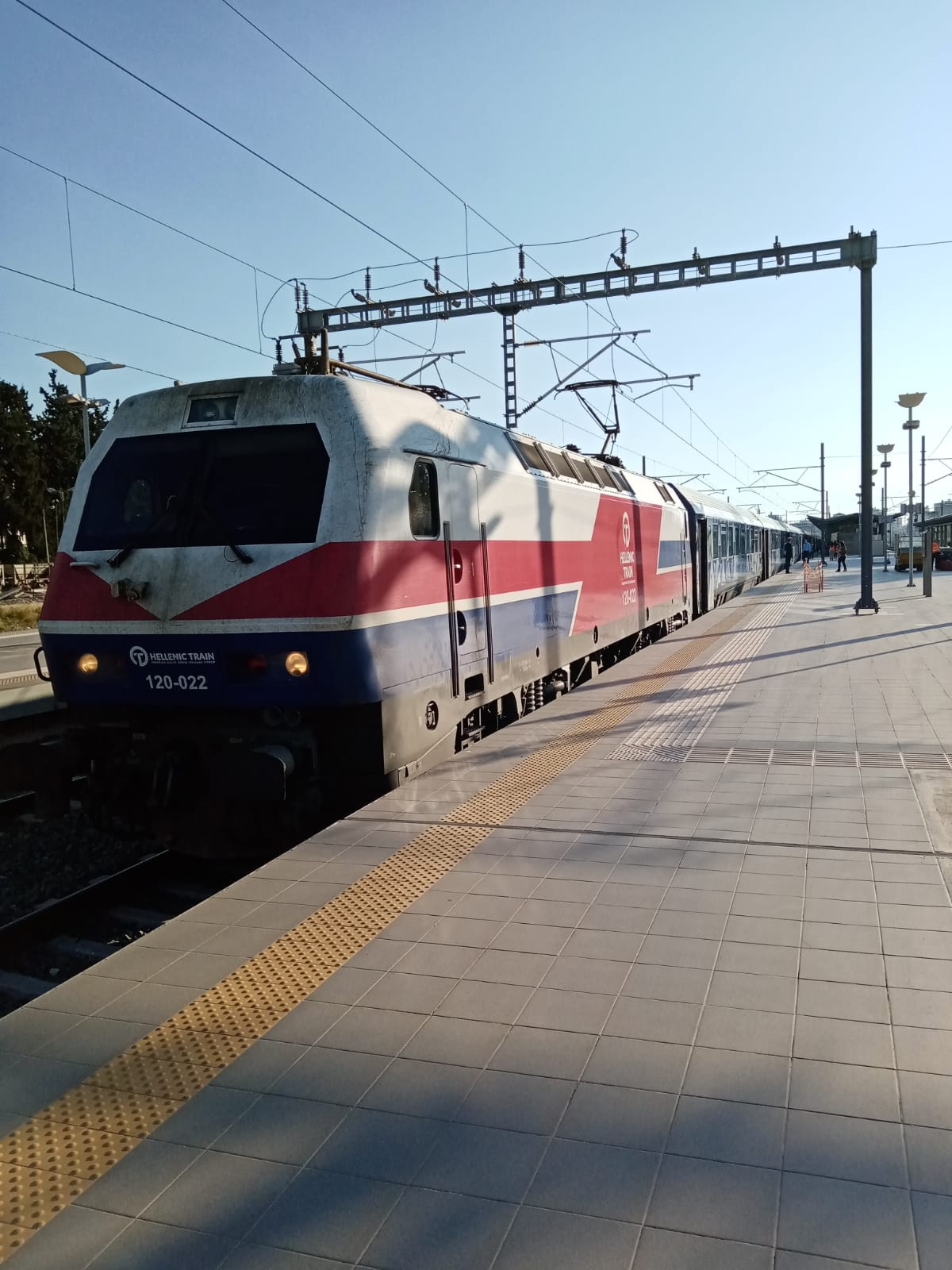
One of the Siemens Hellas Sprinter locomotives involved in the crash in Athens Central Station three months before the crash.

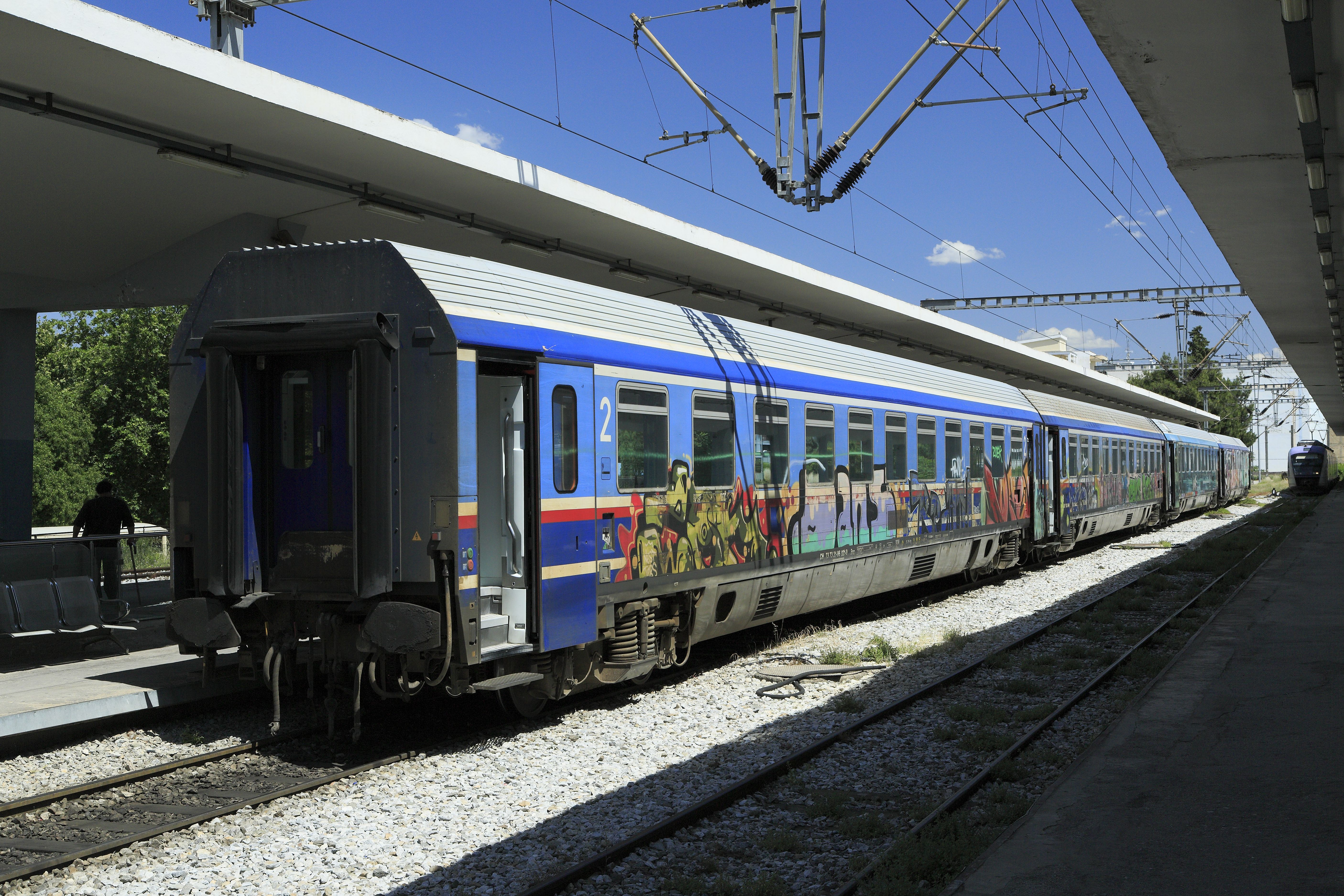
Siemens/Bombardier UIC-Z1 coaches of Hellenic Train that are used on InterCity services in Greece.

Memorial for the victims of Tempi Train Disaster in Thessaloniki Seaside

On 28 February 2023, a head-on collision occurred between two trains south of the Tempe Valley in Greece, about halfway between the Greek villages of Tempi and Evangelismos in the Thessaly region. The collision, follow-up derailment and fireball that ensued involving the InterCity 62 (IC62) passenger train operated by Hellenic Train and an intermodal freight train, killed 57, heavily injured 81 and lightly injured 99 people. The estimated number of people were 352 on the passenger train including 10 staff, and 2 staff on the freight train totalling 354 people on both trains. At the time, it was the most serious railway accident in Europe since 2013, when a train derailment in Santiago de Compostela killed 79 people.

Vigils, angry protests, and clashes with the police occurred throughout Greece following the crash. Beginning on 2 March 2023, railway workers of Hellenic Train and the Athens Metro went on strike to protest the dangerous conditions related to the crash. Following the crash, Transport Minister Kostas Karamanlis resigned, taking responsibility for the crash and for his failure to bring Greek railways to 21st-century standards. However, he was reelected after standing for office just two months after the incident.

The investigation has so far implicated 43 state officials – those directly responsible for the accident, such as the station master and Hellenic Train officials, but also those who failed to carry out the necessary upgrades to the system (European Train Control System and centralized traffic control). Accusations have also been made against officials from the Ministry of Infrastructure who manipulated the site of the accident with "landfilling" that followed the completion of the rescue operation. However, the trial is still a long way off (estimated at the end of 2025), with hundreds of petitions pending for the investigating judge to consider. The development of the investigation process has been closely followed by the Greek press, while private investigations by the relatives of the victims and through independent institutional bodies, such as the bar associations, collecting evidence to support the criminal accusations, are an unprecedented phenomenon for Greek society.

== Incident ==
On Tuesday 28 February 2023, the InterCity (IC) 62 passenger train, (Note: The IC62 passenger train was operated by Hellenic Train and consisted of a rake of Hellenic Train UIC Z1 coaches made by Siemens at SGP Graz and Bombardier at Dunakeszi Carriage Workshops, based on the Viaggio Classic platform (which itself is based on the ÖBB Modularwagen), pulled by Hellas Sprinter locomotive class 120 023.) consisting of an electric locomotive and 8 carriages, departed from Athens railway station at 19:30 EET with Thessaloniki railway station as its final destination. The train carried 431 passengers, most of them students in their 20s returning after the long weekend of Carnival celebrations and Clean Monday.

At 21:00, freight train number 63593 consisting of two electric wagons and 13 flatcars loaded with sheet steel and shipping containers – with a total weight of 618 t and a length of 259 m – departed from Thessaloniki, bound for the OSE freight station at the Thriasio plain.

Upon the arrival of the IC 62 at Palaiofarsalos station the service was interrupted for almost an hour after a fault in the electrification system forced it to wait for its repair. (Note: The conductor of the overhead line of the electrification system is cut from the previous, IC 56 passenger train stopped at the station and falls first on the roof of the train and then on the railway line. A short circuit follows that interrupts the voltage of the overhead contact line on the northbound and southbound tracks.) This fault was one of the causes of the accident as it forced the station master to make constant track changes.

The train departed from Palaiofarsalos station at 22:40 moving until its entrance to the Larissa railway station area, on the southbound track as only on this track the electrification had been restored. Just before the train entered Larissa station, the switchman (Note: Due to a technical problem, the stationmaster was not able to change tracks via the control panel) returned the train to its correct, northbound track. The train disembarked 82 passengers and departed at 23:04, with a delay of 48 minutes.

In order for the train to reach the next station, Neoi Poroi, three points had to be set to straight ahead. The stationmaster successfully set the first point, but missed the next two. Specifically, the tracks remained in the diverted position as they had been placed to accommodate the movement of the previous suburban passenger train 2597, which was operating on the Larissa–Thessaloniki line. As a result, the passenger train left the correct line (north) and at about 23:06–23:07 entered the opposite line (south), where the freight train was already located. The stationmaster, believing he had made the necessary turnouts, gave the locomotive driver movement authority towards Neoi Poroi, while ordering him to ignore the color light signal (red) as it was out of order permanently. The driver of the passenger train realised that he was on the southbound track and requested a repeat of the instruction. The instruction was repeated and the course continued.

For 12 minutes and 18 kilometres the freight train, which was travelling at a speed of 90 km/h and the passenger train, which was travelling at a speed of approximately 150 km/h, were running on the same line until at 23:20, at the height of Evangelismos, both trains collided head on.

=== Crash ===
The head-on collision between the two locomotives caused them to derail and be diverted. The two locomotives of the freight train were thrown to the left and hit the wall of the adjacent A1 motorway, while the passenger locomotive and the first coach (A1) were deflected off the tracks and crashed to the ground, completely destroyed.

The other wagons continued to move, but activation of the brakes (manually by the driver of the freight train, automatically by the air brake of the passenger train) significantly reduced their speed. Immediately afterwards, the wagon restaurant (K) collides head-on with the front of the platform carrying the sheet metal. The wagon is deformed into an S-shape and lands on the wreckage of the locomotive and the first wagon, which together have been reduced to an amorphous mass.
This is followed by the derailment of the third wagon in the line (B2), which hits the ground, bends and is cut into two pieces, with the rear end lifting up and hitting the fourth wagon (B3).

At the moment of collision, when the electrified carriages hit the traction current pylon along the track, two electric explosions are generated. The first one when the locomotive of the passenger train collides with the pylon of the descending line, the second and bigger one when the electric freight locomotive collides with the pylon of the ascending line.

Sparks appear to have ignited spilt liquid fuel and created the initial fireball. This fireball, which lasted for 2 seconds and was on its way to dissipation, was refuelled by a second fuel release, which renewed and fed the fireball for a further 4 seconds, doubling the size of the phenomenon (the first fireball was 40 m in diameter, the second 80 m). The fireball created a very large heat load for the structures and occupants within its radiating area.

After the fireball is extinguished, three pool type fires continue their destructive work. The first fire breaks out near the locomotives of the freight train, fueled by silicone oil spilt around, and burns at low intensity for an unknown amount of time. The second fire flares up underneath the dining car, consuming the last remaining fuel in the fireball, and fed by other fuels such as silicone oil from the engines, it continues to burn with great intensity for about an hour. This fire became so intense in the first 30 minutes that the first attempt to extinguish it at 00:02 (43 minutes after the fire started) by a single fire engine had little to no effect. The third fire broke out from an unknown source under carriage B2. Initially of low intensity, it burned the 16-metre-long car to the ground in 40 minutes.

=== "Flash fire" debate ===
The cause of the formation of the flash fire and the subsequent fires is still under investigation, as opinions differ.

According to the findings of the Hellenic Fire Service, Hellenic Train and the forensic experts who investigated the scene of the accident at the request of the prosecutor, fireball was caused by the second electric arc, which ignited the silicone oils in the transformers of the two locomotives, which leaked into the environment. Specifically, it is claimed that "the fire that broke out immediately after the collision of the trains, was caused by the electrical discharges generated by the cutting of the power cables of the electric locomotives with a nominal voltage of 25,000 volts, combined with the spraying of the cooling oil of the power transformers of the locomotives generated during the collision".

This reason has been disputed by technical advisers to the victims' families, who claim that silicone oils are difficult to ignite. When the results of the "General Chemical State Laboratory"'s analysis of samples from the crash site, which indicated the presence of xylene and toluene in the soil, became known, the findings of the technical consultants pointed to an unknown fuel (aromatic hydrocarbons) that was secretly transported to the commercial train, leaked, ignited and created the fireball. This view seems to be shared by HARSIA. According to them, the sparks created by the emergency brake ignited liquid spilled fuel. Although the nature of the fuel has not been ascertained, the form of the initial ignition and the formation of the fireball suggest that it was a liquid volatile fuel (aromatic hydrocarbons) of about 2,5 tonnes. HARSIA points out that the immediate filling of the site destroyed evidence to such an extent that the identification of the fuel is in doubt. However, it has not yet completed its investigation in this respect.

=== Causes of the fatality ===
According to the official conclusion of the competent state authority, the accident was caused by the decision of the stationmaster of Larissa to use the manual setting of route instead of the automated one. In doing so, he "forgot" to return two points he had previously moved to the correct track. As a result of this mistake, the passenger train went onto the wrong track, resulting in a collision with the freight train. The mistake went unnoticed by the stationmaster.

The failure of the drivers of passenger trains to react as they should have when they realized that they were on the descending line is also considered a causal factor.

The following two factors have been identified as important:

The neglect of the Greek railways since the years of the economic crisis. OSE does not carry out maintenance and renewal work on the infrastructure, except when breakdowns occur.
Delay in the signature and execution of contract 717 (installation of signalling and control systems on the Athens - Thessaloniki - Promahonas line).

== Rescue operation—casualties ==
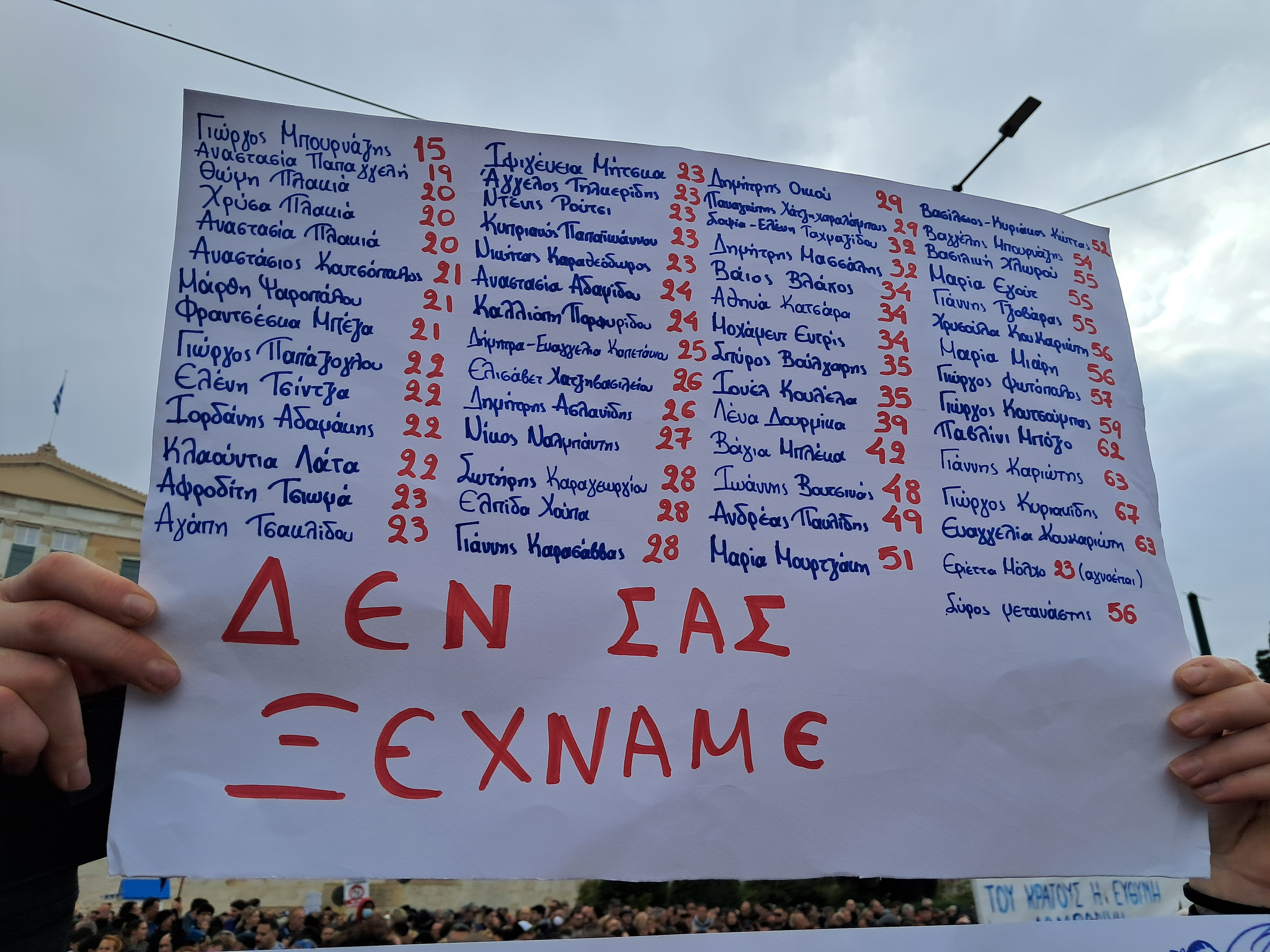
The names of the 57 victims of the Tempi train crash, as seen from the banner that a protester held in the protests for the second anniversary of the crash in 2025. Their memory is widely commemorated, and their names have been written in the area around the Monument of the Unknown Soldier, ensuring that their memory is always remembered.

In an interview with ERT, the governor of the Thessaly region, Kostas Agorastos, reported that the first four carriages of the passenger train were derailed, and the first two carriages caught fire and were "almost completely destroyed". Passengers reportedly escaped the train through windows that were either broken in the crash or in their attempt to escape. Many panicked and some were trapped in carriages that were tilted at least 45 degrees. Rescuers were able to open some of the car doors. The force of the impact was able to completely destroy the locomotive of the passenger train while the locomotives of the freight train were pushed against the freight cars they were towing.

Two minutes after the accident, at 23:24, the first call for help was received by 112 from a passenger. At 23:40, the Hellenic Fire Service arrives on the scene with 40 firefighters and 17 vehicles, followed 10 minutes later by 4 ambulances and a mobile unit with a doctor, while hospitals in the area were alerted to be ready to receive victims. By dawn on 1 March, 32 bodies had been recovered and 85 injured passengers had been taken to hospital.

Ages of the victims
Group age	Number
15–25	23
26–35	12
36–46	3
46+	16

Around 150 firefighters, including members of the Special Disaster Response Unit (ΕΜΑΚ) and the Special Forest Operations Unit (ΕΜΟΔΕ), were deployed to the scene with 17 vehicles and 4 cranes, while the National Emergency Aid Centre (ΕΚΑΒ) sent 30 ambulances. The main effort in finding and rescuing the survivors was made by crane, as the first two passenger cars – which had overturned and fallen on top of each other, trapping the passengers inside – had to be separated and removed to allow the firefighters to get inside. The rescue operation was completed on 3 March, following a thorough search of the site and the recovery of the last of the biological material to facilitate identification. Autopsies and DNA identification of the victims was started on 1 March by a team of forensic experts assisted by members of the Hellenic Police Forensic Science Division.

Layout of the passenger train. In red are the dead per carriage, in green the injured

According to Hellenic Railways, it is estimated that there were 342 passengers and 10 staff on board the passenger train and two staff on board the service train on this part of the route. Of the seven coaches of the passenger train, most of the dead (27) were in the second coach, (K) the canteen of the train, followed by the passengers in the first coach (A1) in order of connection (15), the third coach (B2) in order of connection (9) and 2 dead in the fourth coach (B3).

The sole survivor of the first carriage (A1) is 21-year-old Gerasimos, who was ejected from the carriage during the crash and discovered in a coma in a nearby field. Despite being treated at specialized brain injury rehabilitation facilities in Hanover, Boston, and Milan, as of January 2026 he remains in a coma. The greatest damage, primarily due to the fire caused by the explosion (causes of which remain unclear at present), occurred in the canteen carriage (K in the diagram). This carriage not only derailed and landed in the fields next to the tracks but was also crushed by the third carriage (B2). According to the fire brigade spokesman, the passengers were "crushed by the wagons and then set on fire". The most typical case of injury suffered by passengers on this particular carriage is that of three 19-year-old girls from Kalabaka. The two twin sisters and their cousin, who were travelling by train for the first time, found themselves at the center of the resulting "fireball". The three girls were identified through DNA testing after their bodies were dematerialized due to the high temperatures (1,000 degrees Celsius). The same family had also lost five relatives in a previous mass casualty disaster, the Mati fire in 2018. A total of 32 of the victims were identified through DNA. In the third carriage, B2, 9 people were killed, most of them from the front of the carriage, while 4 who were thrown from the carriage managed to survive. In coach B3, there were only 2 casualties as a result of the derailment, but the smoke inhalation caused serious respiratory problems for the passengers.

Nationalities of the victims
Nationality	Number
Greece	46
Albania	6
Cyprus	2
Bangladesh	1
Romania	1
Syria	1

One victim, Erietta, a 23-year-old student at the Aristotle University of Thessaloniki, is thought to have been in the canteen but no match has been found between her DNA and any of the human remains. The last search for remains was carried out at the beginning of April 2024, with the help of three trained dogs, at the site where soil excavated from the accident site had been transported and stored. The album "Erietta Tempi 28.02.2023..." was released in memory of the girl. The album release was attended by the Greek President of the Republic, Katerina Sakellaropoulou.

About 250 surviving passengers, including those with minor injuries, were evacuated from the collision site by bus to Thessaloniki. Fifty-seven people were killed and 80 others were injured, with 25 of them suffering serious injuries. Of the injured, 66 were hospitalized, with six being admitted to intensive care units. The rail disaster is the deadliest in Greek history.

On 3 March, the first funeral was held for a victim, a 34-year-old mother from Katerini.

== Aftermath ==
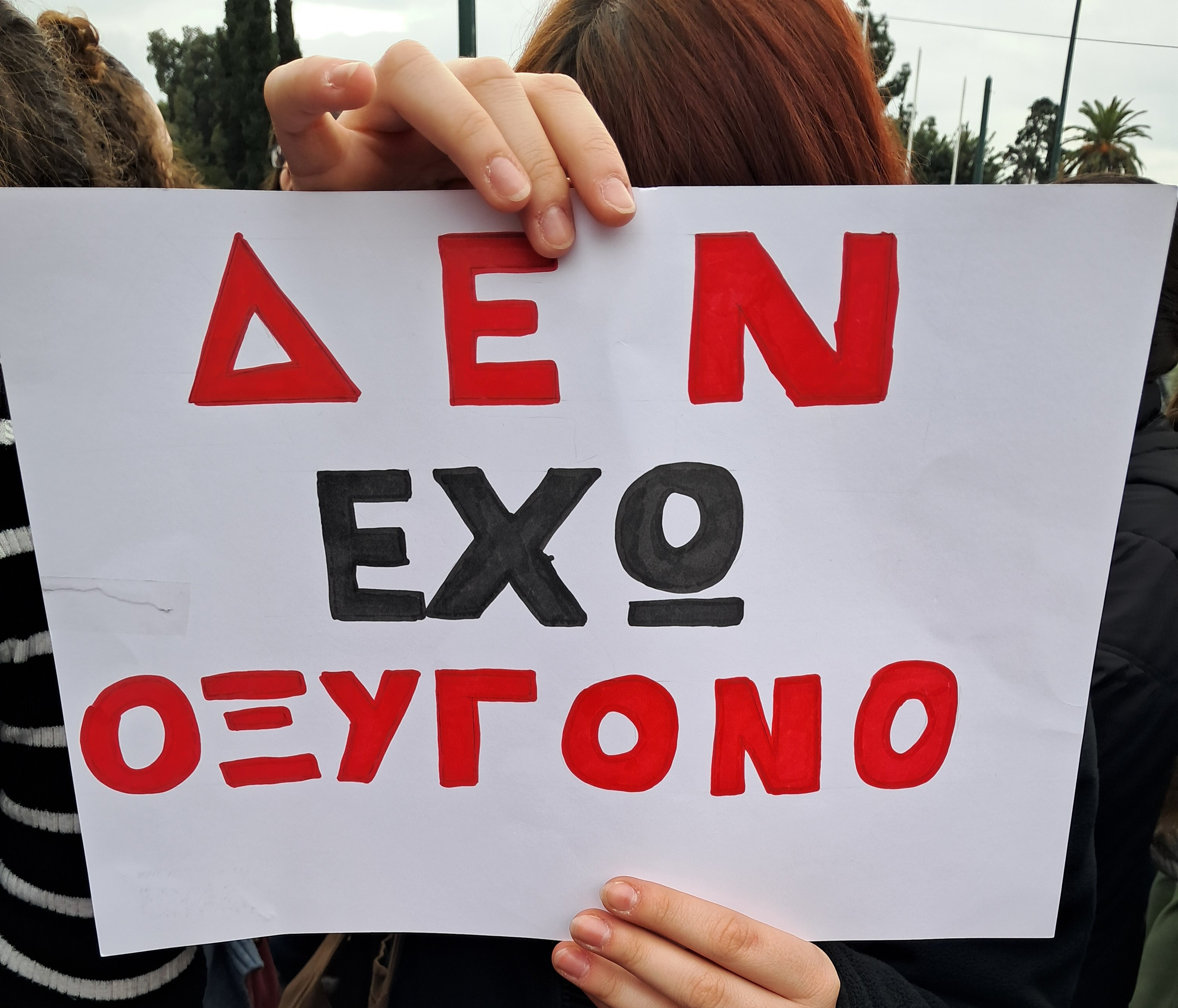
"I don't have oxygen", the central phrase of the 2025 massive protests in the second anniversary of the train crash.

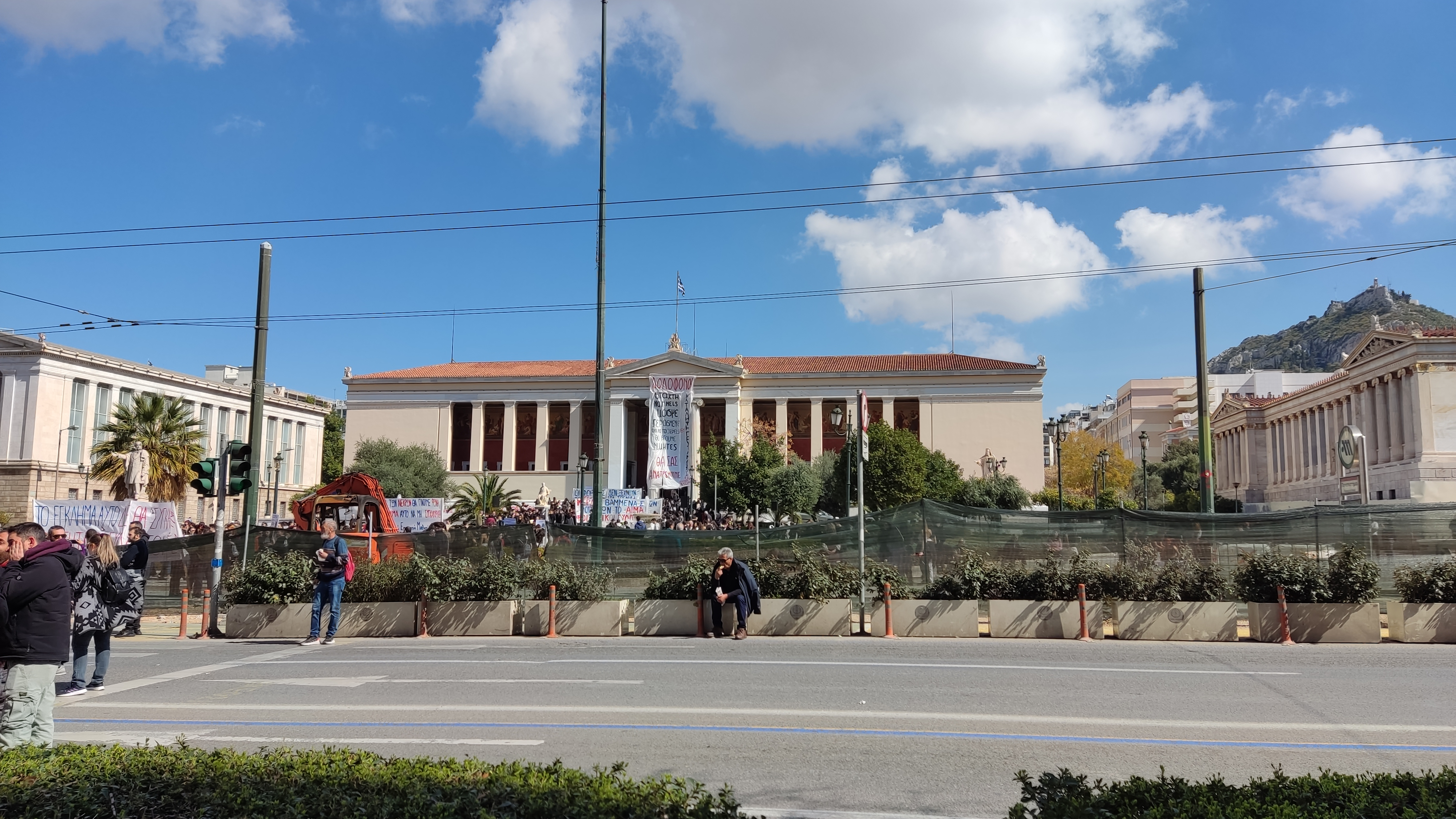
The central building of Athens University occupied by protesters during the 8 March 2023 national strike.

Following the train crash, the Greek government declared a three-day period of mourning, during which all flags were flown at half-mast, and celebratory events were postponed.

President Sakellaropoulou cut short her visit to Moldova "to support those who need it". EMAK (Hellenic special disaster management unit) were ordered to stop all operations on site to allow Katerina Sakellaropoulou to better understand the crash. She was witnessed throwing flowers inside the yet-to-be fully investigated burned-out carriages. Transport Minister Kostas Achilleas Karamanlis resigned after the train crash, stating at the crash site that it was his responsibility to do so "as a basic indication of respect for the memory of the people who died so unfairly", and that he had "failed to bring the railway system to 21st century standards". Later in the week, an official government statement clarified that Kostas Karamanlis had no intention of stepping down from his candidacy for the upcoming elections with New Democracy, which triggered protests in Karamanlis's electoral prefecture. Minister of State Giorgos Gerapetritis was appointed Transport Minister after the resignation of Karmanlis.

Vigils, heated protests, and riots took place in throughout Greece following the catastrophe, culminating in one of the largest protest movements (about 2,500,000 people) in Greek history, and the catchphrase "Πάρε με όταν φτάσεις," ("Call me when you arrive") became the main protest slogan. Millions of people participated in vigils, protests, or riots in response to the perceived lack of safety measures.

On 1 March 2023, the first protests broke out in Athens and Thessaloniki. At the end of the Athens protest, when the demonstrators reached the Hellenic Train headquarters, fights broke out, with the police using tear gas against the crowd.

Railway unions declared strikes in protest of Greece's government failing to modernize the rail system. In response to both the tragedy and growing dissatisfaction of the industry at large, the Panhellenic Union of Train Personnel walked out in protest of working conditions and the failure to modernize the rail network, starting their strike on 2 March 2023, despite the STASY metro workers' union suspending planned strike action on the Athens Metro out of respect for the victims the previous day. Scuffles broke out in Athens with police firing tear gas into crowds that gathered in front of the Hellenic Train's headquarters.

New protests were called in Athens and Thessaloniki on 2 and 3 March, with new clashes between the protesters and the police on 3 March. On 5 March, protests in several cities and towns of Greece occurred. The protest in Athens, with a participation of 10,000 people, had a confrontation with the police. Videos of the event depict police officers driving motorcycles into the crowd, hitting and using teargas against peaceful protestors. Solidarity protests occurred in other European cities, including Berlin and Copenhagen.

On 7 March, many schools in Thessaloniki were locked down by students, forcing the schools to move to online classes for a couple of days. In Athens, students left 57 empty chairs outside the ministry of transport in a symbol of the dead, many of whom were university students returning from the February academic break.

The Confederation of Greek Civil Servants' Trade Unions (ADEDY) called a 24-hour general strike for 8 March 2023. Coinciding with feminist demonstrations for the International Women's Day, large protests happened throughout Greece. In Thessaloniki, an estimated 60,000 people participated in the afternoon protest and 25,000 in the evening feminist march.

Several smaller scale protests in various neighborhoods of Athens, Thessaloniki and Patras took place on Saturday 11 March. New demonstrations occurred again on 12 March.

The General Confederation of Greek Workers (GSEE) called a 24-hour general strike on 16 March, which turned into a demonstration of 30,000 people in Athens and several smaller protests in other cities and towns. The protest in Athens, despite being peaceful, was attacked by the police. There were allegations of police brutality even against junior high school students.

== Investigation ==
Following the collision, police questioned two rail officials. One of them, Larissa's stationmaster, Vassilis Samaras, who had been working at this post for five consecutive nights and had apparently been alone while on shift, was detained and charged with causing death and injury through negligence. Stamatis Daskalopoulos, Larissa's public prosecutor, who was assigned by Supreme Court prosecutor Isidoros Dogiakos to handle the investigation, stated that while the investigation was still in its early stages, the authorities would continue to analyse all evidence and bring to justice those responsible. The Larissa railway station manager admitted to allowing the train through a red signal, but claimed that the set of points from the up line (northbound) to the down line (southbound) had not been working, further arguing that the passenger train should have stayed on the up line in order to avoid the freight train. It was later discovered that the stationmaster at Larissa had been informed that a freight train was on the southbound track around 17 minutes before the crash, and these entries were later discovered in a ledger.

The disaster occurred after years of multiple warnings from the train drivers' official union, while the current government was passing legislation that would make drivers' ability to strike or take industrial action for safety concerns unlawful. It also coincided with growing public demand for the approval by parliament of a Rail Accident Investigation Board (Greek: Επιτροπή Διερεύνησης Σιδηροδρομικών Ατυχημάτων και Συμβάντων, romanized: Epitropi Dierevnisis Sidirodromikon Atychimaton Kai Symvanton), an independent body tasked with investigating accidents causing death, serious injuries, or extensive damage on the Greek railway network. Such an institution is required under EU law, and Greece had been brought to court over it just two weeks before the crash. Three weeks before the crash, the rail workers' union had raised concerns over problems with the administration of the rail network which could put the passengers in danger.

On 16 May 2023, relatives of the victims filed a criminal lawsuit against Prime Minister Kyriakos Mitsotakis and other government ministers and officials.

In November 2023, nine months after the crash, the black box of the intercity train involved in the head-on collision was recovered. The recording device was discovered, according to Kathimerini, inside the wreckage of the carriages, which remain in storage at a Hellenic Railways depot, and was handed over to investigating authorities. It is hoped that the data can shed light on the final moments before the crash.

An article published by Politico on 26 January 2024 alleges that in a letter sent by EPPO prosecutor Popi Papandreou on 2 June 2023 to the Greek authorities, Papandreou indicated that the investigation into the crash had raised "suspicions ... regarding alleged criminal offences committed by former members of the Greek Government. These alleged criminal offenses regard breach of duty committed by the former Minister Christos Spirtzis and misappropriation committed by former Minister Konstantinos Karamanlis".

EPPO head Laura Codruța Kövesi remarked in 2024 that the accident "would never have happened if the projects had been implemented. But we are literally blocked in our investigations... And that's why we can't find out the truth. To do that, the Greek constitution would have to be changed."

=== Management of the accident by state agencies and government officials ===
The "Special Plan for Human Loss Management", first drafted and activated after the fires in Mati, Attica, which killed 104 people, and in particular its 4th updated edition, was the protocol according to which the management of the Tempi accident had to be designed. However, it remains unknown and controversial whether and how it was finally activated. Officially, the activation of the Plan is ordered by the Secretary General of Civil Protection at the request of the competent preliminary investigation authority, which in the case of Tempi was at that time the Larissa Traffic Police. However, according to the conclusion of the competent state authority, the activation of the "Special Plan" was proposed 3 hours after the accident by the Fire Service senior officer at the scene, at the meeting convened on the spot between all the senior officers of the services present.
Despite this request, there are no official documents proving its activation, which would be the case if the formal specifications of the "Special Plan for Human Loss Management" would have been strictly followed. Moreover, the oral testimonies of those responsible are tailored to their personal interests. (Note: A typical example is the disagreement between those responsible, i.e. the Deputy Minister for Climate Crisis and Civil Protection, Christos Triantaopoulos, and his immediate subordinate, the Secretary General of Civil Protection, Vassilis Papageorgiou, with the former claiming in a speech in Parliament that the plan had been activated and the latter denying it in his apologetic memorandum to the investigator.)

==== Errors and omissions ====
Τhe failure of the Police to set up a strict perimeter at the scene of the accident. The site was not guarded, and no record was kept of who was entering and leaving.
The accident site was degraded, with the result that no samples were taken, no careful recording of the debris, no traces or identifying evidence were recorded. The bodies were taken to the morgue without being numbered, identified or their location recorded. The search for traces of the victims was carried out by untrained volunteers and firemen, while the specialized team of the “Police Mass Disaster Victim Identification team” did not even visit the accident site. On 31 May, a private accident investigator accidentally found a forgotten human remains in the wreckage of the restaurant car by chance. The remains were matched to one of the 56 victims, but no further searches were made for other remains.
On the evening of 3 March, the search for remains was considered complete and the fire brigade left the site. However, the decision to end the search appears to be arbitrary, as it is not supported by any written order from the person responsible for ordering the end of an investigation, the Larissa investigator.
Immediately afterwards, the landscaping of the area began - a move whose legality is now being challenged in the Court of Justice. From 4 to 7 March, workers removed the engines and carriages of the train, moved the containers, platforms and metal sheets of the freight train, removed large quantities of soil that had supposedly been tested for human remains, repaired the tracks and restored the railway line, and laid gravel and a fine layer of tar on the site to make it accessible, as the district was said to want to build a chapel in memory of the victims.

=== Final conclusion of the expert on the side of the victims' relatives and demonstrations on 26 January 2025 ===
On 17 January 2025, the Association of Families of Victims of the Tempi Disaster submitted to the appellant investigator of Larissa, the conclusion of their technical expert, Vassilis Kokotsakis. The expert's final report revealed that the cause of the explosion following the fire that killed the last 30 people (Note: According to the HARSIA report, only 5–7 passengers died as a result of the explosion.) who survived the crash was the transportation of dangerous liquid chemical solvents that were not declared on the freight train's manifest.

The findings showed that the site of the accident was extensively disturbed, since, apart from the preparations necessary for the rescue operation and the debris, an area of about 2 hectares was covered over with gravel and concrete. The fact that the area where the wreckage of the passenger train fell was covered with thickly soaked quarry gravel and concrete almost ruled out the possibility of collecting materials (organic and inorganic) from the ground that could shed further light on the causes of the fatal explosion.

The expert also concluded that the "fireball" phenomenon that occurred after the collision of the two trains was not due to the ignition of silicone oils, as stated in the OSE's conclusion, but to the presence and ignition of liquid chemical solvents such as xylene and toluene, commonly used to adulterate gasoline, illegally carried on the freight train that contributed to the intensity of the fire and explosions. In support of this conclusion, an audio recording was released of two passengers' mobile phone calls to 112, giving the location of the collision to emergency services. The passengers can be heard complaining of a lack of oxygen in the atmosphere—saying, "I've got no oxygen"—which the victims' families argue confirms the claim that the presence of chemical solvents, namely aromatic hydrocarbons, was the cause of the deadly conflagration.

This audio file, which is part of the case file and has been in the possession of the victims' side since September 2024, appeared to contradict the official government view. Its reproduction on social networks has reinforced the Greek public perception since 2023 that the Mitsotakis government are trying to cover up the causes of the accident. A relative of the victims, Christos Konstantinidis, said "The system of the Mitsotakis government will not be changed by any party in parliament. Tempi will bring what is needed by showing that there was a conspiracy behind this story to hide the evidence and ultimately not show what the freight train really had, which shows all the rot that exists in the Greek state and in Greek society".

The disclosure of the tape led to mass demonstrations on 26 January 2025 in 110 cities across Greece and another 16 abroad. Tens of thousands of Greeks protested outside the parliament in Athens, demanding justice for the victims of the crash. Protesters held banners reading: "We won't forget," and "I have no oxygen." Another massive protest took place in Thessaloniki and several other demonstrations took place in other Greek cities and towns and in major European and American cities, including Amsterdam, Berlin, London and others. Clashes between protesters and police in Athens and Thessaloniki resulted in injuries and arrests. Despite ongoing judicial investigations, no one has yet been held accountable, leading to public frustration over the perceived neglect of the rail network and the slow pace of promised safety reforms. Regarding the television coverage of the protests by the public broadcaster ERT, employee representatives on the ERT board accused management of severely downplaying the events, citing evidence. The opposition demanded the resignation of ERT's administration, a request echoed by the Federation of Radio and Television Workers (POSPERT). ERT's administration denied the accusations, calling them "an unacceptable distortion of reality."

== Civil courts decisions ==
The first judicial decision relating to the Tempi accident was announced in February 2025. It is a decision by single-justice first instance court in Athens (Labour Disputes Chamber) and concerns the death of the ticket inspector of the passenger train. The court held both OSE and Hellenic Train responsible for the malfunctioning of the centralized traffic control and signalling system, which led to the death of the worker, and awarded the victim's family compensation of 800,000 euros.

== Reactions ==
The president of the train drivers' association, Kostas Genidounias, said that the electronic systems that warn drivers of danger had not been functional for some years. "Nothing works, everything is done manually. We are 'in manual mode' throughout the Athens–Thessaloniki network", he stated.

Former Greek finance minister Yanis Varoufakis blamed the crash on railway privatization, comparing it to the Ladbroke Grove rail crash which occurred in London in 1999. Critics blamed a lack of public investment during the deep financial crisis that spanned most of the previous decade for the rail disaster.

Flags outside the European Commission building in Brussels were lowered to half-mast the morning after the accident. Albania declared 5 March a national day of mourning with flags at half-mast in the country. Additionally, the Albanian Parliament observed a minute of silence.

On the first anniversary of the disaster on 28 February 2024, more than 30,000 people marched in Athens to commemorate the crash, while church bells across the country were rung 57 times to symbolize the number of fatalities.

On 26 March 2024, the opposition PASOK party, with the support of the Syriza party, filed a no-confidence motion in the Hellenic Parliament against the Mitsotakis government, saying that it tried to cover up its responsibility over the disaster. The motion came following the publication a report by the newspaper To Vima suggesting that audio transcripts of conversations between the station manager and the train driver leaked to the press following the disaster had been heavily edited to indicate human error in the crash. The motion was defeated in a 159–141 vote on 28 March.

On 6 February 2025, Christos Triantopoulos resigned as deputy minister for civil protection following allegations that he had tampered with evidence related to the crash.

=== Demonstrations and protests on the first anniversary of the accident ===
One year after the accident, on 28 February 2024, tens of thousands of people took part in strike rallies in Athens, Thessaloniki, and other cities in memory of the victims. Holding red balloons and banners, and with the dominant slogan "This crime will not be forgotten," citizens called for justice to be served immediately.

At the request of Maria Karystianou, president of the Association of Victims’ Relatives Tempi 2023, church bells in all dioceses of the Church of Greece tolled 57 times at 10 a.m.

On the same day, protesters and parents of lost children wrote the names of the 57 victims in red paint in front of the Monument of the Unknown Soldier. The names were erased that night by the Athens municipality, but they were rewritten the next day during a nationwide educational rally.

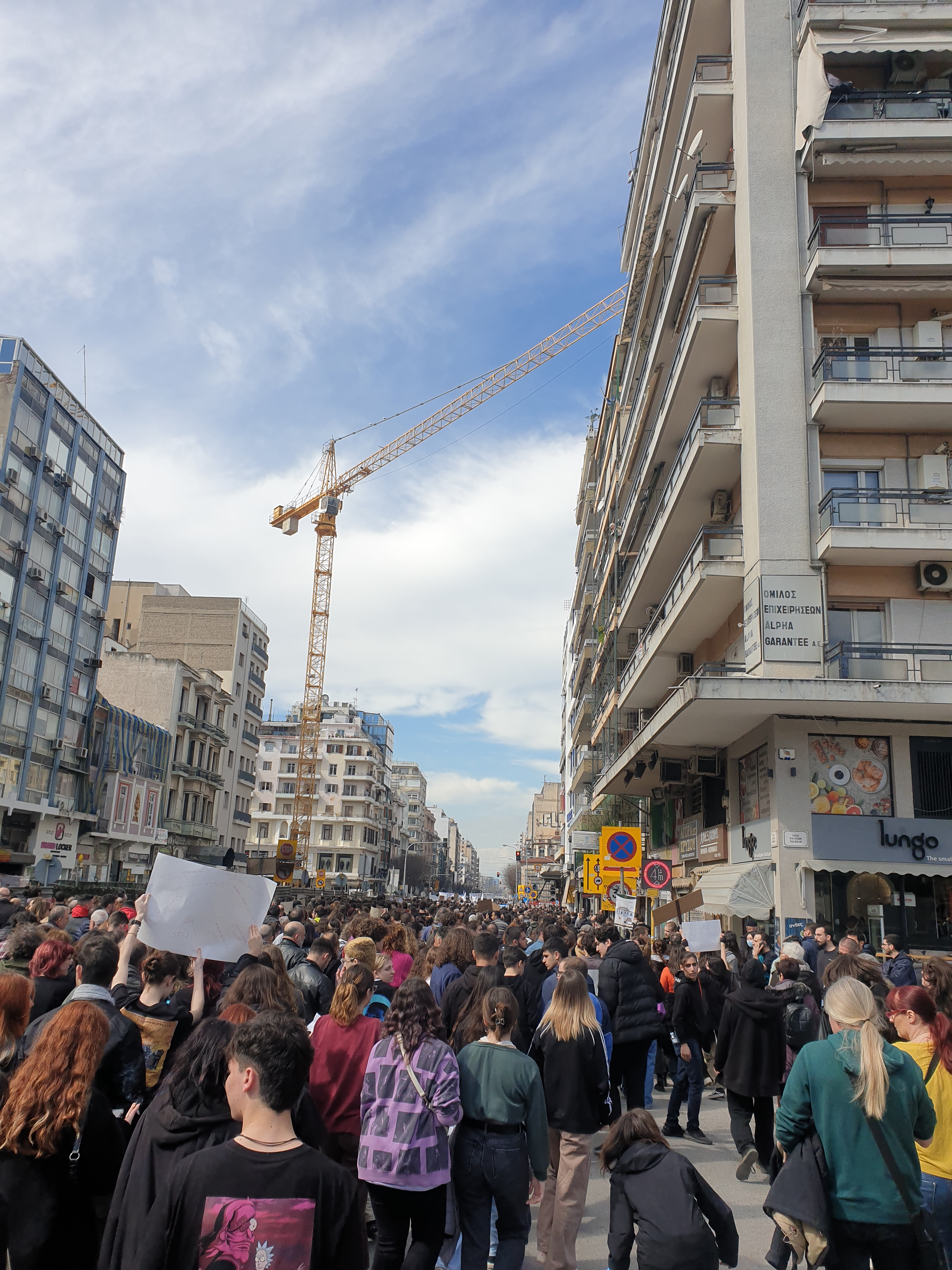
High school and university students marching in Egnatia street. Ahead, in the distance, the size of the crowd is visible (around 35,000 people).

=== Collection of signatures ===
One year after the crash, the Association of Relatives of the Victims of the 2023 Tempe railway disaster collected signatures through the online platform change.org, with the aim of abolishing legal immunity for ministers and commencing an inquiry concerning the involvement of ministers responsible for train safety, after a related revision of the Greek Constitution. Online signatures exceeded 1.3 million. However, article 73(6), which resulted from the 2019 Revision, is still inactive, as no implementing law has been adopted—at the time of signature collection—to define the rules for its application, and thus the signatures collected do not initiate the process of a popular legislative initiative, while it remains unclear whether collecting them via change.org would be considered valid.

=== Demonstrations and protests on the second anniversary of the accident ===
On 7 February 2025, student and teacher rallies took place in Athens, Thessaloniki, and many other cities, demanding justice for the Tempi tragedy, under the slogan "I have no more oxygen.”

On 28 February 2025, two years after the accident, hundreds of thousands of citizens, mostly young people, demonstrated in more than 262 cities and villages in Greece and abroad, calling for justice and denouncing any cover-up.

GSEE, ADEDY, and the overwhelming majority of local trade unions organized a nationwide 24-hour strike.

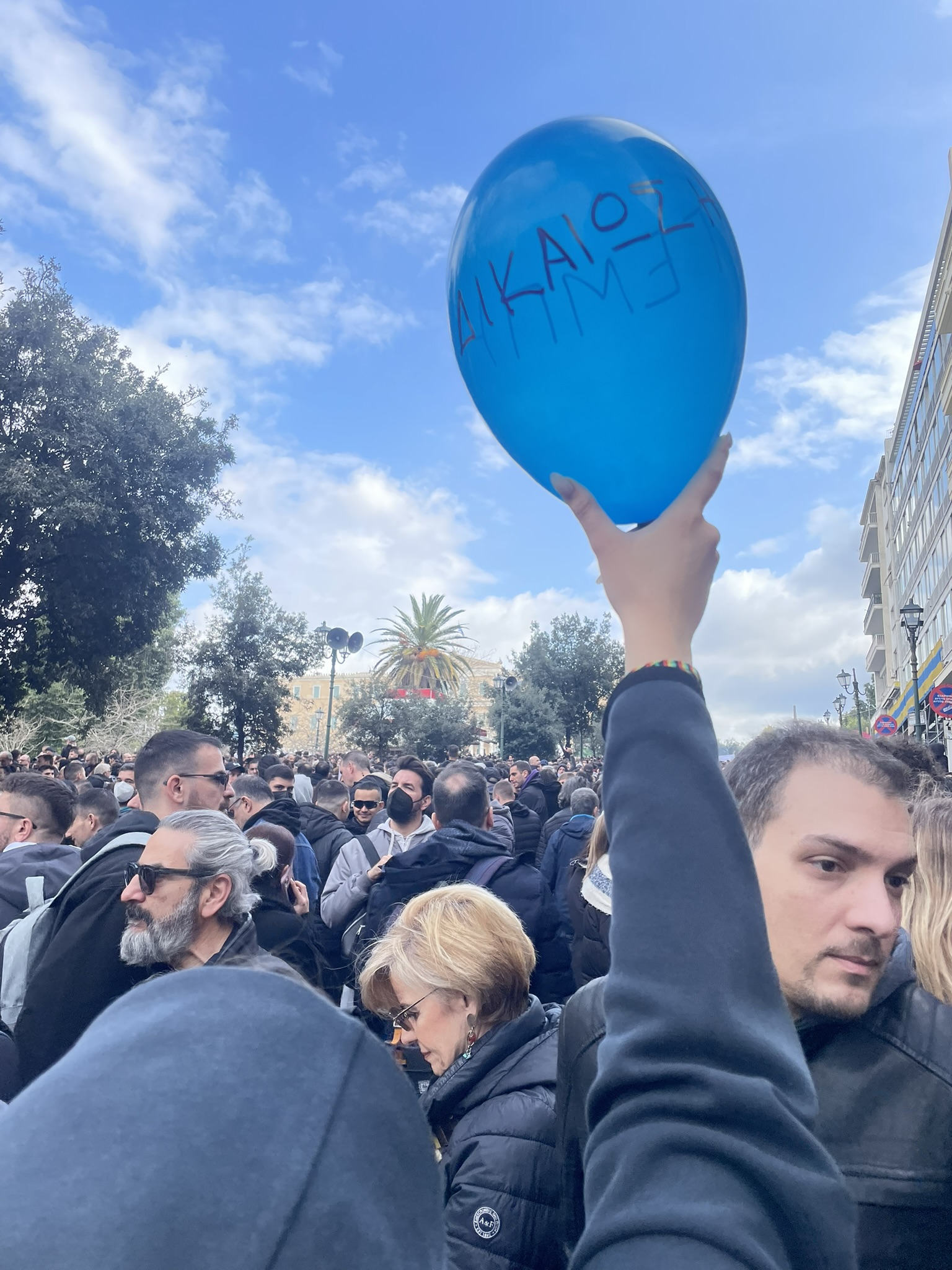
People gathered on Othonos street in Athens, facing the Greek Parliament, on February 28, 2025. In the picture, a person is holding a balloon wiriting ΤΕΜΠΗ ΔΙΚΑΙΟΣΥΝΗ - TEMPI JUSTICE

Maria Karystianou, president of the Tempi 2023 Victims’ Association, addressed "the murderers of our children," saying in her speech at Syntagma Square: "You insulted and treated our dead with contempt. The bodies and bones of our children remain buried in secret places. You have committed the ultimate hubris, and you will face Nemesis through the people’s pulse."

The rally in Athens was temporarily dispersed following violent clashes between the police and some hooded protesters outside the Parliament building. However, after tensions had subsided, most demonstrators returned to continue their otherwise peaceful assemblies.

It is estimated that more than a million people in Athens alone participated in the protests, and is now widely regarded as the largest civil unrest during the Metapolitefsi era (and probably in Greek history).

=== Vote of No Confidence ===
On 7 March 2025, the Hellenic Parliament held a no-confidence vote after a motion submitted by PASOK, SYRIZA, New Left, Course of Freedom and 9 independent MPs. The vote failed 157-136 and the government remained intact.

The opposition accused Prime Minister Kyriakos Mitsotakis' government of shirking responsibility over the crash, failing to fix critical issues in the railway, and covering up evidence that would help shed light into the causes of the disaster.

Prior to the vote, On 5 March, Mitsotakis spoke in the Hellenic Parliament and defended his government, and attacked the opposition for politicizing the tragedy and spreading misinformation against the government. Mitsotakis claimed that foreign and domestic factions were using 'bots' on social media to exploit the tragedy for political purposes and inflame social divisions. Hellenic Police announced an investigation into the bots.

During the vote, clashes broke out outside parliament, between hooded demonstrators who hurled petrol bombs at police that responded with teargas to disperse them. Greek police said 61 people had been detained.

== Criminal trial ==
A criminal trial of 36 defendants started in a specially built courtroom in the nearby city of Larissa on 23 March 2026, but was adjourned because of disturbances. The accused were rail company employees, including the station master who manually diverted the train onto the wrong track, and officials from the Ministry of Transport. The hearing resumed on 9 June 2026.

== In popular culture ==
=== Music ===
The tragedy had an important impact on art, with a concert being organised in order to fund the efforts of the parents of the ones affected, with singers Thanasis Papakostantinou, Sokratis Malamas, Foivos Delivorias and band Koinoi Thnitoi participating in this concert that took place in Kallimarmaro. Already songs such as "Stin Koilada ton Tempon"(In The Valley Of Tempi) of Thanasis Papakostantinou were used to represent the tragedy. In addition, Koinoi Thnitoi made two songs dedicated to the crash "Th'argiso apopse"(I will be late tonight) and "Tha Nikisoume"(We will Win). Before the Concert, Foivos Delivorias also made a song dedicated to the crash.

== See also ==
- List of rail accidents in Greece
- List of rail accidents (2020–present)
