= OSE Class 120 =

Class of Greek electric locomotives

OSE Class 120 (Siemens Hellas Sprinter)
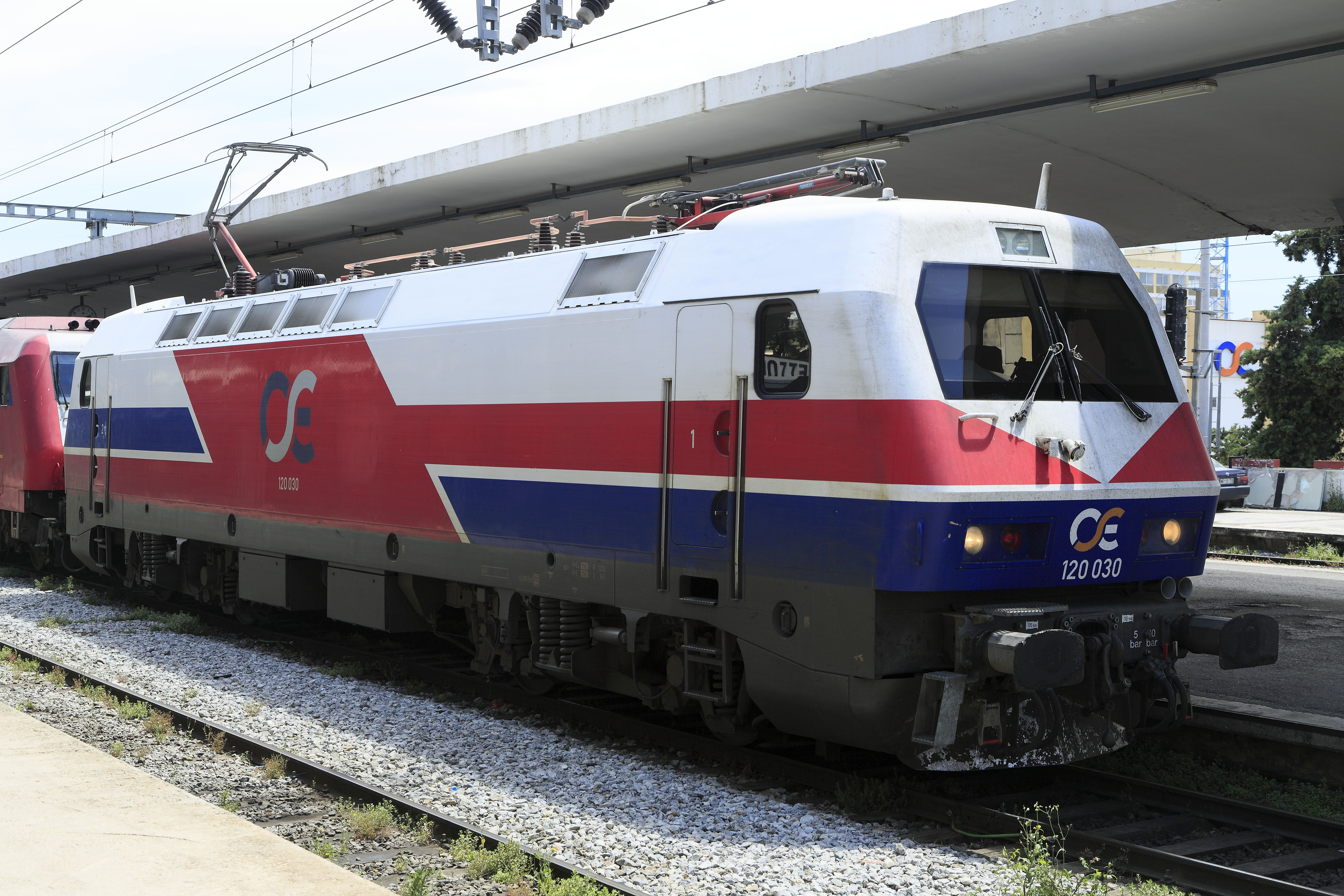
- 120 030 at Thessaloniki railway station, 22 May 2016
Type and origin
- Power type: Electric
- Builder: KraussMaffei -> Siemens Mobility; Munich-Allach
- Build date: 1997 (001-006); 2004-2005 (007-030)
- Total produced: 30
Specifications
- Configuration
  - UIC: Bo′Bo′
- Gauge: 1,435 mm (4 ft 8 1/2 in) standard gauge
- Wheel diameter: 1,250 mm (49.21 in)
- Length
  - Over couplers: 19,580 mm (64 ft 3 in)
- Width: 3 metres (9 ft 10 1/8 in)
- Loco weight: 80 t
- Electric system/s: 25 kV 50 Hz AC Catenary
- Current pickup: Pantograph
- Train brakes: Electrodynamic, Electropneumatic brake (Knorr-Bremse), Direct / Indirect Bremse
Performance figures
- Maximum speed: 200 km/h (125 mph)
- Power output: 5.066 MW (6,794 hp)
- Tractive effort: 320 kN (72,000 lbf) (at startup); 225 kN (51,000 lbf) with 80 km/h (50 mph) (continuous)
Career
- Operators: Hellenic Train, RailCargo Logistics Goldair (120 007)
- Numbers: 001-030
- Official name: Hellas Sprinter
- Delivered: 1998-2008

Hellenic Train Class 120, also known as Hellas Sprinter, is a class of electric locomotives operated by Hellenic Train. It is part of OSE's rolling stock. They were manufactured by Siemens and KraussMaffei in Germany.

They are equipped with electric motors with a total power of 5000 kW and have been used in both passenger and freight trains on the Greek railways since 1999. It was the first and is currently the only class of fully electric locomotives of the Hellenic Railway Network and the main locomotives used between Athens and Thessaloniki. There are two other types of electric trains in the National Rail Network of Greece, the Siemens Desiro EMU (460 series) and the ΕΤR 470 (in service since 2022).

== Origins ==
The HellasSprinter, strongly resembles the first generation EuroSprinter (and therefore is considered as such by many), a series of electric locomotives that also operated on the Deutsche Bahn, Renfe (Class 252) and CP (Class 5600) networks.

In 1993, with the proclamation 2002/93, the Hellenic Railways Organization (OSE) held a tender for the supply of thermal and electrical locomotives, in the general context of the modernization of the normal amplitude network, and in the middle of a program for the renewal of engines, due to operating problems of its diverse and aging fleet. The collection included 25 diesel-electric locomotives, which constituted the series A.471 (Later 220) and six electric locomotives. The diesel locomotives have a continuous power of 2100 kW, while the electric ones 5000 kW. OSE's goal was low maintenance costs, low fuel / electricity consumption, line protection, heating of passenger trains, execution of commercial and passenger trains at a speed of 160 km / h for diesels and 200 for the electrics and the convertibility of diesels to electrics. The winners of the competition were Siemens and KraussMaffei for the electrics and Henschel & Son for the diesels.

== In service ==
The construction of the first unit was completed in 1997 and as soon as it completed its trials in Germany, it came to Greece, to be routed on the electrified line Thessaloniki - Eidomeni - Gevgelija. Another 5 units followed, and along with CFR 060-EA1-056, an electric locomotive leased from Romania, they began their service in 1998 on the said route, primarily hauling cross-border traffic into North Macedonia. Their locale extended between 2009 and 2018 towards Larissa, Domokos and eventually Athens and Piraeus. A follow-up order was delivered between 2004 and 2005, save for 120 008 which for unexplained reasons had stayed in Munich at the Siemens-Krauss Maffei workshops up to 2007, before entering service in 2008.

In 2019, with the completion of the new Piraeus-Platy line and the units being used on all Athens-Thessaloniki trains, some locomotives were painted with the new dark blue livery of TRAINOSE. At the same time, in the same year, GAIAOSE announced the renovation of 120 001, 120 002, 120 003, 120 005, 120 006, 120 009, 120 013, 120 025 and 120 026.

=== Accidents ===
- Sometime in 2000, unit Η564 derailed in the Paionia municipality on the Thessaloniki-Gevgelija line. Not much is known about the details of the accident but since then the unit has been placed into storage due to light accident damage.
- On 28 February 2023, three units (120 022, 120 012, 120 023) were destroyed in a head-on collision near Evangelismos, Larissa just outside the Tempe Valley, in a train accident that led to the deaths of 57 people and left over 85 people injured. 120 023 was hauling an Athens to Thessaloniki InterCity train at a speed estimated to be around 140 km/h when it collided with 120 012 and 120 022 hauling an intermodal train.

== Fleet details ==
Key:	In service	In storage	Scrapped

List as per 20 July 2023, note it might contain some errors.

Original number	Works number	Builder	Year built	Depot allocation	Livery	Notes
Η561	20323	Krauss-Maffei, ABB	1997	Menemeni, Thessaloniki	Original OSE third logo variant	Current running number 120 001.
Η562	20324	Krauss-Maffei, ABB	1997	Menemeni, Thessaloniki	Original OSE third logo variant	Current running number 120 002.
Η563	20325	Krauss-Maffei, ABB	1997	Menemeni, Thessaloniki	Original OSE third logo variant	Current running number 120 003.
Η564	20326	Krauss-Maffei, ABB	1997	Menemeni, Thessaloniki	Original OSE first logo variant	Damaged in an accident at Paionia in 2000, has been in storage since. Due to this, it has no UIC running number and is on temporary bogies.
Η565	20327	Krauss-Maffei, ABB	1997	Menemeni, Thessaloniki	Original OSE third logo variant	Current running number 120 005.
Η566	20328	Krauss-Maffei, ABB	1997	Menemeni, Thessaloniki	Original OSE third logo variant	Current running number 120 006.
120 007	20645	Siemens Mobility	2004	Menemeni, Thessaloniki	Rail Cargo red	Currently leased to Rail Cargo Austria's local division, Rail Cargo Logistics - Goldair SA
120 008	20646	Siemens Mobility	2004	Menemeni, Thessaloniki	Original OSE Hellenic Train logo	Sat in storage from 2004 to 2007 in Germany before entering service in Greece the next year.
120 009	20647	Siemens Mobility	2004	Menemeni, Thessaloniki	Unknown	
120 010	20648	Siemens Mobility	2004	Menemeni, Thessaloniki	Unknown	
120 011	20649	Siemens Mobility	2004	Menemeni, Thessaloniki	Original OSE second logo variant	Placed on temporary bogies.
120 012	20650	Siemens Mobility	2004	Menemeni, Thessaloniki	New OSE (blue); Hellenic Train logo	Destroyed in the Tempi train disaster on 28 February 2023.
120 013	20651	Siemens Mobility	2004	Menemeni, Thessaloniki	Unknown	
120 014	20652	Siemens Mobility	2004	Menemeni, Thessaloniki	Original OSE Hellenic Train logo	
120 015	20653	Siemens Mobility	2004	Menemeni, Thessaloniki	Unknown	
120 016	20654	Siemens Mobility	2004	Menemeni, Thessaloniki	New OSE (blue); TrainOSE logo	
120 017	20655	Siemens Mobility	2004	Menemeni, Thessaloniki	Unknown	
120 018	20656	Siemens Mobility	2004	Menemeni, Thessaloniki	Unknown	
120 019	20657	Siemens Mobility	2004	Menemeni, Thessaloniki	Original OSE; Hellenic Train logo	
120 020	20658	Siemens Mobility	2004	Menemeni, Thessaloniki	New OSE (blue); TrainOSE logo	First locomotive to wear the new TrainOSE livery since May 2019
120 021	20659	Siemens Mobility	2004	Menemeni, Thessaloniki	New OSE (blue); TrainOSE logo	
120 022	20660	Siemens Mobility	2004	Menemeni, Thessaloniki	Original OSE; Hellenic Train logo	Destroyed in the Tempi train disaster on 28 February 2023.
120 023	20661	Siemens Mobility	2004	Menemeni, Thessaloniki	Unknown	Destroyed in the Tempi train disaster on 28 February 2023
120 024	20662	Siemens Mobility	2004	Menemeni, Thessaloniki	New OSE (blue) Hellenic Train logo	
120 025	20663	Siemens Mobility	2004	Menemeni, Thessaloniki	Unknown	
120 026	20664	Siemens Mobility	2004	Menemeni, Thessaloniki	Unknown	
120 027	20665	Siemens Mobility	2004	Menemeni, Thessaloniki	Unknown	
120 028	20666	Siemens Mobility	2004	Menemeni, Thessaloniki	New OSE (blue); Hellenic Train logo	
120 029	20667	Siemens Mobility	2004	Menemeni, Thessaloniki	New OSE (blue); Hellenic Train logo	
120 030	20668	Siemens Mobility	2005	Menemeni, Thessaloniki	New OSE (blue); Hellenic Train logo	

== Gallery of liveries ==
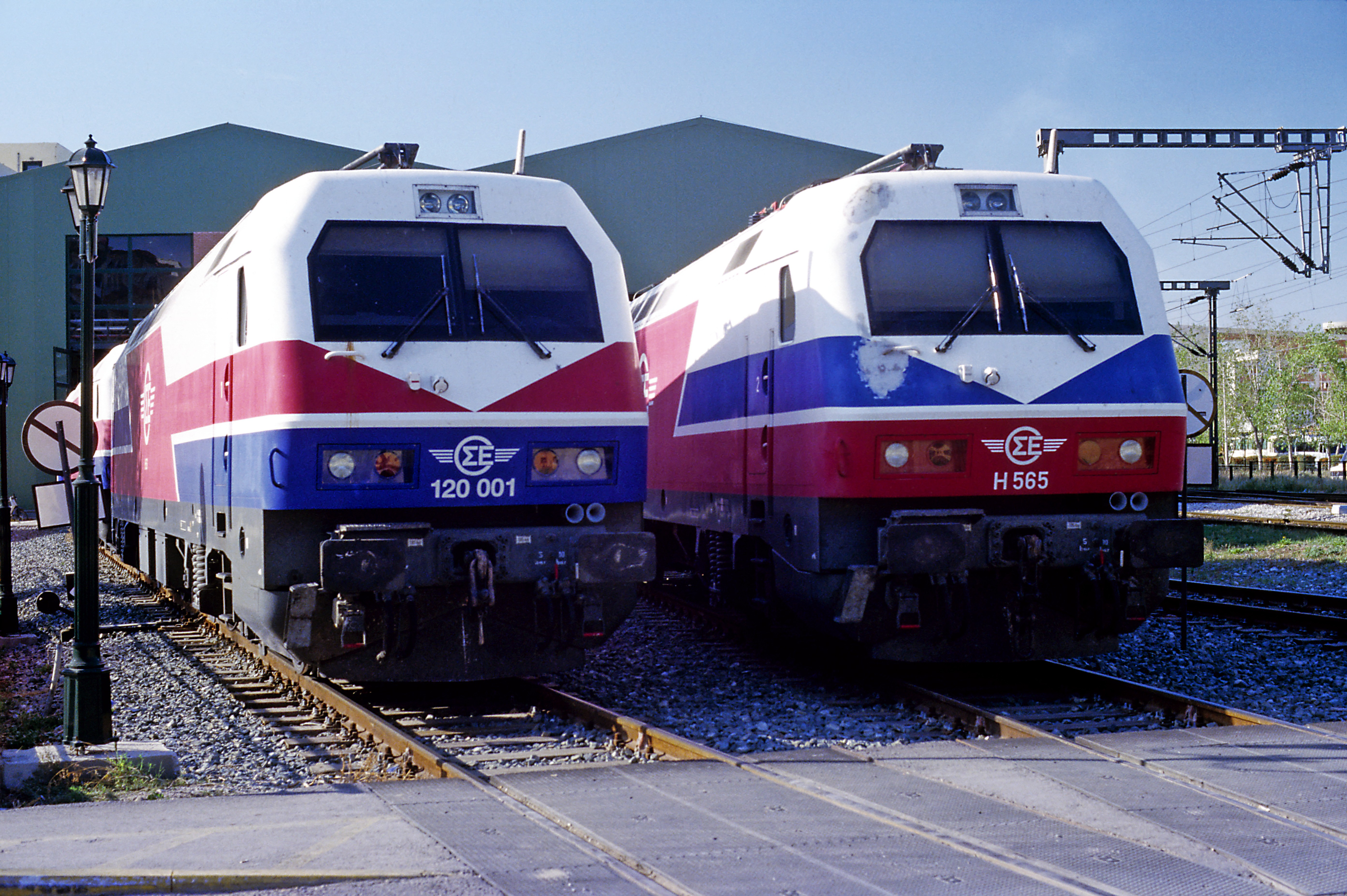
120 001 (left) and Η565 (right) with original and UIC-compliant running numbers, Menemeni Depot, 2005

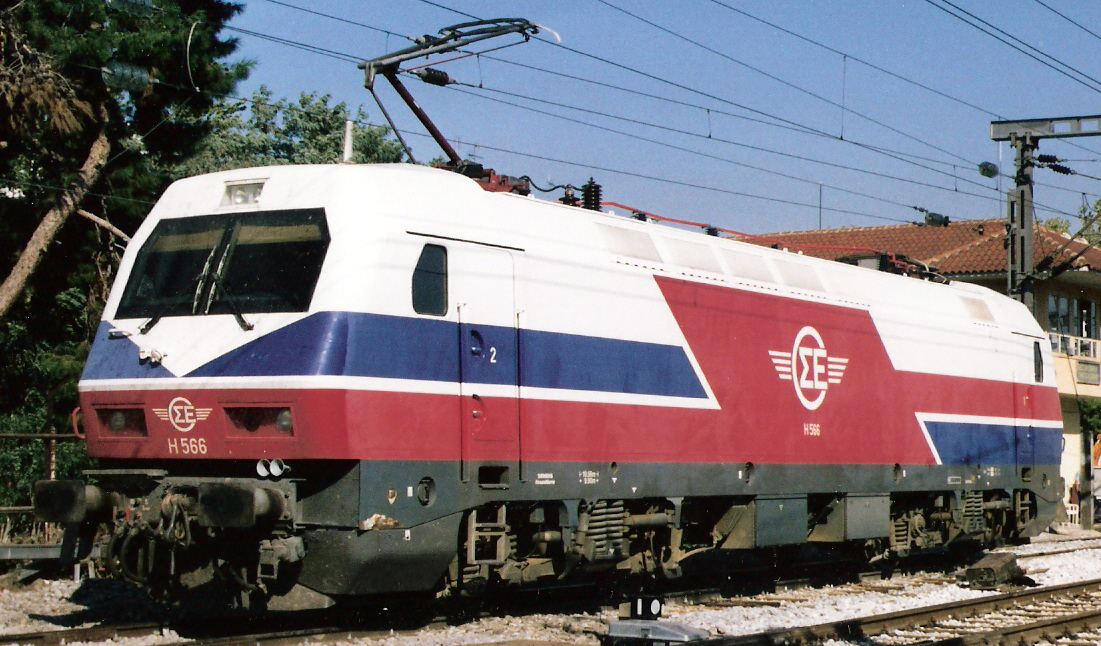
120 006 (then H566) with the original OSE livery, Thessaloniki, 2002

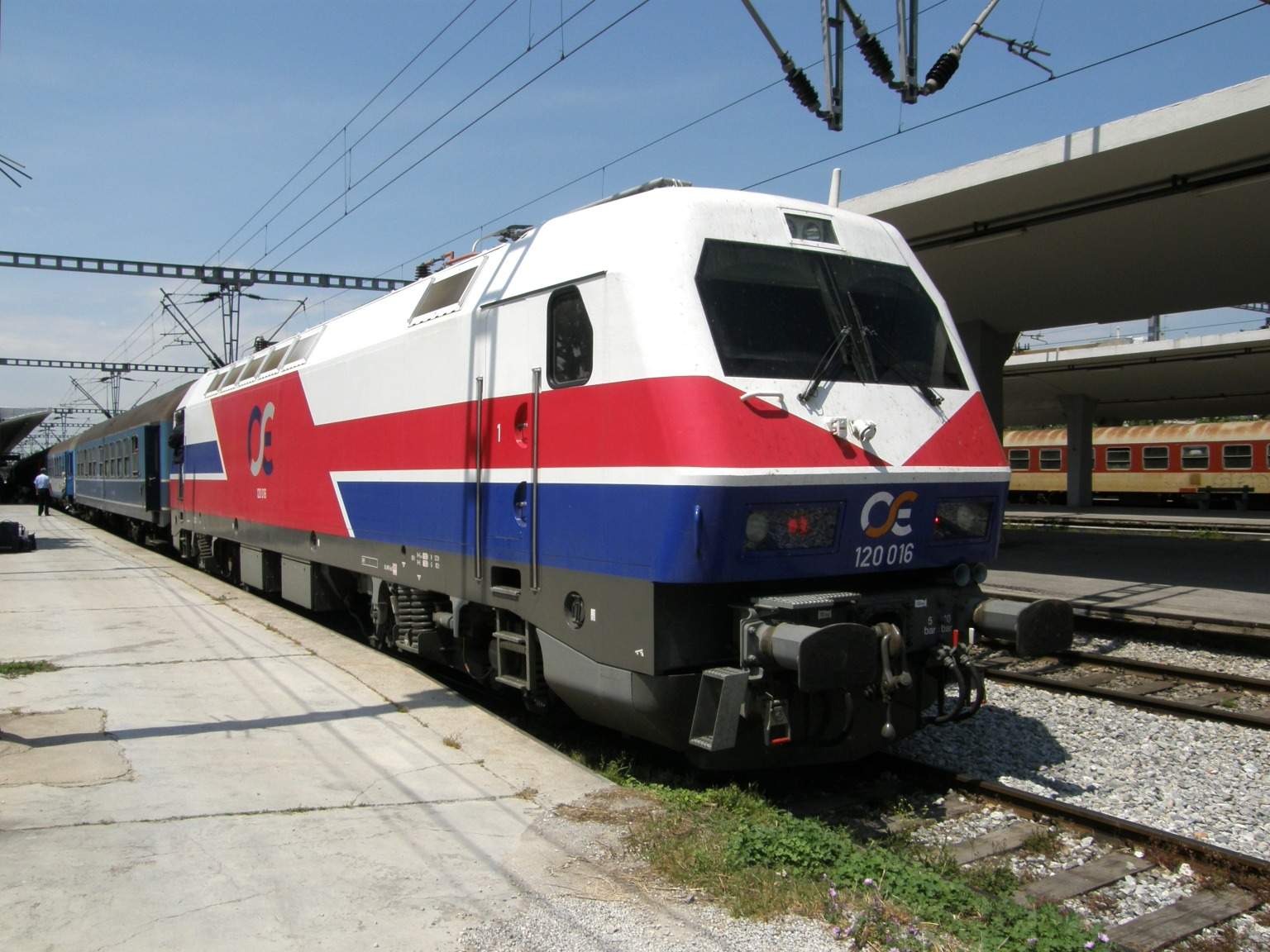
120 016 with the revised OSE livery (noticing two variations of the new OSE logo) having arrived with a train from Belgrade at Thessaloniki, 2008

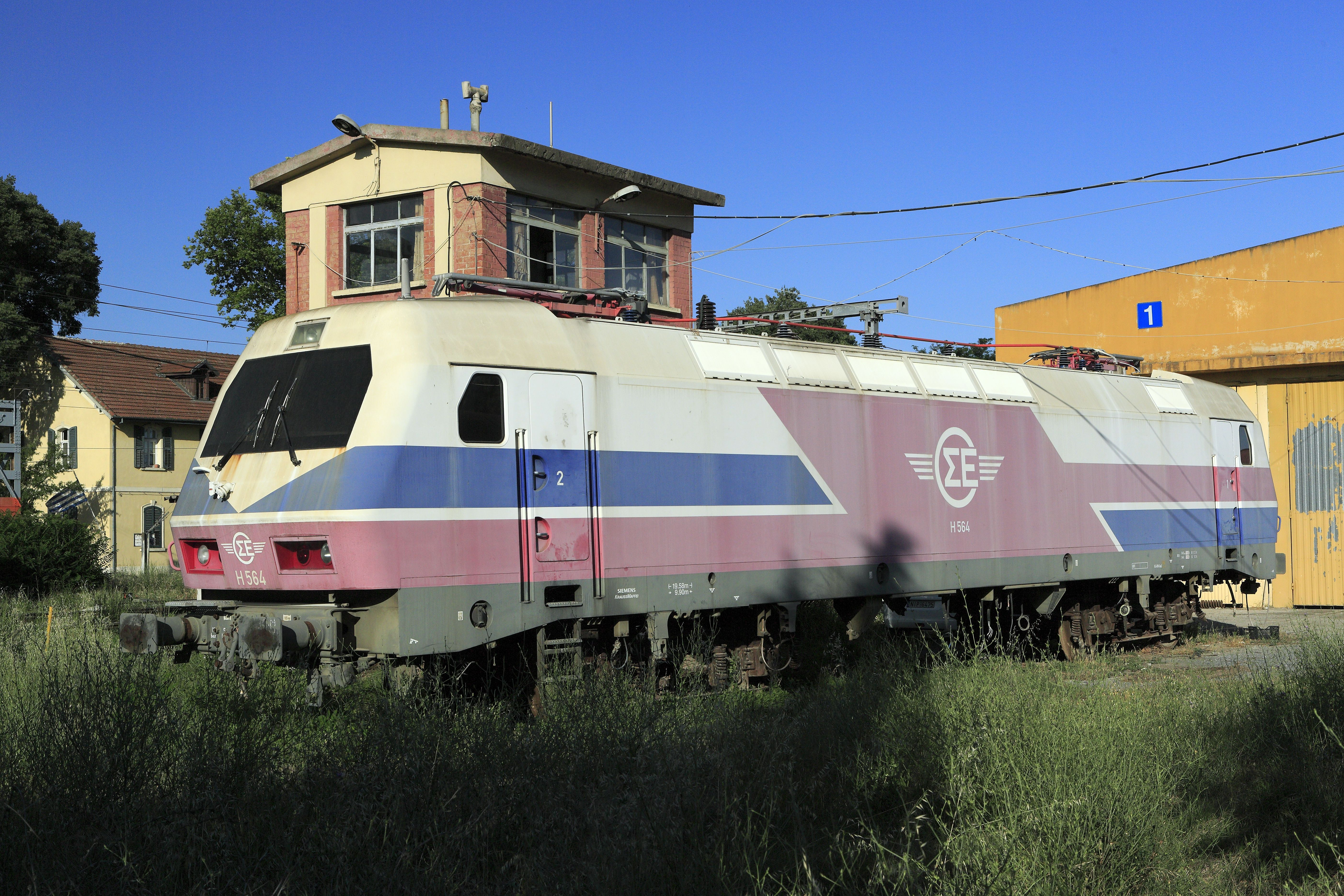
H564 placed in long term storage after the accident in Paionia, Menemeni, 2016

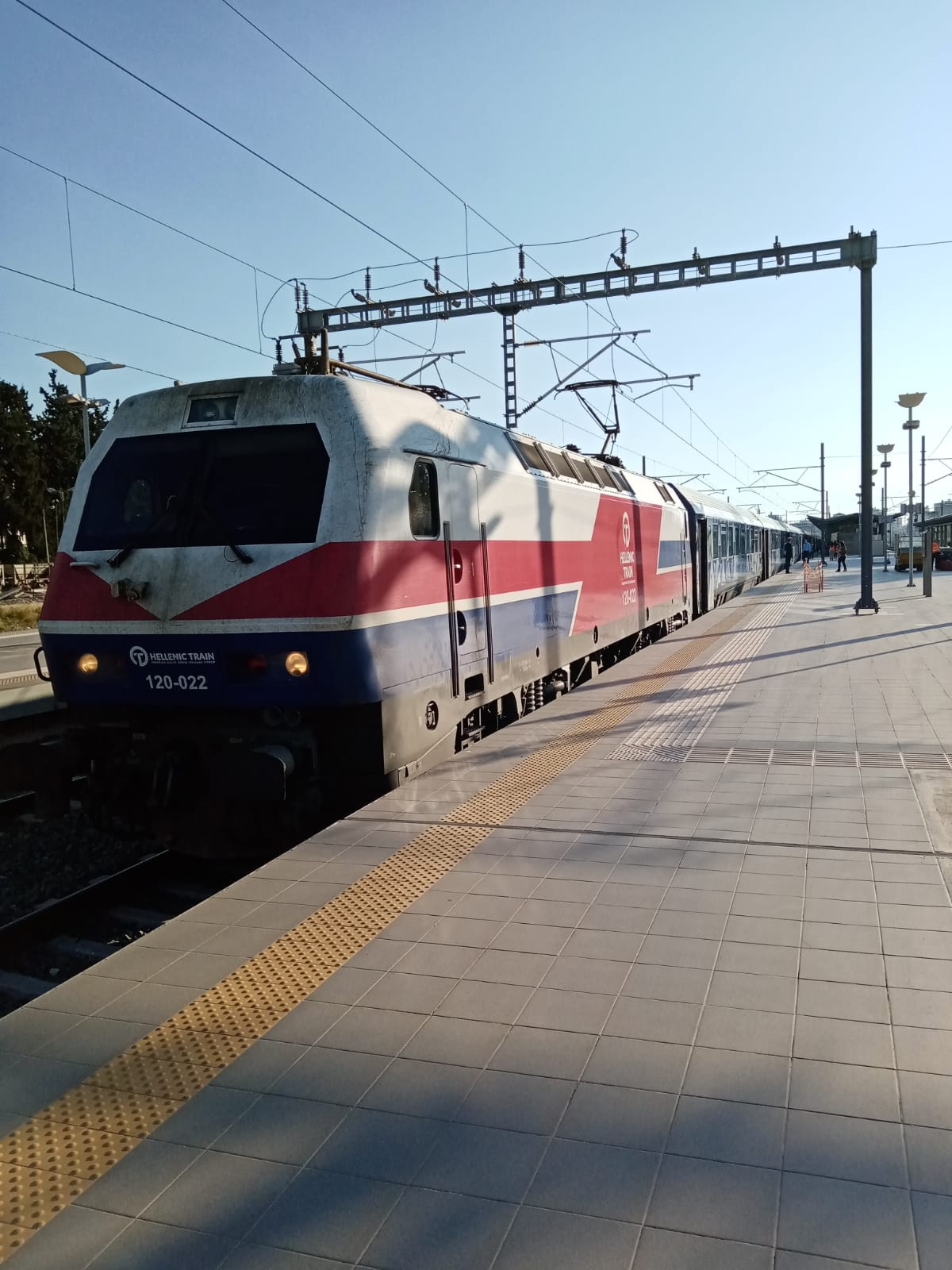
120 022 with the original livery and Hellenic Train logos at Athens station a few months prior to the accident at Tempi, 2023

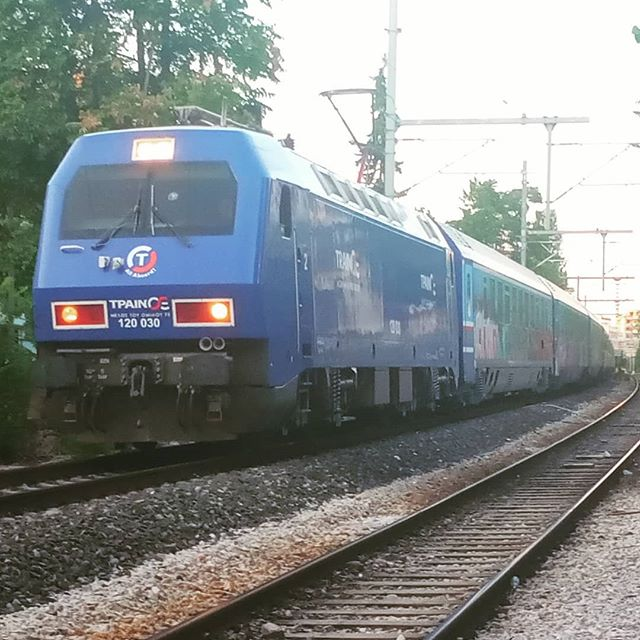
120 030 with the new TRAINOSE blue livery, 2020

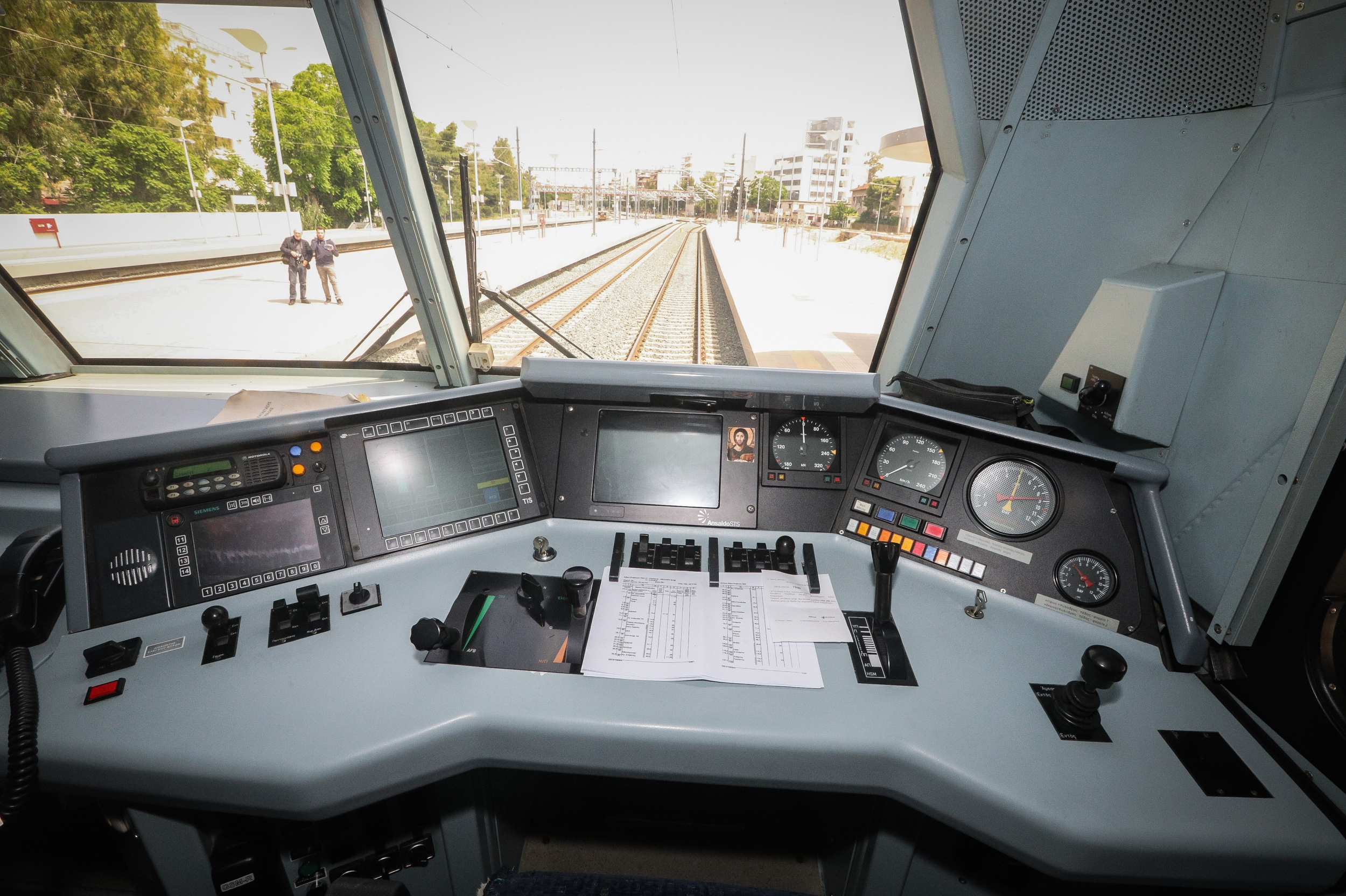
View of the drivers controls

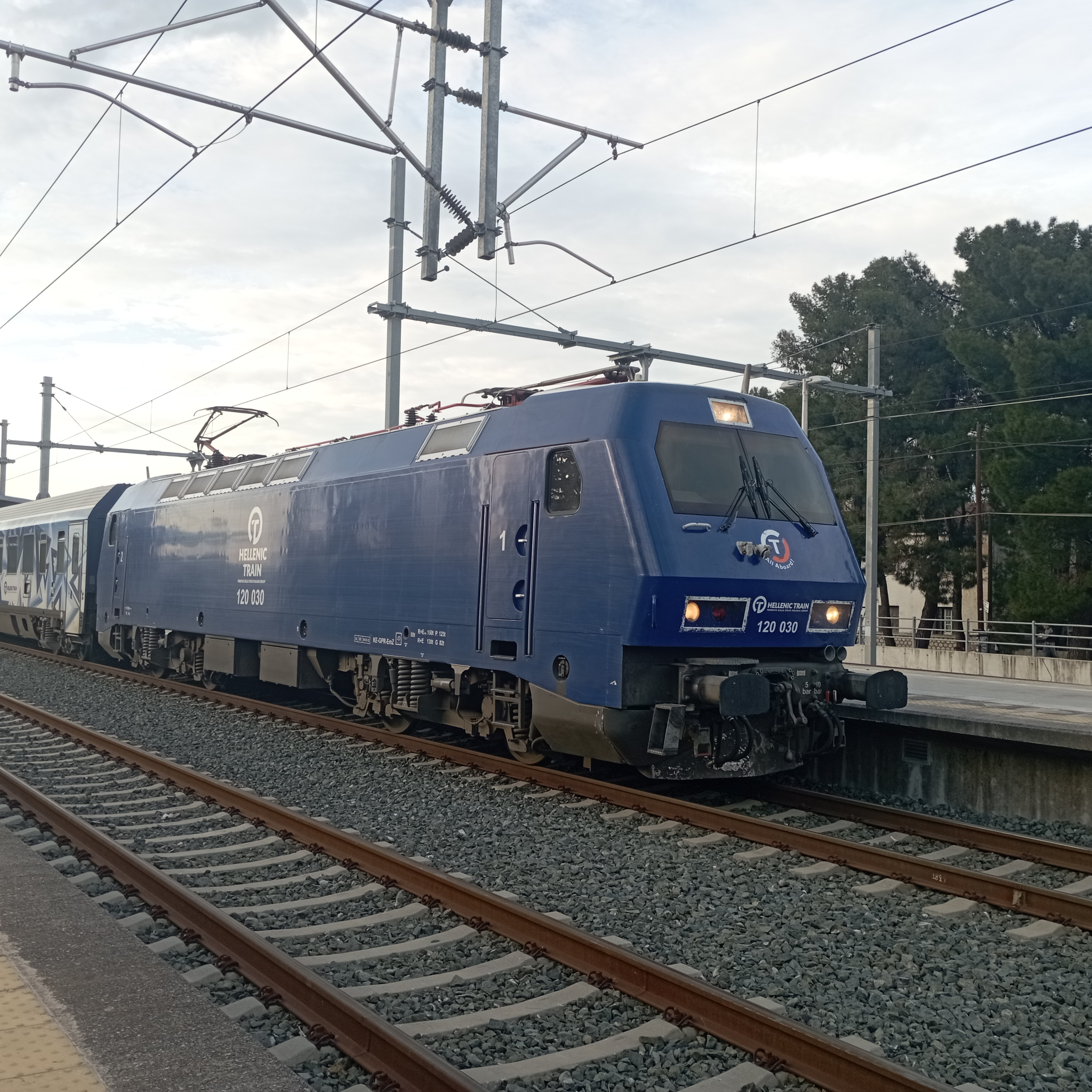
120 030 With the Hellenic Train Blue Livery at Tithorea Station. 2024

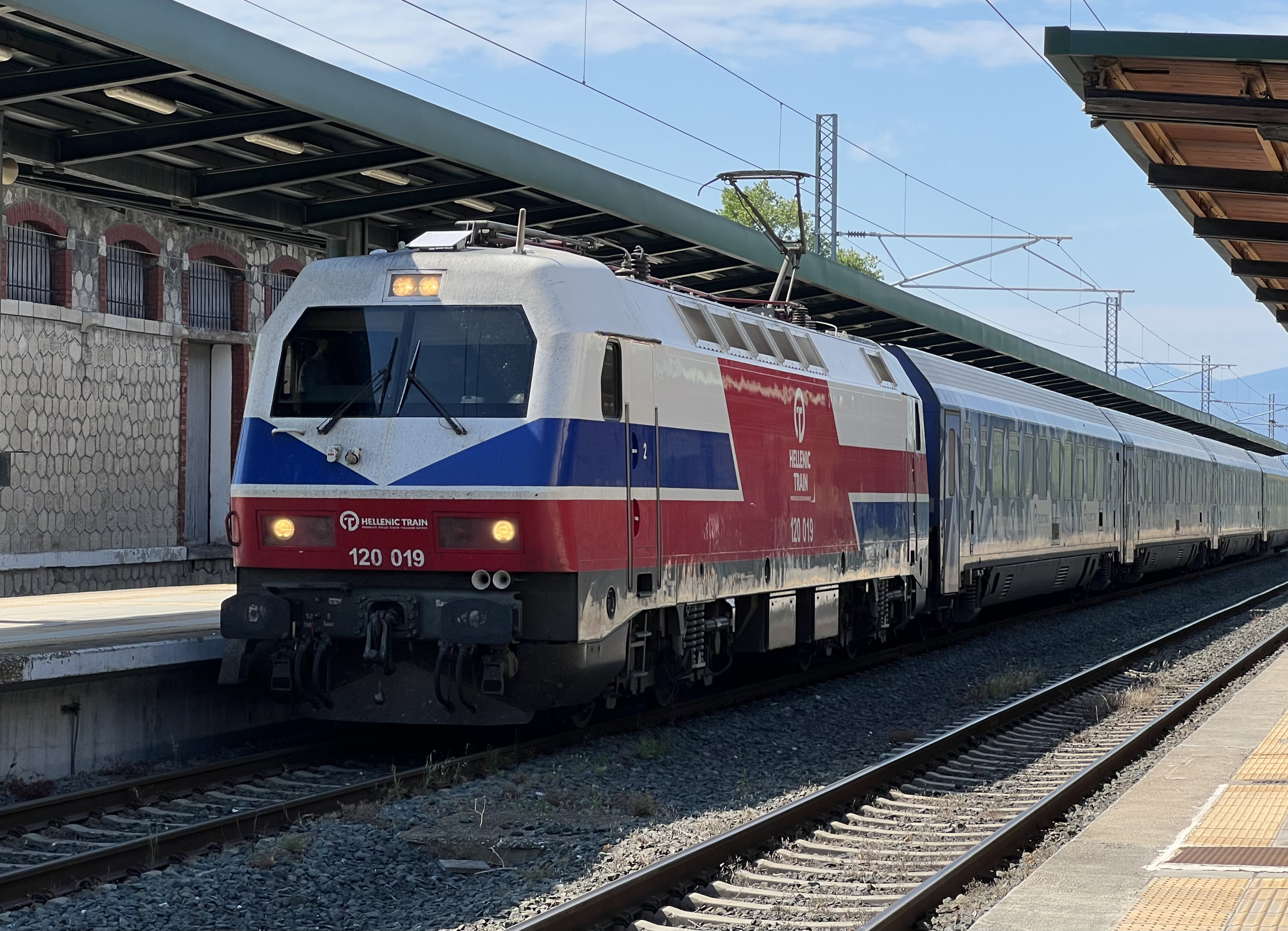
Hellas sprinter (120-019) at Katerini railway station. May 2026.

== See also ==
- EuroSprinter
- CP Class 5600 similar locomotives built at the same time for the Portuguese railways, operating only on 25 kV AC
- Renfe Class 252 Similar locomotives built from 1991-1996 for the Spanish Railways
