= Rena Asimakopoulou =

Greek judge (born 1946)

- Ρένα Ασημακοπούλου

President of the Supreme Civil and Criminal Court of Greece
- In office 12 July 2011 – 30 June 2013
- Preceded by: Georgios Kalamidas
- Succeeded by: Michail Theocharidis

Justice of the Supreme Civil and Criminal Court of Greece
- In office 2005–2013

Personal details
- Born: 1946 (age 79–80) Chatzis, Messenia, Greece
- Education: National and Kapodistrian University of Athens

Rena Asimakopoulou (Greek: Ρένα Ασημακοπούλου; born 1946) is a Greek judge. She was justice of the Supreme Civil and Criminal Court of Greece between 2005 and 2013 and served as its first woman president between 2011 and 2013.

== Career ==
Asimakopoulou was born in 1946 in the village of Chatzis in Messenia, Greece in a family of lawyers. She graduated from the National and Kapodistrian University of Athens.

She entered the judicial career in 1969. In 1972 she became an associate judge of the Athens Court of First Instance, a first instance judge in Messolonghi in 1974, and president of a court of first instance in 1985. She later became appeals judge in 1990 and President of the Court of Appeal.

She became justice of the Supreme Civil and Criminal Court of Greece in 2005 and its vicepresident in 2010. During her career on the Supreme Court, Asimakopoulou took independent positions in several high-profile cases. She opposed the remission of certain defendants in the DEKA and Cadastre cases, voted in favour of the contracted workers in the controversial 20/2007 ruling, and was the only full court judge to find the detention for debts to the State unconstitutional, a view later confirmed by the Special Supreme Court. She was also part of the court that convicted Georgios Koskotas and took part in rulings favourable to workers and social security bodies. Likewise, she dissented on two occasions from the decision to provisionally suspend the investigating judge in the Siemens Greek bribery scandal, considering that this measure was not appropriate.

On 12 July 2011 the Government of Greece appointed Asimakopoulou as the first woman president of the Supreme Court. Following her appointment, she stated that “judges should let their decisions speak for themselves”, declining interviews and statements to journalists, and she had previously stated that judges “are not gods”. She was considered a judge of integrity, independent, discreet, and rigorous, with a strong sense of justice and an austere view of the judicial role. Amid the Greek crisis and protests, Asimakopoulou had to deal with protests by judges and prosecutors over the pay cuts announced by the Greek government, whilst trying unsuccessfully to prevent the strikes that took place in late 2012 from spreading. She was succeeded by Michail Theocharidis on 30 June 2013.
