= Georgios Kalamidas =

Greek judge (1944–2022)

President of the Supreme Civil and Criminal Court of Greece
- In office 3 July 2009 – 30 June 2011
- Preceded by: Vasileios Nikopoulos
- Succeeded by: Rena Asimakopoulou

Personal details
- Born: 17 December 1944 Agrinio, Greece
- Died: 2 September 2022 (aged 77)
- Education: University of Athens
- Occupation: Judge

Georgios Kalamidas (Greek: Γεώργιος Καλαμίδας; 17 December 1944 – 2 September 2022) was a Greek judge. He served as president of the Supreme Civil and Criminal Court of Greece from 2009 to 2011.

Kalamidas died on 2 September 2022 at the age of 77.
