= Anastasia Papadopoulou (Greek judge) =

Greek judge (born 1959)

- Αναστασία Παπαδοπούλου

President of the Supreme Civil and Criminal Court of Greece
- Incumbent
- Assumed office 7 July 2025
- Preceded by: Ioanna Klapa-Christodoulea
- Succeeded by: Panagiotis Lymperopoulos

Justice of the Supreme Civil and Criminal Court of Greece
- In office 2021 – 30 June 2026

Personal details
- Born: 30 June 2026; 23 August 1959 (age 67) Xanthi, Greece
- Education: Aristotle University of Thessaloniki

Anastasia Papadopoulou (Greek: Αναστασία Παπαδοπούλου; born 23 August 1959) is a Greek judge. She has been justice of the Supreme Civil and Criminal Court of Greece between 2021 and 2026, and served as its president between 2025 and 2026.

== Career ==
Papadopoulou was born on 23 August 1959 in Xanthi, Western Thrace, Greece. She studied law at the Aristotle University of Thessaloniki Law School.

Her judicial career began on 26 May 1989 at the Thessaloniki Court of First Instance after obtaining her license to practice law. In 1991, she was appointed as a judge in the court of first instance and assigned to the Chalkidiki Court of First Instance and later returned to the Thessaloniki Court of First Instance. There, Papadopoulou served in a variety of roles and was a member of the Chambers of Public Law, Property Law, and Contract Law, as well as Criminal Law. In 2005, she was promoted to President of the Court of First Instance and served at the Court of First Instance in Drama, where she served as head of the court administration in addition to her judicial duties in civil and criminal matters. In 2010, Papadopoulou was promoted to judge on the Court of Appeals; at the Thessaloniki Court of Appeals, she served on the civil chambers for Public Law, Substantive Law, and Labor Law, as well as on a first-instance chamber. In 2020, she was promoted to presiding judge of the Court of Appeals and presided over a criminal chamber at the Piraeus Court of Appeals.

She became justice of the Supreme Civil and Criminal Court of Greece in 2021, and its vicepresident in 2024. On 4 July 2025, the Government of Greece, at the proposal of Minister of Justice, appointed Papadopoulou as the new president of the Supreme Court to succeed Ioanna Klapa-Christodoulea, who was expected to leave the office in June 2026 upon reaching retirement age. Papadopoulou was sworn in on 7 July 2025.

In addition to her judicial work, since 2022 Papadopoulou has directed the National School for Judicial Officials, where she spearheaded a comprehensive reform of judicial training, modernized its regulatory framework, promoted the training of judges, officials, and judicial police personnel, and organized selection processes and continuing education programs. She has also served as a professor at that institution since 2016.

She stepped down in June 2026 as she reached the retirment age and was succeeded as president of the Supreme Court by Panagiotis Lymperopoulos on 30 June 2026, who was her vice president.
