= Romylos Kedikoglou =

Romylos Kedikoglou is a former president of the Court of Cassation of Greece. He was born in 1940 in Heraklion in Crete. He is married and father of one child. He graduated from the Law Department of the National and Kapodistrian University of Athens with distinction.
