= Vasilios Kokkinos =

President of the Supreme Court of Greece from 1990 to 1996

Vasileios A. Kokkinos (1929 – 19 February 2019) was a Greek high-ranking judge who served as President of the Supreme Civil and Criminal Court of Greece (Areios Pagos) from 1990 to 1996.

== Life and career ==
He was born in 1929 in Atalanti. He studied at the Law School of the University of Athens and entered the judicial branch in 1956 through a competition. Previously, he served his military service in the Directorate of Naval Justice of the General Staff of the Navy from October 1952 to January 1956.

He was promoted in 1969 to the rank of President of the Court of First Instance, in 1973 to the rank of Appellate Judge, and in 1979 to the rank of Areopagite (Supreme Court Judge). His promotion from Appellate Judge to Areopagite was by absolute choice, meaning he did not first pass through the rank of President of the Court of Appeals. From 1977 to 1979, as an Appellate Judge, he served as Head of the Athens Court of First Instance.

In parallel with his judicial duties, from July 1974 to May 1975, he served as Mayor of the city of Nafplio, appointed by the government of national unity, following the fall of the junta in the summer of 1974 and until the first free municipal elections were held in April 1975.

In July 1990, the Cabinet of the government of Mitsotakis chose Kokkinos as President of the Supreme Court (Areios Pagos), bypassing all the vice-presidents and many Areopagites of the seniority list, a move that was considered unfortunate and unethical. Kokkinos remained President of the Supreme Court until 1996, and he was also President of the Special Court during the trial of the Bank of Crete case in 1991. Among his closest collaborators as President of the Supreme Court was Vice-President (and Head of Inspection) Sokratis Sokratidis, known for his conflicts with Andreas Papandreou since the 1960s and the ASPIDA affair.

In the Special Court, Kokkinos voted for the conviction of Andreas Papandreou on all three charges he faced, but Papandreou was ultimately acquitted on all three counts (one with a vote of 7-6). Kokkinos himself drafted the minority opinion that sought the conviction of the former Prime Minister. The majority opinion, which acquitted Andreas Papandreou, was drafted by Areopagites Prodromos Asimiadis and Vasileios Lampridis.

== Disputes ==
Kokkinos was known for his conflicts with PASOK MP and Minister Evangelos Yannopoulos. Their feud began in 1977-1979 when Kokkinos, as an Appellate Judge, was Head of the Athens Court of First Instance and Yannopoulos was President of the Athens Bar Association. The peak of their conflict came in 1991-1992 when Yannopoulos, through his television programs on Channel 29, harshly criticized Kokkinos' handling of the Special Court. In the period 1996-2000, the conflict continued, with the retired Kokkinos criticizing Yannopoulos' policies as Minister of Justice in newspaper articles. Yannopoulos responded with his own articles about Kokkinos' conduct in the field of Justice.

Besides Yannopoulos, Kokkinos had public disputes with his colleague, judge Stefanos Matthias, who succeeded him as President of the Supreme Court. In an article, Matthias argued that "it is unacceptable in the 21st century for Greek Justice to be under ecclesiastical guardianship" and criticized practices such as holding blessings at the beginning of the judicial year or involving priests in judicial body events. Kokkinos accused Matthias of being perjurious for these views.

He also took legal action against Spyros Karatzaféris for a series of articles in the newspapers Epikairoti and 48 Hours about him regarding his sexual orientation and alleged bribery. For these, Karatzaféris was sentenced on 31 July 1991, to 4 years and 10 months in prison with a suspended sentence for contempt of court, defamation, and forgery. On appeal, the sentence was not suspended, and thus Karatzaféris faced imprisonment. He eventually fled to Cyprus, where he hosted a daily radio show titled “Good Morning Mr. Kokkinos,” which aired in Greece on the radio station “Oh FM.” He returned to Greece when he was acquitted by the Areios Pagos.

== Death ==
Kokkinos died at the age of 90 on 19 February 2019.
