= Greek railway signalling =

The first railway signalling in Greece was installed on the Athens–Piraeus Railway at the turn of the 20th century, when semaphores and boards were added with the line's electrification. Other Greek trains at that time were controlled by signals given manually by station masters. During World War II, German occupation forces installed mechanically operated semaphore signals at the entrance to all stations, with some light signals at busy stations. Modern signalling is provided through colour light signals. Radio communication between train stations and drivers was introduced in 1973 and digital communication is an ongoing present-day introduction.

== Hellenic Railways (OSE) signalling ==
=== History ===
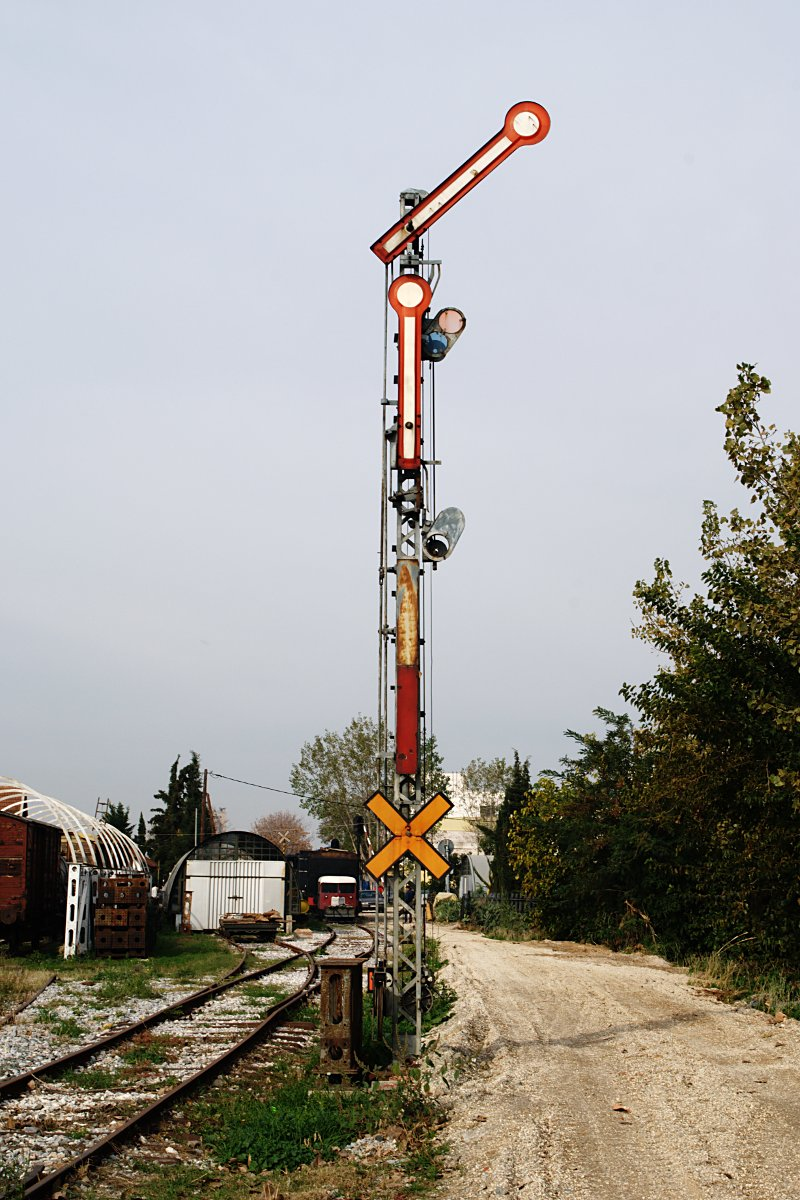
Old style semaphore main signal

On lines currently operated by the Hellenic Railways Organisation (OSE), signalling was not installed until World War II. There were few trains running and all traffic control was performed by the station masters (Greek: Σταθμάρχης). They controlled trains by hand signals and whistles and also delivered written orders to the train drivers for special operating procedures. Station managers were coordinated by morse-code landline telegraph and, later, by telephone.

The first semaphore signals were installed by the German military occupation forces during World War II and are almost identical to the "H/V" signalling system of the Deutsche Reichsbahn of the same period. Main signals consisted of two-arm semaphores and distant signals of yellow disks. These signals controlled the entrance to stations and were operated mechanically by wire from the station platform. Usually on each direction there was one semaphore controlling the entrance to the station, preceded by a distant signal. Some of them still survive, but they are no longer operational.

Local signalling using two-aspect colour light signals controlled by the station manager was installed at some busy stations like Athens/Larissis Station, Athens/Peloponnese station, Inoi junction etc.

All current aspects of railways signalling are described in the document "Γενικός Κανονισμός Κυκλοφορίας - Μέρος Α - Κανονισμός Σημάτων και Παραρτήματα I, II, III, IV, V & VI". This is a collection of different regulations, the main part covering semaphore signals and lineside signs, with appendices covering new signalling systems. It was issued in electronic format by Hellenic Railways Organisation in 2009. The contents of this document include:

- Main body: Traditional signs and signals, reflecting signalling and operating practices as they were around 1970.
- Appendix I: Colour light signalling in Thessaloniki Railway Complex (New Passenger Station and Shunting Yard).
- Appendix II: Colour light signalling system initially installed in Thessaloniki-Platy and Athens-Inoi sections.
- Appendix III: Current colour light signalling system and procedures.
- Appendix IV: Special local signalling systems in Edessa Station and at Kalamata Engine Shed junction.
- Appendix V: Level crossing signalling system (Greek: ΑΣΙΔ).
- Appendix VI: Recently introduced signs for electrified lines.

=== Semaphore signalling ===
Semaphore signals followed the German pattern and consisted only of home signals (German: Einfahrsignal) with the corresponding distant signals, covering the entrance to stations and are described in Chapter II of the Signalling Regulation. There were no starting semaphore signals (German: Ausfahrsignale), as the trains were signalled out by the Station Master in person, holding up a staff with a green disk and blowing his whistle. This practice was followed when colour light signals were first installed in the sections Athens–Inoi Junction and Thessaloniki–Platy, even though the new system included starting signals, but it was abandoned later, with the introduction of the current signalling system.

Signal	OSE Code	Meaning	Next signal	Notes
	11b	Stop	-	Stop immediately and wait outside the station
	11d	Proceed		Entrance to station free, unless it is restricted by other signals.
	11e	Slow		Proceed into station, entering a diverging line at a junction or the secondary line of a passing loop.
	20a	Caution	11b	Reduce speed to stop at the main signal.
	20b	Caution	11e	Reduce speed to proceed with low speed after main signal.
	20c	Clear	11d	Main signal is clear

=== Radio communications ===
Around 1973, as a result of a serious train accident that took place between Doxaras and Orfana stations in Thessaly, the OSE installed VHF/FM radios in all stations and driving cabs. In many cases the orders are transmitted over the radio by station masters, instead of being handed out in printed form. In the past OSE used ten different VHF frequencies. An allocation of 150.05 to 151.6 is reserved for the VHF/FM service. Today operations use four channels as follows:

Channel	Frequency (kHz)	Mode	Usage
1	150.290	Simplex	Peloponnese network and Ormenio–Thessaloniki–Amyntaio–Florina–Kozani
2	150.310	Simplex	Piraeus–Thessaloniki–Idomeni mainline
3	150.330	Simplex	Locomotive and train depots
4	150.350	Simplex	Reserve

The suburban section from Acharnai Railway Center to the Athens International Airport station uses commercial TETRA radio instead of VHF/FM.

Currently the VHF/FM system is being phased out and replaced with a digital communications network based on the GSM-R technology which shall also carry ETCS-Level 1 cab signalling. The GSM-R system was designed by an engineering consortium (DeConsult-Lahmeyer-TRADEMCO) and is implemented by Siemens. Frequency bands 876-880 MHz and 921-925 MHz have been specifically reserved for the GSM-R/ETCS service.

=== Modern signalling ===
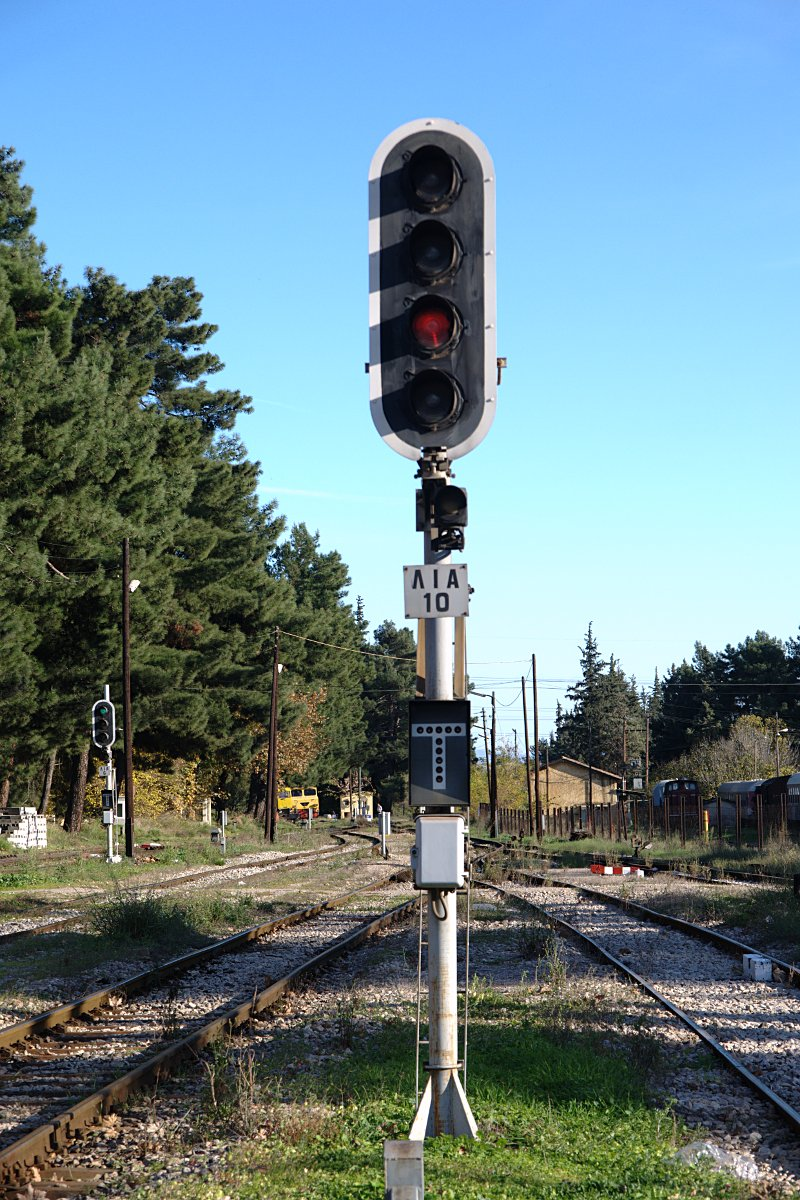
A four aspect colour light signal at Lianokládi

In recent years the OSE undertook modernisation of the section from Piraeus to Thessaloniki and Idomeni. This line uses block signalling with centralized control from a small number of signal boxes (Appendix III of Signalling Regulation). Signals are colour light signals with up to four lights and up to six possible aspects, which are described in the following table. Of course some signals have only three or two aspects when there is no need for all possible indications (for example if the signals are not followed by points). There are even a few single-light two-aspect signals, displaying either steady of flashing amber (ΦΠ-10 and ΦΠ-12). Currently the colour light signalling is functional on the following sections:

- Acharnai Railway Center to Inoi junction. (Appendix II, converted to Appendix III)
- Inoi junction to Tithorea (Appendix III)
- The single line mountain section from Tithorea to Domokos. It is the first section of the OSE network with full modern signalling and control from a central signal box located at Leianokladi (1982). (Appendix III)
- Domokos to Platy (signal box located at Larissa) (Appendix III)
- Platy to Thessaloniki, up to signal box TX1 (Appendix II, converted to Appendix III)
- Thessaloniki complex, controlled from five signal boxes (TX1 to TX5)
- Thessaloniki to Idomeni (Appendix III)
- Ano Liossia to Kiato (Appendix III)
- Acharnai Railway Center to Athens International Airport (Appendix III)

On the following sections the installation of signalling is at an advanced stage:

- Piraeus to Acharnai Railway Center, with the exception of Athens Central (Larissis) station.
- Inoi junction to Chalkis
- Acharnai Railway Center to Ano Liossia

Slightly different signalling systems were originally specified for the sections Athens–Inoi Junction and Platy–Thessaloniki; these are described in Appendix II of the Signalling Regulation.

Specialized local signalling systems exist at:

- Junction of Kalamata Engine Sheds (Appendix IV)
- Edessa station (Appendix IV)
- Thessaloniki Railway Complex (controlled from five signal boxes TX1-TX5)

The following table describes the modern (Appendix III) signalling system.

Signal	OSE Code	Meaning	Next signal	Notes
	ΦΠ 0	Stop	–	Signal must not be passed.
	ΦΠ 1	Proceed	ΦΠ 1 ΦΠ 10; ΦΠ 12	Proceed with maximum speed for section, unless it is restricted by other signals.
	ΦΠ 2	Slow	any except ΦΠ 0	Proceed with a maximum speed of 40 km/h from the signal to the exit of points area. Usually indicates that the train enters a diverging line at a junction or the secondary line of a passing loop.
	ΦΠ 10	Caution	ΦΠ 0	Reduce speed to stop at the next signal.
	ΦΠ 12	Caution	ΦΠ 2 ΦΠ 20	Reduce speed to proceed with low speed after next signal.
	ΦΠ 20	Slow. Stop at next signal	ΦΠ 0	Proceed with a maximum speed of 40 km/h from the signal to the exit of points area. Next colour light signal is red. Usually indicates that the train enters a passing loop while the starting signal at the other end of the loop displays a red aspect.

Signals are tagged with an identity which consists of a three- or four-letter code denoting the station and a number (for example "OIN 3"). Distant signals share the same number with the corresponding main signal with the addition of letter "A" in front of the number (for example "OIN A3").

=== Switch points ===
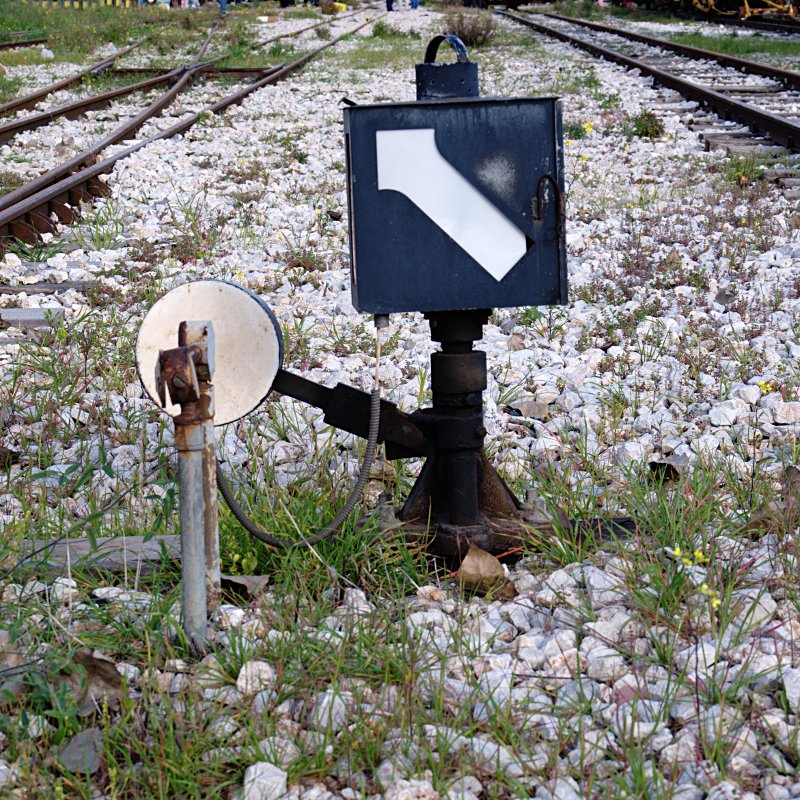
A points operation lever and indicator (Signal 31)

Most switch points, especially those located in stations and marshaling yards, are equipped with a position indicator (Signal 31), which is directly connected to the points operation mechanism. When the points are set to the through track, it displays an orange rectangle to the facing-point movements and a white rectangle to trailing-point movements. When the points are set to the diverging route, the indicator displays a diagonal arrow to the facing-point movements and a white disk to the trailing-point movements.

== Athens Metro signalling ==
Athens metro line 1 of Athens Metro signalling.

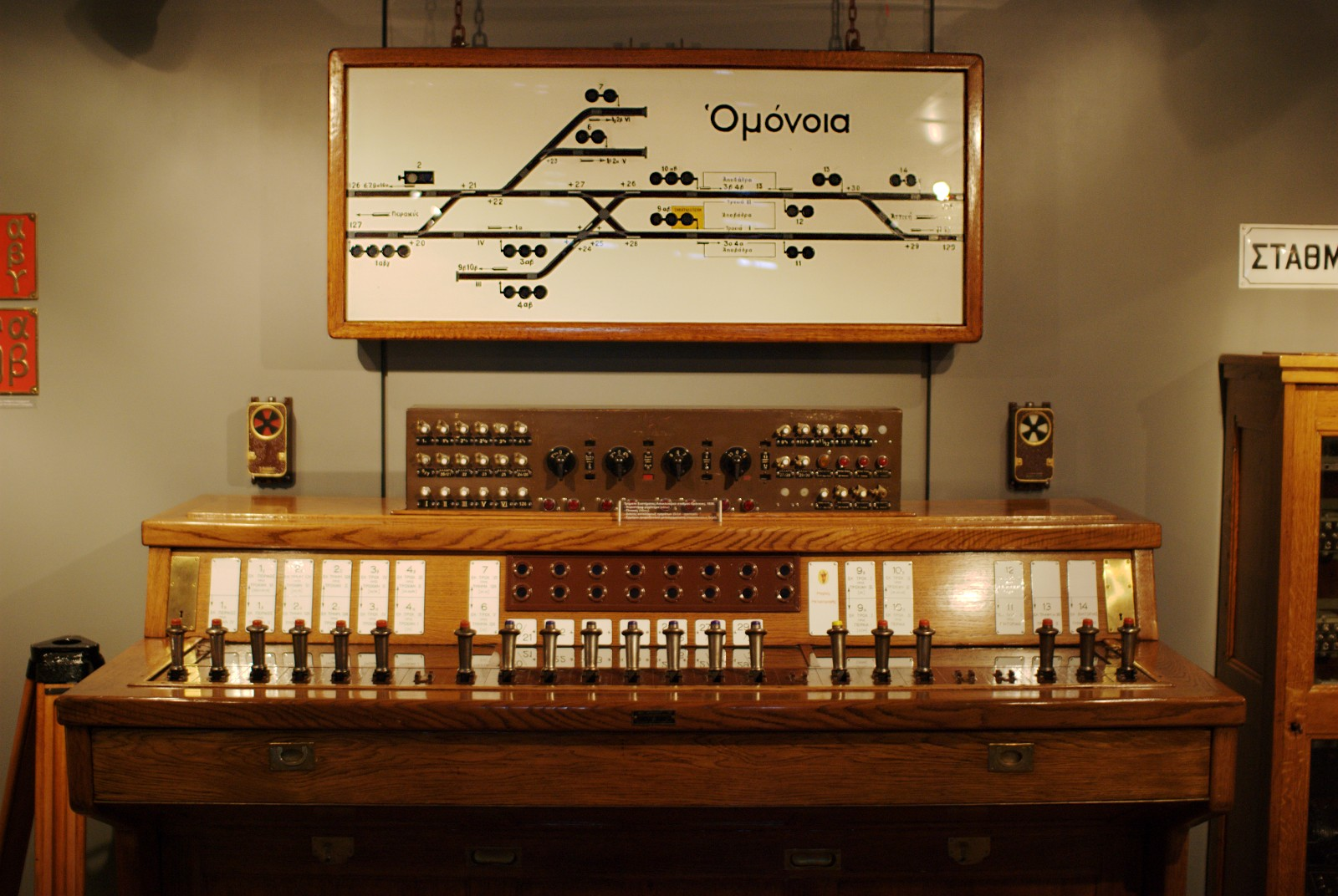
Operating console for signals and points used at Omónia station

Athens-Piraeus Railway Company, the predecessor of EIS (Hellenic Electric Railways) and ISAP, installed a signalling and points control system in 1900–1904, during the electrification of the line. The mechanical signalling system was designed by Siemens & Halske and used semaphores for the main signals and square boards for the distant signals. Most semaphores had one arm, whilst a small number, which were followed by points, had two arms.

The line between Piraeus and Omonoia Square was divided into six blocks. Details of the design and operation of the signals, the points, and the interlocking survive in Section D of the contract between the Greek Government and the railway company. The system became operational in 1904.

In 1924 the new company "Hellenic Electric Railways" signed a new contract with Siemens & Halske to renovate the signalling system. The semaphores were replaced with colour light signals and electrical interlocking. In the early 1950s colour light signalling was installed in the extension from Omonoia station to Kifissia station.

Most signals are "main signals" with two aspects (red and green). There are also a few two-aspect (yellow and green) distant signals, in locations where the main signal is not visible from a reasonable distance. If the points at a junction are set to a diverging route, this is indicated by a special "junction signal", a white diagonal line on black background. Junction signals are usually colocated with main signals, although there are quite a few stand-alone ones.

Main signals and junction signals are tagged with a number identity. Distant signals are tagged with the same number as the corresponding main signal, preceded by "Vs" (German: Vorsignal).

A new modernization programme began in 1982, still using mainly two-aspect colour light signals. Gradually the signalling system was adapted to central control from a power signal box next to Eirini metro station. The line circuits operate with audio frequency alternating current (Siemens FTGS 17). In 1983 ISAP installed an electromagnetic Indusi cab signalling system, which was supplemented after 2003 with an Automatic Train Protection (ATP) system. Full installation of ATP system is undergoing in line 1 as of 2021. In 2023 the fully installation of ATP in line 1 was completed and replaced the previous Indusi system.

Signal	Meaning	Next signal	Semaphore equivalent	Notes
	STOP			
	PROCEED			
	CAUTION	STOP		Displayed by a small number of distant signals at locations with poor visibility.
	PROCEED	PROCEED		When displayed by a distant signal.
				Junction signal. When illuminated indicates that points are set to a diverging route.

A VHF/FM simplex radio system, which operated on 161.325 and 161.375 MHz, was installed in stations and driving cabs in 1985. It was replaced with a UHF/FM repeater operating on 418.575 MHz in 2004. This system was supplemented with a TETRA system in 2004. However, radio is rarely used for train control under normal operating conditions.

Signalling on the lines 2 and 3 of Athens Metro is centered on an Automatic Train Protection (ATP) system, type LZB 700, compatible with the line 1 ATP system. An Automatic Train Operation (ATO) system has also been installed and is under evaluation. In the short section between Larissa station and Sepolia Depot an Indusi system was installed initially, so that the section could be used by ISAP trains, but this was later removed. The network is controlled by operators stationed in a central signal box located at Syntagma station.

Points are protected by two-aspect color light signals, designated as "switch point indicators". Initially these signals display either a white or a red light. Recently the white aspect was replaced with a green aspect.

STOP	GO

Signals are tagged with an identity which consists of a three-letter code denoting the station and a number (for example "ΣΥΝ 11").

Initially, stations and driving cabs were equipped with UHF/FM radios operating on 8 simplex channels between 418.6 and 418.775 MHz, but these were replaced with TETRA radios in 2004.

== Athens Tram signalling ==
At level crossings Athens Tram uses special light signals which are coordinated with road traffic lights. The signals are quite different from regular rail signals, in order to avoid confusion with adjacent road traffic lights. At some locations green wave signalling has been established, giving priority to approaching trams over road vehicles.

STOP	CAUTION	GO

All Athens Tram driving cabs are equipped with GPS receivers and TETRA radio telephones.
