= Supreme Civil and Criminal Court of Greece =

Greek supreme court

Coordinates: 37.9895°N 23.7533°E

- Άρειος Πάγος
- Logo of the Supreme Civil and Criminal Court
- Established: 1834
- Jurisdiction: Greece
- Location: Athens
- Website: www.areiospagos.gr

President
- Currently: Panagiotis Lymperopoulos
- Since: 30 June 2026

The Supreme Civil and Criminal Court of Greece (Greek: Άρειος Πάγος, Areios Pagos, "Areopagus") is the supreme court of Greece for civil and criminal law. In Greece, the decisions of the Supreme Court are final. However, since Greece is a member state of the Council of Europe, cases ruled on by the Greek high court can be appealed to the European Court of Human Rights. If the Supreme Court decides that a lower court violated the law or principles of legal process, it can order the rehearing of a case by the lower court. The court consists of the president and the attorney-general, ten vice-presidents, sixty five areopagites and seventeen deputy attorneys-general. The members of the Supreme Court are tenured until they reach the mandatory retirement age of 67, as mandated by the Greek constitution.

== History ==
The Areios Pagos is named after the first court of androfonies (crimes of murder), founded between 1500-1300 BC by Theseus and King Cecrops, which was situated on the rocky hill named after the god Ares in Athens. This highest court of antiquity was named the Areios Pagos Parliament and consisted of members for life, the Areopagites. In 462 BC a great part of the administrative and judicial powers was conveyed to the Heliaia, the 'Parliament' and the Ekklesia (public assembly). The institution was copied in many Greek city-states, and survived until well into the late Roman period, when the cities' internal autonomy was curtailed.

On 16 October 1834, the Areios Pagos was founded as the supreme court of independent Greece by royal decree. Instead of receiving the name Court of Cassation, it was named after its ancient equivalent. The first supreme court justices were nominated on 13 January 1835 by royal decree. The first president of the supreme court was Christodoulos Klonaris (1788-1849), attorney at law in the city of Nafplion and the minister of justice in the government of Ioannis Kapodistrias. The first attorney-general was Andronikos Paekos, who until then was the presiding judge of the temporary court of Missolonghi.

Among the areopagites there was also Anastasios Polyzoidis, until then presiding judge of the temporary court of Nafplion, famous for his refusal, along with fellow judge Georgios Tertsetis, to sign the conviction of the hero of the Greek Revolution, Theodoros Kolokotronis.

The first case of the Supreme Court (1/1835) was heard on 30 April 1835 and the decision was published on 1 May 1835.

The Supreme Civil and Criminal Court of Greece is currently housed in the courthouse of Alexandras Avenue built by renowned architect Iason Rizos (Ιάσων Ρίζος) on 23 February 1981.

== List of presidents ==
- Christos Klonaris (1835–1847)
- Yannis Somakis (1847–1848)
- Christos Klonaris (1848–1849)
- Georgios A. Rallis (1849–1861)
- Aristeidis Moraitinis (1861–1872)
- Dimitrios Valvis (1872–1885)
- Nikolaos Deligiannis (1885–1890)
- Konstantinos Simantiras (1891–1911)
- Christos Kapsalis (1911–1921)
- Spiridon Tsagris (1921–1922)
- Antonios Zilimon (1922-1933)
- Georgios Panopoulos (1933–1941)
- Konstantinos Kyrillopoulos (1941–1945)
- Yannis Sakketas (1945–1948)
- Ilias Papailiou (1948–1953)
- Christos Stavropoulos (1953)
- Yannis Apostolopoulos (1953–1959)
- Konstantinos Kafkas (1959–1963)
- Stylianos Mavromichalis (1963–1968)
- Theodoros Kamperis (1968–1969)
- Athanasios Georgiou (1969–1970)
- Vasilios Patsourakos (1970–1973)
- Lisandros Kanellakos (1973–1974)
- Dimitris Margellos (1974–1975)
- Konstantinos Zacharis (1975–1976)
- Spiridon Gaggas (1976–1977)
- Georgios Karamanos (1977–1978)
- Spiridon Kollas (1978–1979)
- Dimitrios Skoumpis (1979–1982)
- Georgios Konstas (1982–1985)
- Antonios Stasinos (1985–1989)
- Ioannis Grivas (1989–1990)
- Vasilios Kokkinos (1990–1996)
- Stefanos Matthias (1996–2002)
- Georgios Kapos (2002–2005)
- Romilos Kedikoglou (2005–2007)
- Vasileios Nikopoulos (2007–2009)
- Georgios Kalamidas (2009–2011)
- Rena Asimakopoulou (2011– 2013)
- Michail Theocharidis (2013–2014)
- Athanasios Koutromanos (2014–2015)
- Vassiliki Thanou-Christophilou (2015–2017)
- Vasileios Peppas (2017–2020)
- Aggeliki Aliferopoulou (2020–2021)
- Maria Georgiou (2021–2023)
- Ioanna Klapa-Christodoulea (2023-2025)
- Anastasia Papadopoulou (2025-2026)
- Panagiotis Lymperopoulos (2026-)

== See also ==
- Judicial system of Greece
