= Evangelismos, Larissa =

Settlement in Greece

Evangelismos Ευαγγελισμός
- Community
- Location within Greece
- Coordinates: 39.834°N 22.517°E
- Country: Greece
- Administrative region: Thessaly
- Regional unit: Larissa
- Municipality: Tempi
- Municipal unit: Makrychori

Area
  - Community: 8.453 km^{2} (3.264 sq mi)
- Elevation: 50 m (160 ft)

Population (2021)
  - Community: 107
  - Density: 12.7/km^{2} (32.8/sq mi)
- Time zone: UTC+2 (EET)
  - Summer (DST): UTC+3 (EEST)
- Postal code: 400 04
- Area code: +30-2495
- Vehicle registration: ΡΙ

Evangelismos (Greek: Ευαγγελισμός Λάρισας) is a settlement of the municipal unit of Makrychori, which belongs to the municipality of Tempi in the Larissa regional unit, Thessaly, Greece.

Evangelismos is built at an altitude of 50 meters NE of the regional capital, Larissa, in close proximity to the Vale of Tempe and the mountain range of Ossa. Until 1997, it was the seat of the homonymous community of the province of Larissa, while then it was part of the Kapodistrian municipality of Makrychori. In 2011, it came under the Kallikratis municipality of Tempi.

At the beginning of 2016 at S.E.A. of the area temporarily accommodated refugees passing through from the Middle East.

On 28 February 2023, at 23:21 EET, the area near the settlement was the scene of a head-on collision between an InterCity service and an intermodal train going in the opposite direction on the same stretch of track. With ≥57 dead, ≥85 injured and 2 unaccounted for, it is the single worst railway disaster in the history of railways in Greece.

== Population censuses ==
Historical population
Year	Pop.	±%
1928	255	—
1940	240	−5.9%
1951	231	−3.7%
1961	230	−0.4%
1971	229	−0.4%
1981	202	−11.8%
1991	200	−1.0%
2001	176	−12.0%
2011	127	−27.8%
2021	107	−15.7%
Source: Population censuses
