= Georgios Petrakis =

Greek world war II resistance member

Georgios Petrakis in 1944

Georgios Petrakis (Greek: Γεώργιος Πετράκης; 1890 – 1972), better known as Petrakogiorgis (also transliterated as Petrakoyiorgis, Petrakoyeorgis, Greek: Πετρακογιώργης), was a Greek businessman, partisan, and politician. He was a leading figure in the Cretan resistance of the years 1941 – 1944 against the Axis occupation forces, well respected for his patriotism, courage, honesty, perspicacity and selflessness.

== Before World War II ==
Petrakogiorgis was born in the village of Magarikari, Mesara Plain, Crete, which was then part of the Ottoman Empire. His parents were Emmanuel Petrakis and Antiope Papastefanaki. Petrakogiorgis fought as an officer in the Asia Minor Campaign, after the end of which he worked as a merchant of agricultural products and owned an olive oil mill and a soap factory.

== Resistance service ==
Aged around 50 when the war broke out, Petrakogiorgis was too old to be called up. Nevertheless, he was one of the regional leaders recruited by John Pendlebury in his effort to organize a system of defense before the German invasion of Crete. Shortly after Crete fell to the Germans in late May 1941, many resistance organisations were formed across the island. Petrakogiorgis, who had already fought in the Battle of Crete and lost his eldest son Manolis during its course, swore in his first men during June 1941, near Kamares. Having evacuated the rest of his family to the safety of the Middle East, he devoted himself whole-heartedly to the fight for liberation. Being pro-British, Petrakogiorgis had close ties with EOK and SOE. He had the code-name Selfridge because, in Beevor's words, "his olive mill was Crete's closest approximation to big business".

Petrakogiorgis' group, named "Psiloritis", was active in the regions of Mt. Ida, the Mesara Plain, Mt. Kedros, and the Amari Valley, and was often engaged in close combat with the occupation forces. He and his men fought in fierce battles in the region, such as at Papa to Perama (Παπά το Πέραμα), Kouroupitos (Κουρουπητός), Koutsounares (Κουτσουνάρες), Poros Stavrou (Πόρος Σταυρού), Trahili (Τραχήλι) and Madari (Μαδαρή). They also conducted several sabotage operations, smuggled men and equipment, and participated in the abduction of General Heinrich Kreipe. These activities allowed Petrakogiorgis to demonstrate his leadership and military skills, earning himself the nickname "the eagle of Psiloritis". Yet they also provoked German reprisals: execution of civilians, confiscation of Petrakogiorgis' personal property, and destruction of villages (Magarikari, Kamares, Lochria). The worst of these was the destruction of (el) Vorizia by heavy aerial bombardment.

== Postwar life ==
On 11 October 1944, the day Heraklion was liberated, Petrakogiorgis entered the city triumphantly. He was appointed commander of its garrison and held that post till the beginning of 1945. He later entered politics and was elected member of the Greek Parliament with the Liberal Party, led by Sofoklis Venizelos, in the 1946, 1950, 1951, and 1952 elections. Petrakogiorgis was decorated several times by the Allies and represented Greece in several resistance fighter assemblies.

In 1950, Petrakogiorgis' third daughter Tassoula was 'eloped' by Kostas Kefalogiannis. Kefalogiannis had also taken part in the Resistance whereas his brother Manolis was a member of Parliament with Petrakogiorgis' political opponents, the conservative People's Party. Petrakogiorgis felt insulted by this act and, as a result, the population of Crete divided into two rival camps. Fear of an imminent armed clash led to the suspension of a number of sections of the Greek constitution in the Prefectures of Heraklion and Rethymnon, the declaration of the Psiloritis mountains as a forbidden zone and the deployment of more than 2,000 troops and gendarmerie to ensure order. The incident involved the top-level military, political and religious leadership of Greece and attracted strong international press attention.

Petrakogiorgis died in Heraklion on 14 September 1972. In 2009, a bronze statue was erected near Magarikari in his honor.
