= Razing of Anogeia =

Razing of Greek village and massacre of civilians by Nazi Germans, 1944

Coordinates: 35.2911°N 24.8836°E

- View of Anogeia after its razing
- Location: Anogeia, Hellenic State
- Date: 13 August 1944
- Target: Local Greek villagers
- Deaths: 25
- Perpetrator: (Nazi Germany) German Army
- Motive: Local participation in and collaboration with the Greek resistance and other allies

The Razing of Anogeia (Greek: Καταστροφή των Ανωγείων) or the Holocaust of Anogeia (Greek: Ολοκαύτωμα των Ανωγείων) refers to the complete destruction of the village of Anogeia in central Crete (Greece) and the murder of about 25 of its inhabitants on 13 August 1944 by German occupying forces during World War II. This was the third time Anogeia was destroyed, as the Ottomans had destroyed it twice; first in July 1822 and again in November 1867, during the Great Cretan Revolt.

== Background ==
=== Geography ===
The village of Anogeia (alternate spellings Anogia and Anoyia) sits at an altitude of 750 metres (2,460 feet) on the north slopes of Mt Ida, located 36 kilometres (22 miles) west of Heraklion and 52 km (32 mi) southeast of Rethymno. Anogeia residents are renowned for their rebellious spirit and, backed by the mountainous surrounding terrain, have a long tradition of resisting foreign rule and sheltering rebel fighters. At the time of the German occupation of Crete, Anogeia had approximately 4000 residents who were primarily occupied with pastoral farming. No permanent German garrison was established in Anogeia; however, roundups were carried out occasionally.

=== During the German occupation ===
Before the Battle of Crete, residents of Anogeia laid boulders on Nida Plateau in order to prevent German aircraft and paratroopers from landing. Armed irregular groups of Anogeians participated in the battle, fighting in Heraklion and Rethymno. After the capture of Crete, Anogeia emerged as a stronghold of the local resistance.

Anogeians sheltered British, New Zealander and Australian soldiers and assisted them to escape to Egypt. During the summer of 1941, Giannis Dramountanis (Stefanogiannis) along with Michalis Xilouris set up in Anogeia a resistance organization known as "Independent Group of Anogreia" (Greek: Ανεξάρτητη Ομάς Ανωγείων "ΑΟΑ"), consisting mostly of Anogeians. Several other village residents joined the local ELAS. These resistance groups collaborated with SOE commander Lt Col Tom Dunbabin, providing intelligence and support.

In early May 1944, the abductors of Generalmajor Heinrich Kreipe led by Maj Leigh Fermor spent some time at Anogeia during their march to the south coast of Crete.

On 7 August 1944, a German detachment went up to Anogeia in search of forced labour workers. Several dozen locals were taken hostage and forced to march towards Rethymno. At a location near Damasta, Anogeian guerrillas attacked and eliminated the German detachment, freeing all hostages. On the following day, in an attempt to save Anogeia from German reprisals, a group of Anogeians under the commands of Cpt Bill Moss carried out the Damasta sabotage, killing around 30 German soldiers and destroying an armoured car.

=== The proclamation of the destruction ===
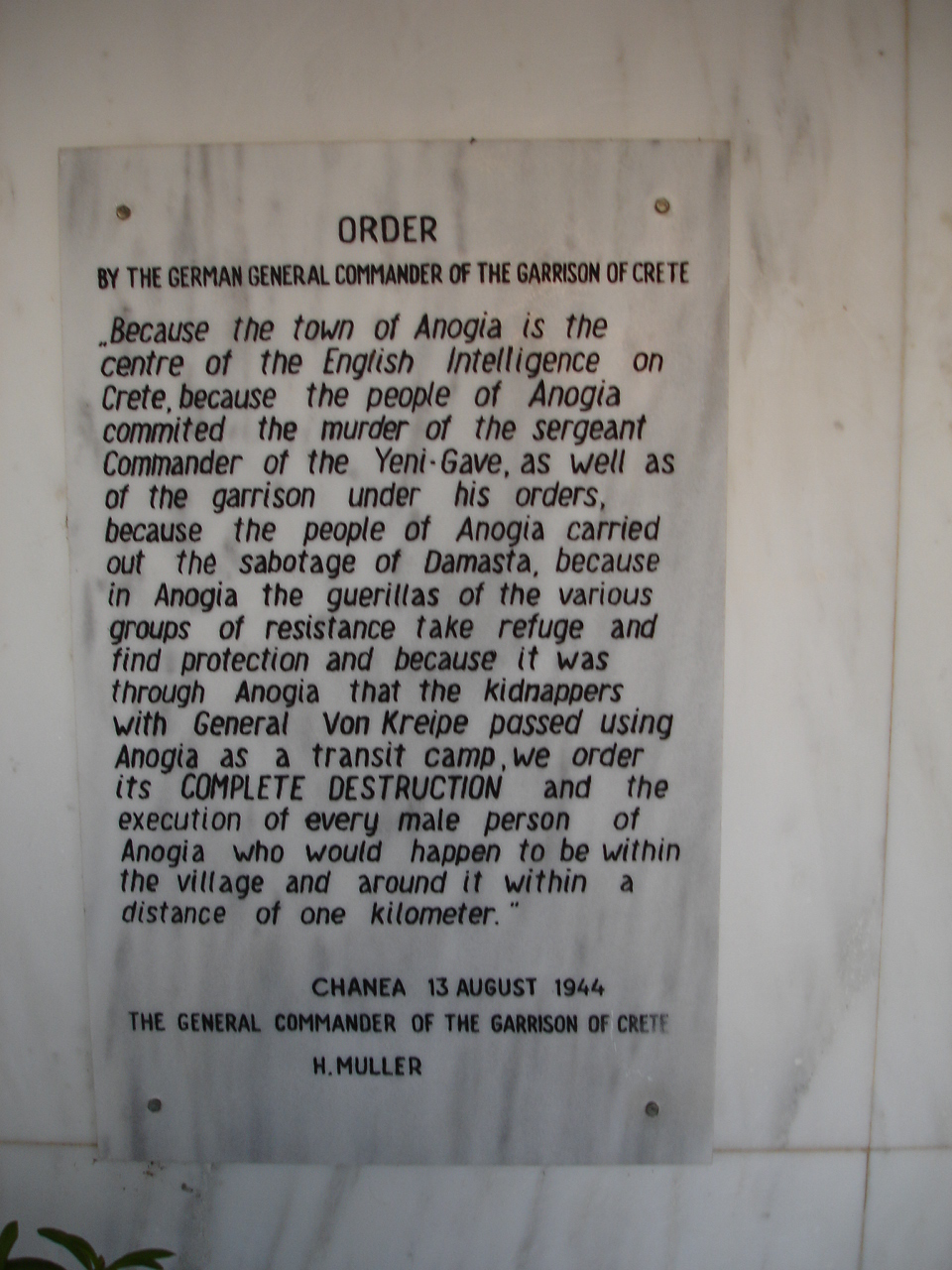
Plaque with Müller's order.

Soon after the news of the Damasta attack reached Generalleutnant Friedrich-Wilhelm Müller, the commander of Crete who one year earlier had orchestrated the Viannos massacres, he issued the following order:

Since the town of Anogeia is the centre of English espionage on Crete, since the people of Anogeia committed the murder of the Sergeant Commander of the Yeni-Gave, as well as of the garrison under his command, since the people of Anogeia carried out the sabotage of Damasta, since in Anogeia the guerrillas of the various resistance bands take refuge and find protection and since the abductors of General Kreipe passed through Anogeia using it as a transit camp, we order its complete destruction and the execution of every male who is found in the village and around it within a distance of one kilometre.

CHANEA 13TH AUGUST 1944
THE GENERAL COMMANDER OF THE GARRISON OF CRETE

== The razing ==
In the early morning of 13 August 1944, German battalions of the 65th regiment/22 Luftlande Infanterie-Division with a strength of around 2000 men moved towards Anogeia. Sentries installed in nearby villages noticed them and notified the people of Anogeia, allowing men to flee to the mountains for safety. Upon entering the village, the German forces gathered the women and children and then forced them to march to the village of Perama. There, approximately 30 kilometres (19 miles) away, women and children were dispersed in nearby villages of the Mylopotamos region. Around 25 villagers, including women, elders and disabled, who refused to abandon their homes, were summarily shot. The village houses were then systematically pillaged, burned and finally dynamited. The pillage and destruction continued for a total of 23 days until early September, turning Anogeia into piles of rubble. During every night, the Germans retreated to the nearby village of Sisarha (Greek: Σίσαρχα). Pack animals were requisitioned to transport the loot to Sisarha, where it was loaded to trucks that transported it to the cities.

According to a report compiled on behalf of the Greek state in the summer of 1945, out of the 940 houses of Anogeia, none stood intact. The newly built school was also destroyed and the three churches had been turned into stables. Shepherd huts around the village were demolished and all livestock (mostly sheep and goats) were seized.

== Aftermath ==
The pillage of Anogeia lasted from 13 August to 5 September 1944. Around 2500 women and children were displaced from the village. Having lost all their belongings, they were forced to live in absolute poverty and managed to survive only thanks to the solidarity of the residents of nearby villages, who in many occasions housed them for years.

In 1945, Müller was captured by the Red Army in East Prussia. In 1946, he was tried by a Greek court in Athens for ordering atrocities against civilians. He was sentenced to death on 9 December 1946 and executed by firing squad on 20 May 1947.

Anogeia has been declared a martyred village with the Presidential Decree 399 (ΦΕΚ 277/16.12.1998). Today, an engraved commemorative plaque with Müller's order stands in the central square.

== See also ==
- Kidnap of Heinrich Kreipe
- Damasta sabotage
- Viannos massacres
- Razing of Kandanos
- Razing of Vorizia
