= Loudovikos =

Loudovikos may refer to:

- Nikolaos Loudovikos
- Loudovikos ton Anogeion
- Greek corvette Loudovikos
- Loudovikos Armansperg
