= Battle of Trahili =

1943 battle during the German occupation of Crete in World War II

Coordinates: 35°9′1″N 24°50′48″E

The Battle of Trahili (Greek: Μάχη στο Τραχήλι) was fought on 15 August 1943 between Cretan partisans and German occupying forces during World War II. It took place near the village of Vorizia in south-central Crete, when German forces attempted to surround a small group of partisans led by the local chieftain Petrakogiorgis. Most of the partisans managed to escape, despite being heavily outnumbered.

== Background ==
In June 1941, soon after the fall of Crete to the Axis, Georgios Petrakis (Petrakogiorgis) and five men from Vorizia established the first resistance group in the south slopes of Mt. Ida. This group, named "Psiloritis" (Greek: Ψηλορείτης), was active in the regions of Mt. Ida, Messara plain, Mt. Kedros and Amari valley throughout the occupation of Crete. The group engaged in close combat with the occupation forces on several occasions and had close ties with the British SOE. As noted by Beevor, [the Germans had] harboured an especially personal enmity for Petrakogiorgis, more than for any other chieftain.

On 14 August 1943, the eve of the Dormition, most of Petrakogiorgis men were away visiting their families. He and 21 more men were hiding north of the village of Vorizia. They had arranged to receive the Holy Communion from a monk of the nearby Vrontisi Monastery and were preparing to celebrate the Dormition. Unknowingly, however, their whereabouts were betrayed to the Germans.

== The battle ==
On the early morning of 15 August 1943, partisan sentries spotted German forces approaching their hideout from three different directions with an estimated total strength of 3500 men. After a brief discussion, the partisans decided to head towards the nearby forest of Rouvas and avoid villages as this might invoke German reprisals. On their way, at an altitude of approx. 1000 meters, they encountered a German force consisting of a few hundred men who were already in control of the pass of Trahili. The partisans sought cover in the rocks and started a fierce battle under the scorching sun which lasted until the early evening. The Germans heavily outnumbered Petrakogiorgis and his men, were much better armed and had artillery support from the town of Tymbaki. Nevertheless, they did not succeed in neutralizing the partisans, who fought bravely and managed to escape after losing 7 of their comrades and having 4 more wounded. In his diary, Petrakogiorgis reports 33 German casualties whereas Beevor mentions 13.

== Aftermath ==
A few days after the battle of Trahili and in reprisal for the assistance of locals to the partisans, the village of Vorizia was destroyed by aerial bombardment.

A marble plaque at Trahili commemorates the battle and the fallen partisans.

== See also ==
- Razing of Vorizia
