= Razing of Vorizia =

1943 destruction of the Cretan village of Vorizia by Axis occupying forces

Coordinates: 35°9′1″N 24°50′48″E

View of Vorizia after being destroyed

The razing of Vorizia (Greek: Καταστροφή των Βοριζίων) refers to the destruction of the village of Vorizia (Βορίζια) in Crete (Greece) by aerial bombardment and the murder of five of its inhabitants on 27 August 1943 by German occupying forces during World War II.

== Background ==
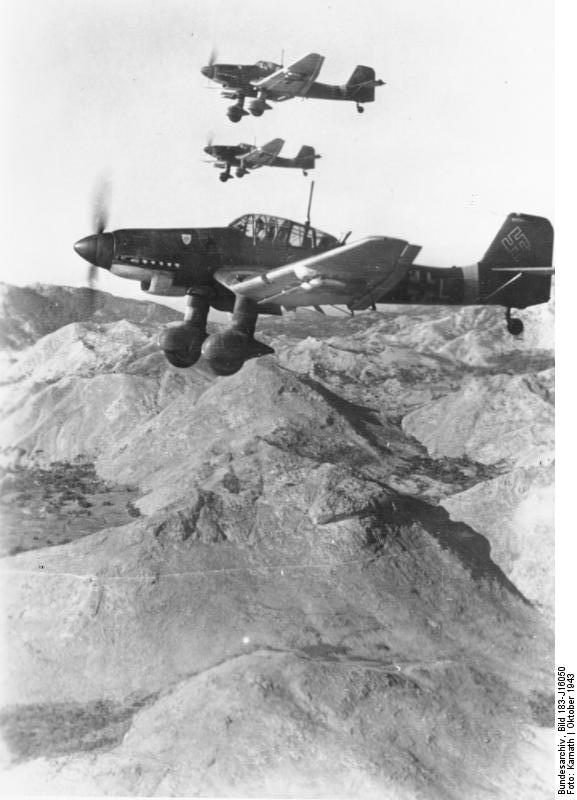
Group of Ju 87s in flight.

The village of Vorizia (or Voriza) is built on the south slopes of Mt Ida, located approximately 55 kilometres (34 miles) south of Heraklion. Its residents are primarily occupied with olive tree cultivation and pastoral farming.

During the German occupation of Crete, residents of Vorizia participated or provided aid to the resistance. The first resistance group in the region was established in June 1941 by Georgios Petrakis (Petrakogiorgis) and five men from Vorizia.

== The razing ==
On 15 August 1943, the resistance group of Petrakogiorgis clashed with a German force. Despite being heavily outnumbered, Petrakogiorgis and his band managed to escape after fierce fighting that lasted the whole day. The partisans lost seven men whereas the Germans thirteen. This conflict came to be known as the Battle of Trahili, owing its name to the area it took place.

In reprisal for the help of locals to the partisans, General Müller ordered German forces to surround Vorizia on 27 August 1943. The villagers were led to the churchyard, three of them were summarily shot that day and two the next day. Later on, the others were driven out of the village and seven Junkers Ju 87 Stuka dive bombers appeared, dropping a total of 21 (presumably 50 kg) bombs. Following the bombing, the village ruins were doused with petrol and set on fire.

== Aftermath ==
As a result of the bombing, Vorizia was completely destroyed and its residents were forced to seek shelter in nearby villages. After the war, the Greek state built a new settlement near the destroyed one. Nevertheless, the locals did not agree to relocate and chose to rebuild their village on the ruins on the destroyed one.

== See also ==
- Razing of Kandanos
- Razing of Anogeia
