= Psiloritis Natural Park =

Central Cretan UNESCO Global Geopark

Psiloritis Nature Park
- (in Greek) Φυσικό Πάρκο Ψηλορείτη
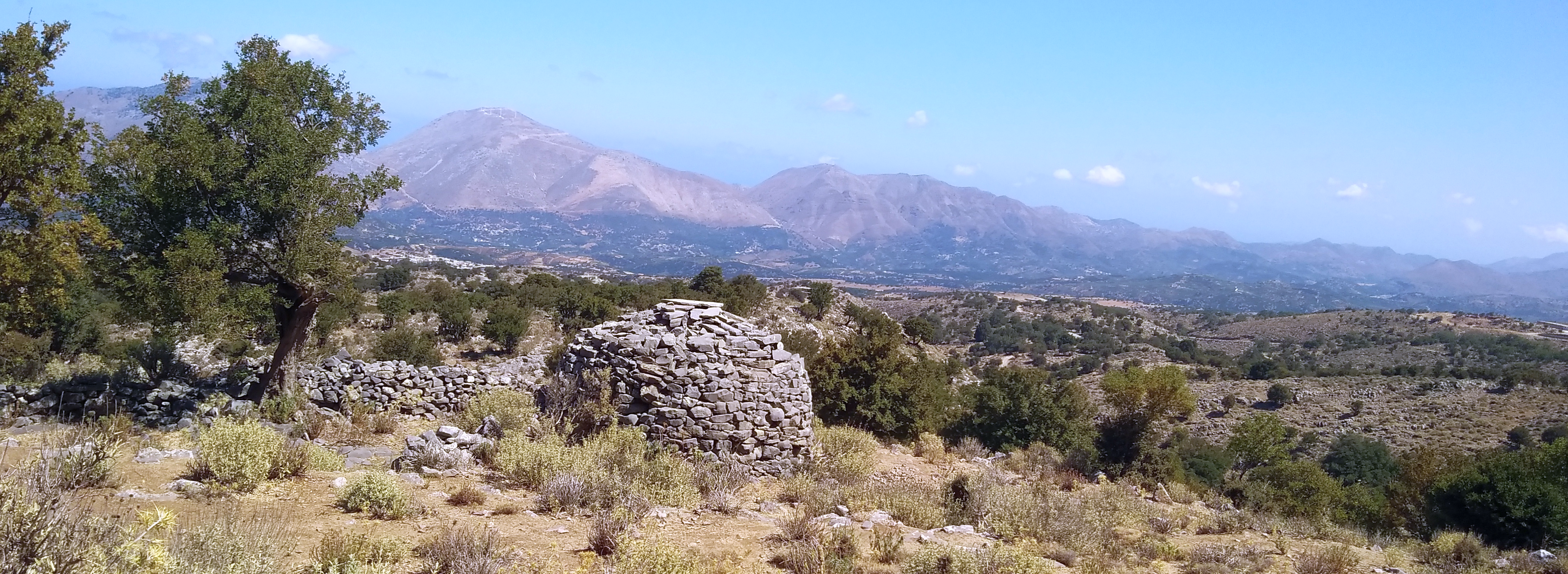
- Traditional shepherds' hut near Livadia

- Location within Greece
- Location: Crete, Greece
- Area: 1,159 km^{2} (447 sq mi)
- Established: 2001
- Governing body: AKOMM – Psiloritis development agency s.a, organization of local government
- Website: www.psiloritisgeopark.gr

Psiloritis Natural or Nature Park (Greek Φυσικό Πάρκο Ψηλορείτη) (Note: The usage is not native English. It translates fisiko parko, which is native Greek, and is used by the Natural History Museum of Crete.) is a UNESCO Global geopark located in the central part of the island of Crete, in southern Greece.

== History ==
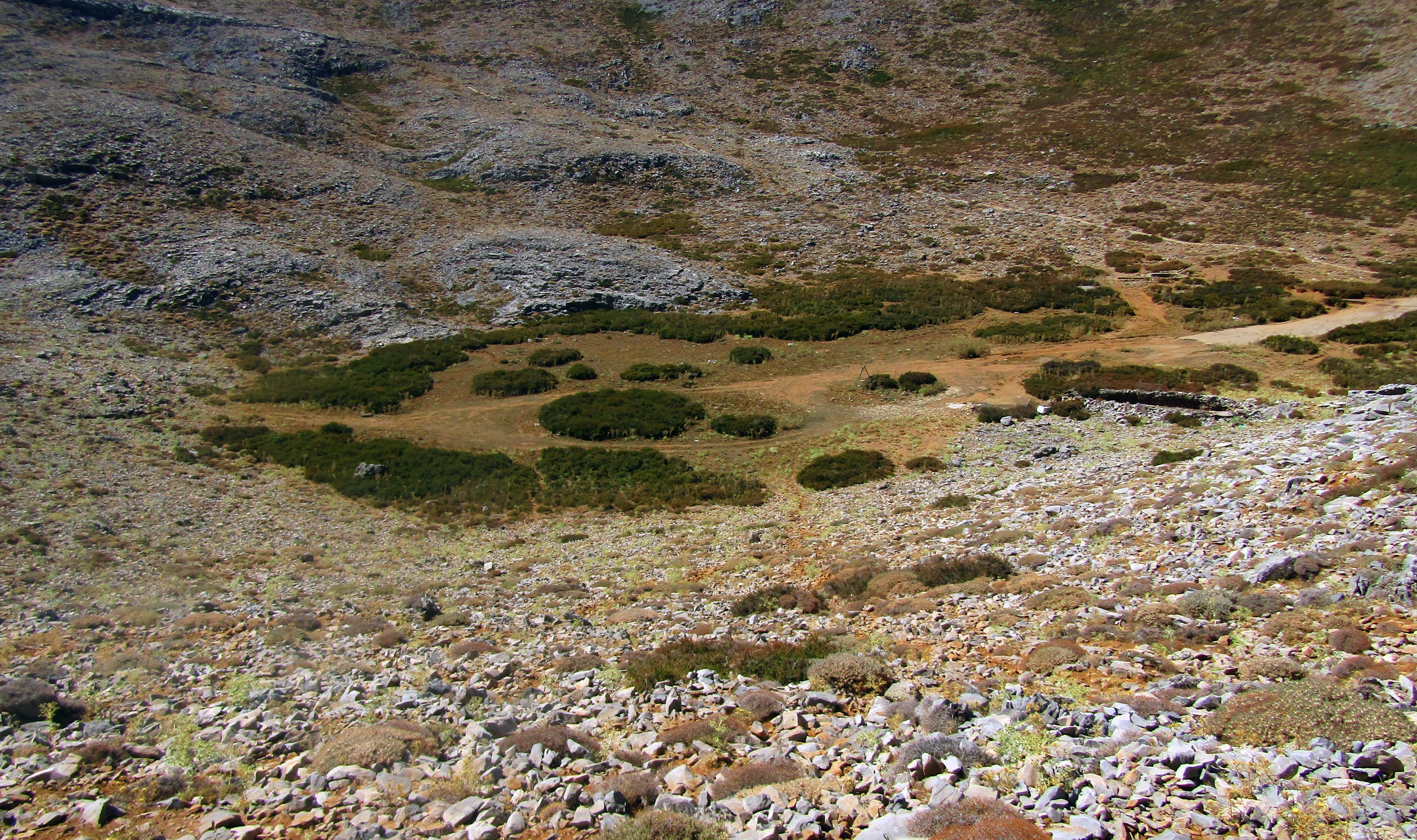
A ponor close to the Mygero mountain hut (N side of Mt. Ida)

Since 2001 the park is member of the European Geoparks Network, which is within the UNESCO Global Geoparks Network. It is a local authorities' initiative, managed by the geopark's management committee under the AKOMM Psiloritis S.A. The Natural History Museum of the University of Crete is the scientific advisor of the park.

== Features ==
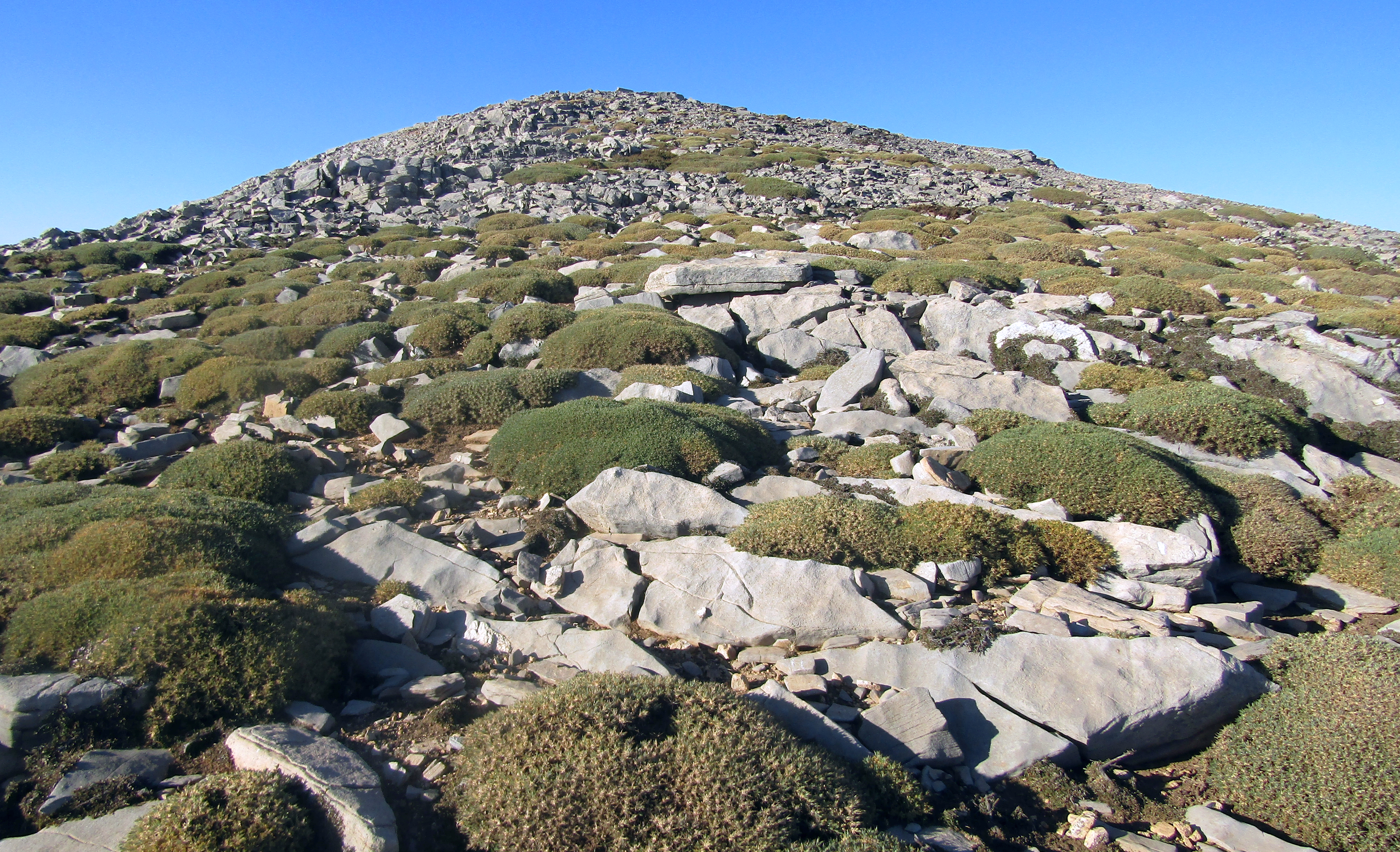
Mountain karstic steppe (Mount Agathias)

Psiloritis Natural Park extends on the Psiloritis mountain and its northern foothills till the Cretan Sea. It has an area of 1159 km^{2}. Administratively the park is split into the Prefectures of Rethymno and Heraklion. The headquarters of the park are located at the municipality of Anogeia.

The park aims to conserve natural and cultural heritage of Psiloritis area through promotional and educational activities, as well as sustainable development initiatives like geotourism, ecotourism and agrotourism. Due to its geological features many universities across the world organise field trips for their students to visit the park. Among the geological protected features of the park there are many caves, included the Idaean Cave. The caves, as well as other relevant features of the park, are connected to the Karstic nature of the Mount Ida massif.
