= Sacred caves of Crete =

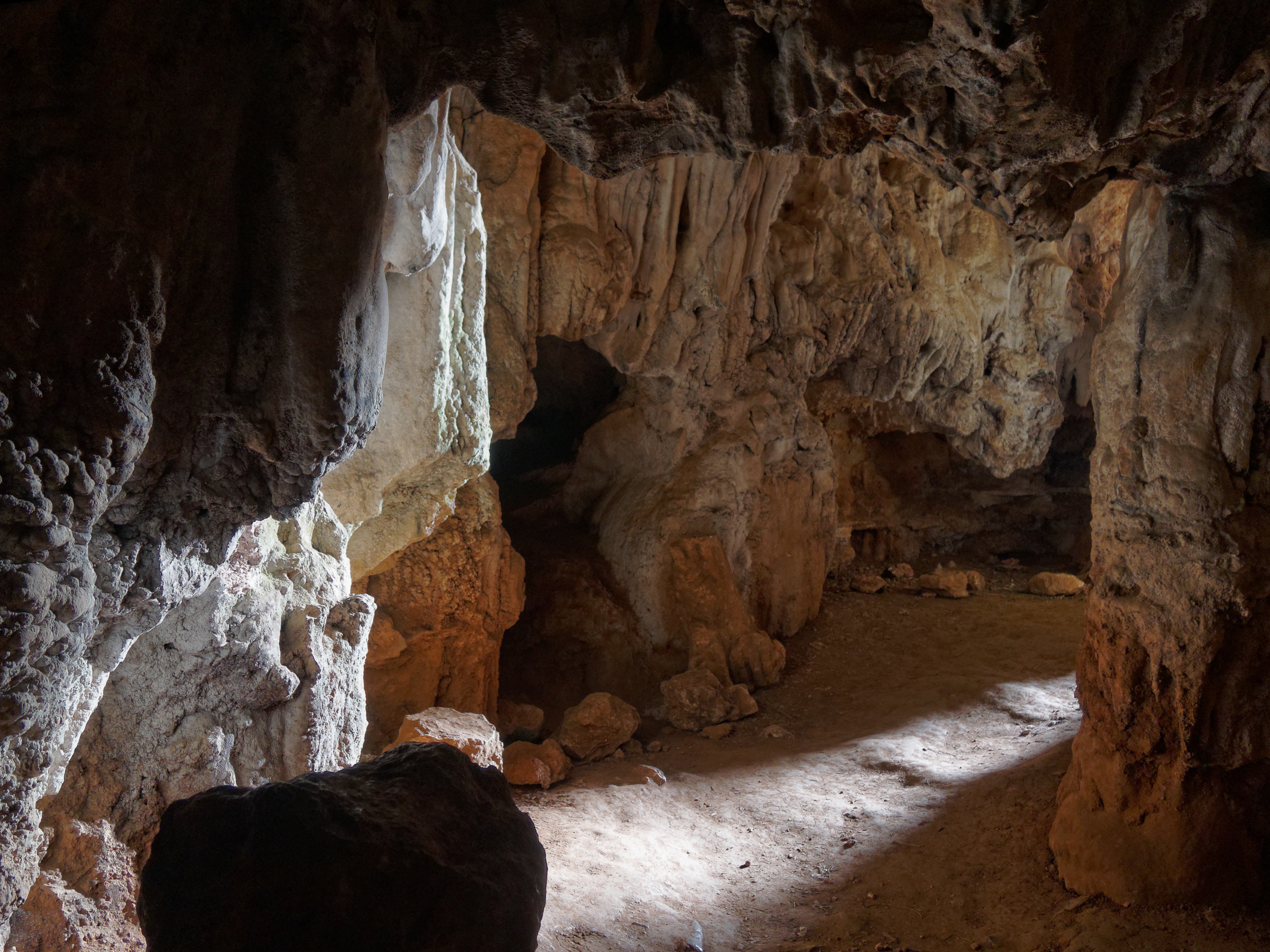
Inside the Trapeza Cave

Sacred caves and peak sanctuaries are characteristic holy places of ancient Minoan Crete. Most scholars agree that sacred caves were used by the Minoans for religious rites, and some for burial. While all peak sanctuaries have clay human figurines, only Idaeon, Trapeza and Psychro have them among the sacred caves. Clay body parts, also called votive body parts, common among peak sanctuaries, appear in no caves with the exception of a bronze leg in Psychro.

One author, Tyree (1974), restricts "sacred caves" to those with architectural additions such as "paved areas, partition walls, and low walls surrounding stalagmites", as well as the presence (upon excavation) of "cult implements" of various kinds.

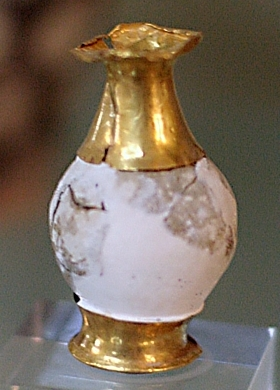
Vessel made from an egg with gold fittings, found in the Kamares Cave

Some were "burial caves", used in the Neolithic and Early Minoan periods as secondary burial sites for a community. It is thought that the primary burial site was probably a tholos beehive tomb in the area, from which remains were moved into the cave after a period. Whether this usage overlapped with usage for religious cult, or whether the two phases were distinct, is uncertain and a matter of discussion.

== List of sacred caves ==
- Arkalochori
- Hagios Charalambos - burial cave
- Inatos
- Kamares, where Kamares ware was first found
- Mameloukou
- Phaneromeni
- Skotino
- Stravomyti

== See also ==
- Asphendou Cave petroglyphs
