= Teleia (political party) =

Teleia Τελεία
- Founder: Apostle Gletso
- Founded: 2014
- Dissolved: 2017
- Ideology: Liberalism
- Political position: Centre

Teleia (Greek: Τελεία, Greek for Full stop) was a Greek political party which was founded in 2014 by actor and mayor of Stylida Apostle Gletsos. the party was founded on December 8, 2014, in Anogia.

== Candidates ==
On January 9, 2015, the party put forth their candidates for the January 2015 Greek legislative elections.

== Election results ==
Year	Number of votes	percentage of votes	Seats in the Greek Parliament
January 2015	109.483	1,77%	0 / 300
