= Mount Agathias =

Mountain in Greece

- Greek: Αγκαθιάς
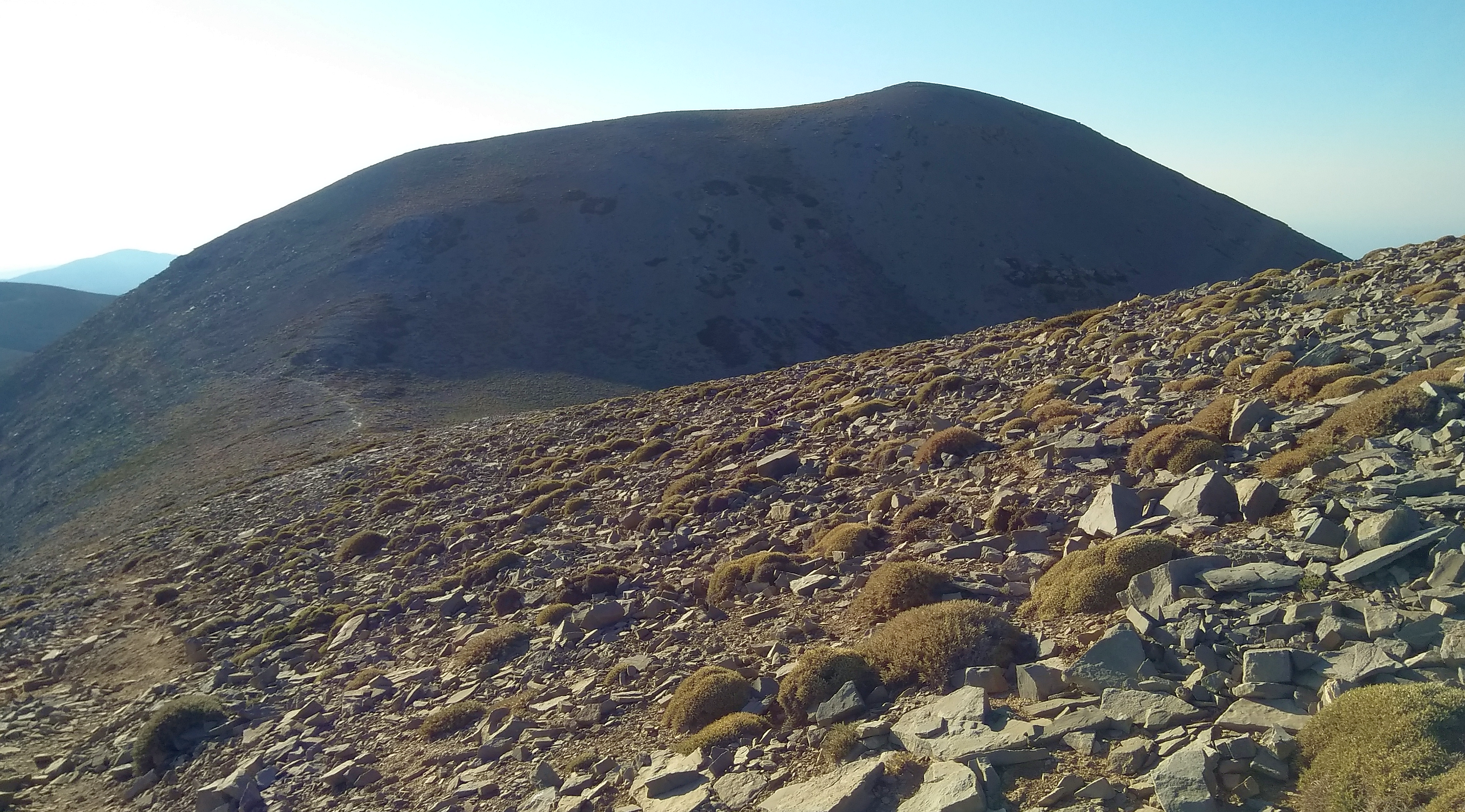
- View of the Agathias from west

Highest point
- Elevation: 2,424 m (7,953 ft)
- Prominence: 103 m (338 ft)
- Coordinates: 35°13′13″N 24°47′01″E

Geography
- Location within Greece
- Location: Crete, Greece

Climbing
- First ascent: ancestral
- Easiest route: hike

Mount Agathias (Greek: Αγκαθιάς), at 2,424 m, is one of the highest mountains on Crete.

== Features ==
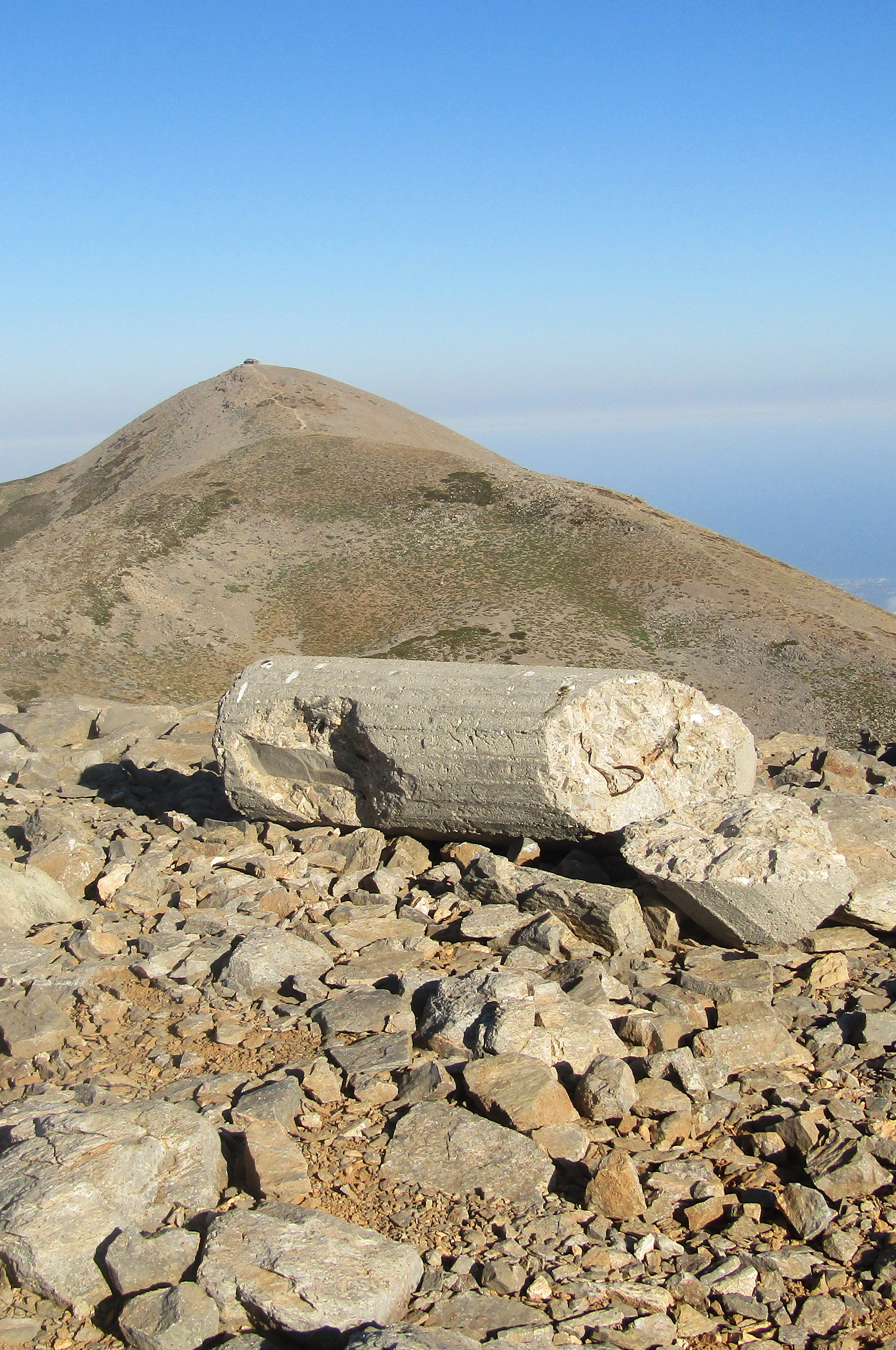
Damaged trig point on the summit

Located in the Rethymno regional unit, the Agathias stands close to the Psiloritis, the highest summit of Mount Ida massif and of the whole island. It belongs to the water divide between the southern part of Crete, tributary of the Libyan Sea, and the northern one, facing the Aegean Sea. A saddle at 2321 m West of mount Agathias connects it with the Psiloritis, while eastwards the ridge continues with Mount Voloumenou. A natural park, member of UNESCO's Global Geoparks Network, includes the Agathias and the Mt. Ida massif as a whole.

== Access to the summit ==
The summit of Mount Agathias can be reached following a track on a rocky terrain branching from the E4 European long distance path.
