= Kamares, Crete =

Kamares Καμάρες
- Community
- Location within Greece
- Coordinates: 35°09′07″N 24°49′16″E
- Country: Greece
- Administrative region: Crete
- Regional unit: Heraklion
- Municipality: Faistos
- Municipal unit: Tympaki

Population (2021)
  - Community: 280
- Time zone: UTC+2 (EET)
  - Summer (DST): UTC+3 (EEST)

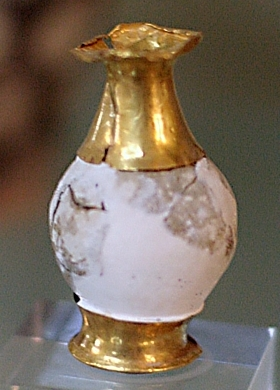
Vessel made from an egg with gold fittings, found in the cave

Kamares (Greek: Καμάρες) is a village in south-central Crete, Greece. It is the location of the archaeological site of Kamares Cave, a Minoan sacred cave. The sacred cave at Kamares is slightly offset from a saddle in the Psiloriti Range virtually aligned with the location of nearby Phaistos. Some of the best examples of Middle Minoan pottery have been recovered from the Kamares cave. Kamares has provided the type name for Kamares ware, a ceramic type dating from MM IA, or the First Palace Period. This pottery is a light-on-dark polychrome ware, with forms including jugs and cups.

== See also ==
- Hagia Triada
