= Trapeza, Crete =

Neolithic and Bronze-Age sacred cave in Greece

Coordinates: 35.1979°N 25.4936°E

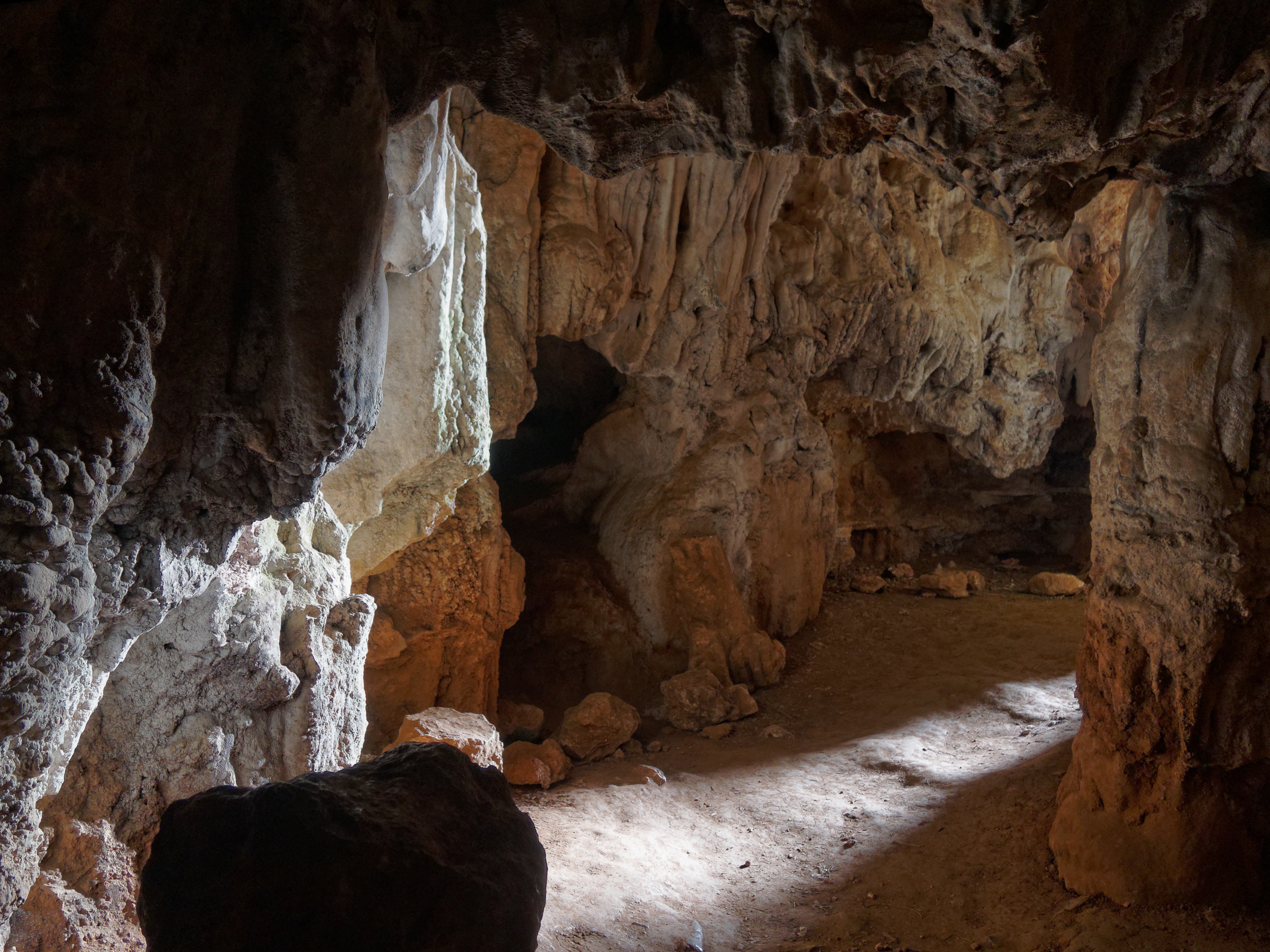
Inside Trapeza Cave

Trapeza, Crete is a Neolithic and Bronze Age sacred cave on the island of Crete in Greece. Some of the Bronze Age pottery finds at Trapeza are similar to specimens recovered at Knossos and Vasiliki.

It is described as a "burial cave", and sometimes called the "table of Minos" (trapeza meaning 'table' in Greek).

== See also ==
- Minoan civilization
