= Stravomyti Cave =

Cave and archaeological site in Greece

- Σπήλαιο Στραβομύτη (Greek)
- Location within Greece
- 35°15′0″N 25°8′59.9″E
- Location: Crete
- Region: Greece

Stravomyti Cave is an ancient Minoan cave on Crete.

== Geography ==
Stravomyti Cave is 400 meters above sea level on Mt. Juktas' southwest slope.

== Archaeology ==
Stravomyti Cave first saw use during Neolithic times, as a refuge and burial. During the Early Minoan period, the quality of pottery suggests that people lived in the caves. Thereafter, it was used for storage and worship.

The cave may have once been a shrine to a female deity - Artemis, Diktynna or perhaps Eileithyia.
