= Anogeia =

Anogeia Ανώγεια
- Municipality
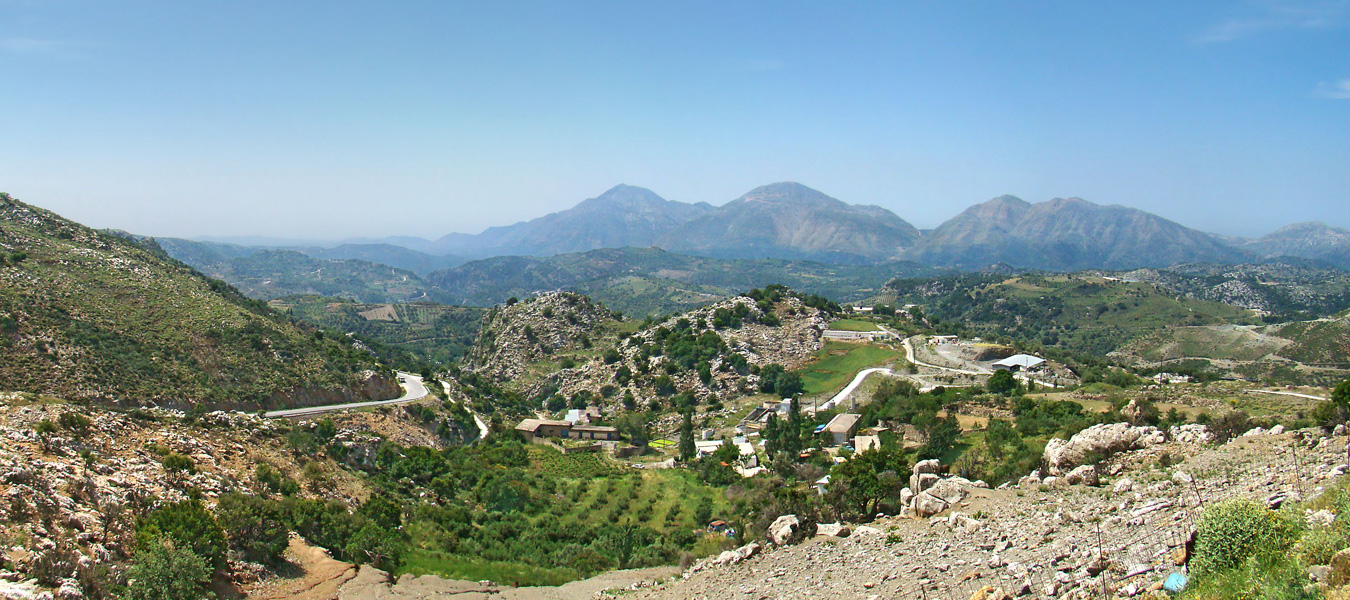
- Landscape around Anogeia

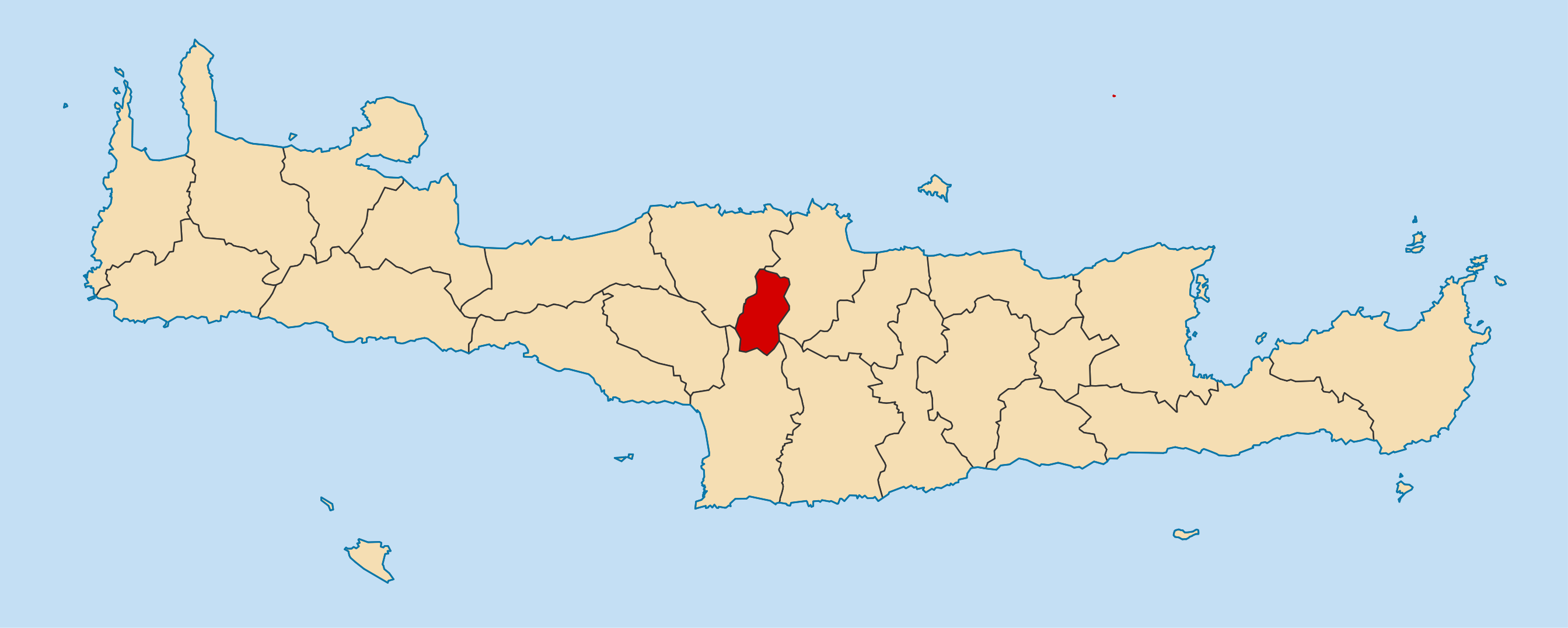

- Location within Greece
- Coordinates: 35°17′N 24°53′E
- Country: Greece
- Administrative region: Crete
- Regional unit: Rethymno

Area
  - Municipality: 102.6 km^{2} (39.6 sq mi)
- Elevation: 738 m (2,421 ft)

Population (2021)
  - Municipality: 2,240
  - Density: 21.8/km^{2} (56.5/sq mi)
- Time zone: UTC+2 (EET)
  - Summer (DST): UTC+3 (EEST)
- Vehicle registration: ΡΕ

Anogeia (Ανώγεια) is a municipality in the Rethymno regional unit, Crete, Greece. The municipality has an area of 102.632 km^{2} (39.626 sq mi). Population 2,240 (2021).

When Anogeia was founded and by whom, is uncertain. According to a legend, a shepherd from Axos found an icon depicting Saint John the Baptist on the slopes of Psiloreitis. Pious as he was, he picked it up carefully, wrapped it in a towel, took it to his home and placed it there alongside other icons. On the following day he was astonished to find out that the icon had disappeared. Terrified, he returned to the place he had found it the previous day, where he was exhilarated to discover the icon in exactly the same place. This inexplicable phenomenon was considered to be an order from the heavens, to build there a temple dedicated to Saint John the Baptist.

The church of Saint John seems to be the first building of the settlement, which later came to be known as "Anogia". Within the temple of Saint John are the remains of Byzantine wall drawings, which date to the 11th century.

The historian Stelios Spanakis, writes: “Anogia is a town –municipality in the Mylopotamos Province of the Prefecture of Rethymno. In the 1981 census it numbered 2.449 citizens. It is in the northern reaches of Psiloreitis, at an altitude of 700-790 meters. When in 1182 Crete was divided among the 12 Young Princes of Byzantium, Anogia were given to the family of Fokas. Anogia are referred to by Venetian and Greek scholars and historians as Anogia, or Anoia. In 1593 it was already a significant settlement, numbering 911 citizens. Anogia are referred to as a revolutionary place during the years of Turkish occupation. In 1822, when the Anogians were fighting the Turks in Messara, Serif Pasha found the village empty and put it to the torch. In November 1866, during the Great Cretan Revolt, Resit Pasha tried to capture Anogia, but he was repulsed by the Anogians and other villagers from Mylopotamos.” This tradition continued during the German occupation and in August 1944 the village was once again razed to the ground in reprisal for the local's participation in the resistance.

The living conditions of the people of Anogia, as well as those of other mountain villages in Crete, were extremely difficult. Anogians of old times were mainly shepherds, goatherds and not so many of them were farmers. The barren soil, the harsh winters, the frequent revolts and the constant purges from the conquerors contributed to the primitive living conditions, to the great poverty and the lack of even the most basic of comforts. The French historian Victor Bérard (1897) during his journeys in Crete, dedicated but a few lines for the village of Anogia, where with a raw and laconic way describes the hopeless living conditions of the time: “The village Anogia, resembles the outposts on the remote peaks of old, where men and animals live together in miserable hovels”. The Italian Vittorio Simonelli who visited Crete in 1893, was much more generous in his descriptions. First, he was put up at a “tolerable inn”. As for the villagers themselves, both men and women, made a great impression on him, when on a Sunday he saw them going to the church. He wrote: “Anogian women are beautiful, with red cheeks and faces that are lit up by eyes black and shiny, like agate. Their traditional clothing, accentuates the health and beauty that characterize the ancient Cretan archetype. The men are also handsome, being tall, lean, and easy in their movement, proud, but without even a trace of ferociousness”.

In recent years, the Yakinthia (Hyacinthia) cultural festival is held at an altitude of 1200m in the Nida Plateau, south of Anogeia. The festival is held annually every July and focuses on the Cretan folk tradition and its blending with the traditions of Greece and the Mediterranean.

== Contribution to national liberation struggles ==
In 1941 in Anogia, the 'Liberation Action Committee' was founded. Anogia was the core of the Resistance in Crete and the abduction of General Kreipe took place in Anogia and the evacuation to take him to Cairo was orchestrated there. In retaliation, on August 13, 1944, the commander of Fortress Crete Müller ordered the demolition of Anogia and annihilation of every male from Anogia in a radius of 1 kilometre. Thus, on August 13 of 1944, three battalions of German troops surrounded Anogia and set garrisons in the surrounding hills. They arrested 80 elders and sent them to Heraklion and executed nine disabled persons, all others were evacuated to the surrounding mountains. They blew up every single house with dynamite, and started an arson, about 800 houses became rubble and they burned 6 elderly disabled women. The remaining men fled to Mount Psiloritis to safety.

Between 1941 and 1944, during the fight against the German invaders, a total of 104 Anogians were killed .

In 1946, the state honored Anogia with the award of the War Cross first class for the disasters which affected and for their heroism. The following year, the community, honoris causa, was recognized as Anogeia.

== Politics ==
Parliamentary election results since 2000
6/2023	5/2023	2019	9/2015	1/2015	6/2012
1. ND 38.74%; 2. SYRIZA 28.35%; 3. PASOK 21.13%; 4. KKE 8.03%; 5. Others 3.75%	1. ND 36.74%; 2. SYRIZA 34.42%; 3. PASOK 15.26%; 4. KKE 9.58%; 5. MERA25 1.03%; 6. Others 2.97%	1. SYRIZA 42.14%; 2. ND 36.81%; 3. PASOK 10.61%; 4. KKE 7.58%; 5. MERA25 1.18%; 6. Others 1.68%	1. SYRIZA 36.11%; 2. ND 35.99%; 3. PASOK 11.91%; 4. KKE 10.00%; 5. River 1.34%; 6. EK 1.15%; 7. Others 3.50%	1. ND 33.26%; 2. SYRIZA 28.62%; 3. KIDISO 17.07%; 4. KKE 9.85%; 5. River 3.64%; 6. PASOK 2.87%; 7. ANEL 1.47%; 8. Teleia 1.23%; 9. Others 1.99%	1. ND 33.59%; 2. SYRIZA 24.43%; 3. PASOK 22.20%; 4. KKE 8.75%; 5. DIMAR 4.46%; 6. ANEL 3.32%; 7. Others 3.25%
5/2012	2009	2007	2004	2000	
1. ND 27.06%; 2. PASOK 24.50%; 3. KKE 12.31%; 4. SYRIZA 11.74%; 5. DISY 4.99%; 6. ANEL 4.59%; 7. DIMAR 4.54%; 8. OP 2.33%; 9. ANTARSYA 1.19%; 10. DIMAN–EPAM 1.08%; 11. Others 5.67%	1. PASOK 47.45%; 2. ND 37.76%; 3. KKE 8.98%; 4. SYRIZA 3.83%; 5. Others 1.98%	1. ND 44.68%; 2. PASOK 43.87%; 3. KKE 7.29%; 4. SYRIZA 3.39%; 5. Others 0.77%	1. ND 45.97%; 2. PASOK 42.15%; 3. KKE 8.02%; 4. SYRIZA 3.10%; 5. Others 0.76%	1. PASOK 45.83%; 2. ND 45.36%; 3. KKE 4.68%; 4. Coalition 2.67%; 5. Others 1.46%	

European Parliament election results since 1999
2024	2019	2014	2009	2004	1999
1. ND 33.03%; 2. PASOK 27.54%; 3. SYRIZA 12.81%; 4. KKE 9.53%; 5. FL 6.79%; 6. NA 3.59%; 7. Victory 1.37%; 8. EL 1.30%; 9. PE 1.07%; 10. MERA25 1.07%; 11. Others 1.90%	1. ND 37.90%; 2. SYRIZA 33.18%; 3. PASOK 15.03%; 4. KKE 7.89%; 5. MERA25 1.44%; 6. Others 4.56%	1. ND 36.06%; 2. SYRIZA 21.85%; 3. PASOK 19.45%; 4. KKE 8.67%; 5. River 4.26%; 6. EEP 1.86%; 7. ANEL 1.22%; 8. Others 6.63%	1. PASOK 43.88%; 2. ND 37.29%; 3. KKE 9.74%; 4. SYRIZA 4.57%; 5. LAOS 1.63%; 6. OP 1.14%; 7. Others 1.75%	1. ND 45.12%; 2. PASOK 39.63%; 3. KKE 10.03%; 4. Coalition 3.82%; 5. Others 1.40%	1. PASOK 43.24%; 2. ND 40.77%; 3. KKE 6.27%; 4. Coalition 4.02%; 5. DIKKI 2.78%; 6. Others 2.92%

== Notable people ==
- Nikos Xylouris, aka Psaronikos (1936–1980), singer, Cretan lyra player, composer
- Antonis Xylouris, aka Psarantonis (1939), singer, Cretan lyra player, composer
- Giorgis Dramountanis aka Loudovikos ton Anogeion (1951), singer, Cretan mandolin player, composer
- Patrick Leigh Fermor
