= Loudovikos ton Anogeion =

Greek composer and singer

Loudovikos ton Anogeion (Greek: Λουδοβίκος των Ανωγείων) is the performing name of George Dramountanis, a contemporary Greek musician and composer from Crete.

== Biography ==
George Dramountanis was born οn 28 January 1951 in the village of Anogeia, Crete.
