= Nida Plateau =

Coordinates: 35°12′19″N 24°50′31″E

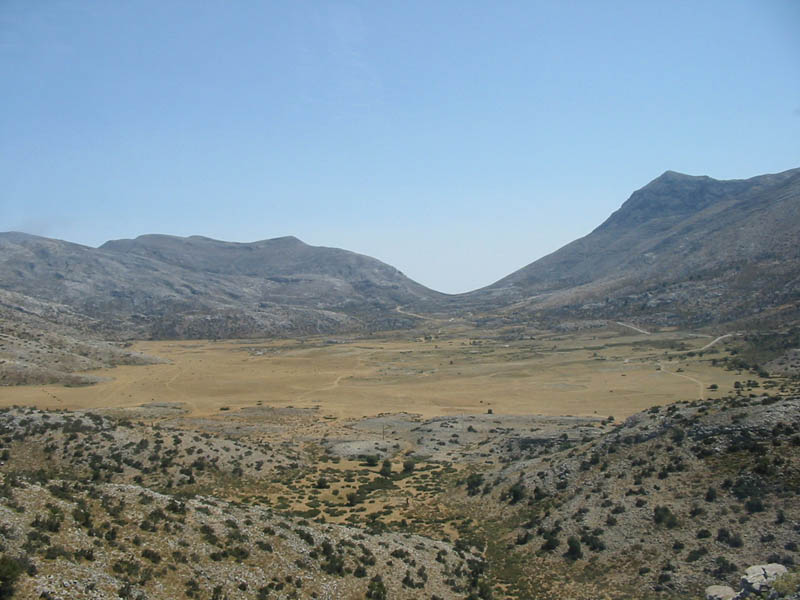
Nida plateau

The Nida Plateau (Greek: Οροπέδιο Νίδας), is a plateau in the Rethymno regional unit on the island of Crete in Greece. It lies between the east and west peaks of Mount Ida, at an altitude of 1,400 meters and approximately 22 km from the village of Anogeia. The plateau is not cultivated but used as grazing ground. A branch of the European walking route E4 to the Timios Stavros summit of Mt Ida starts west of the plateau. The plateau is used in winter for downhill skiing.
