= Mount Ida (Crete) =

Central mountain massif in Crete also called Psiloritis

- Psiloritis (summit Ida)
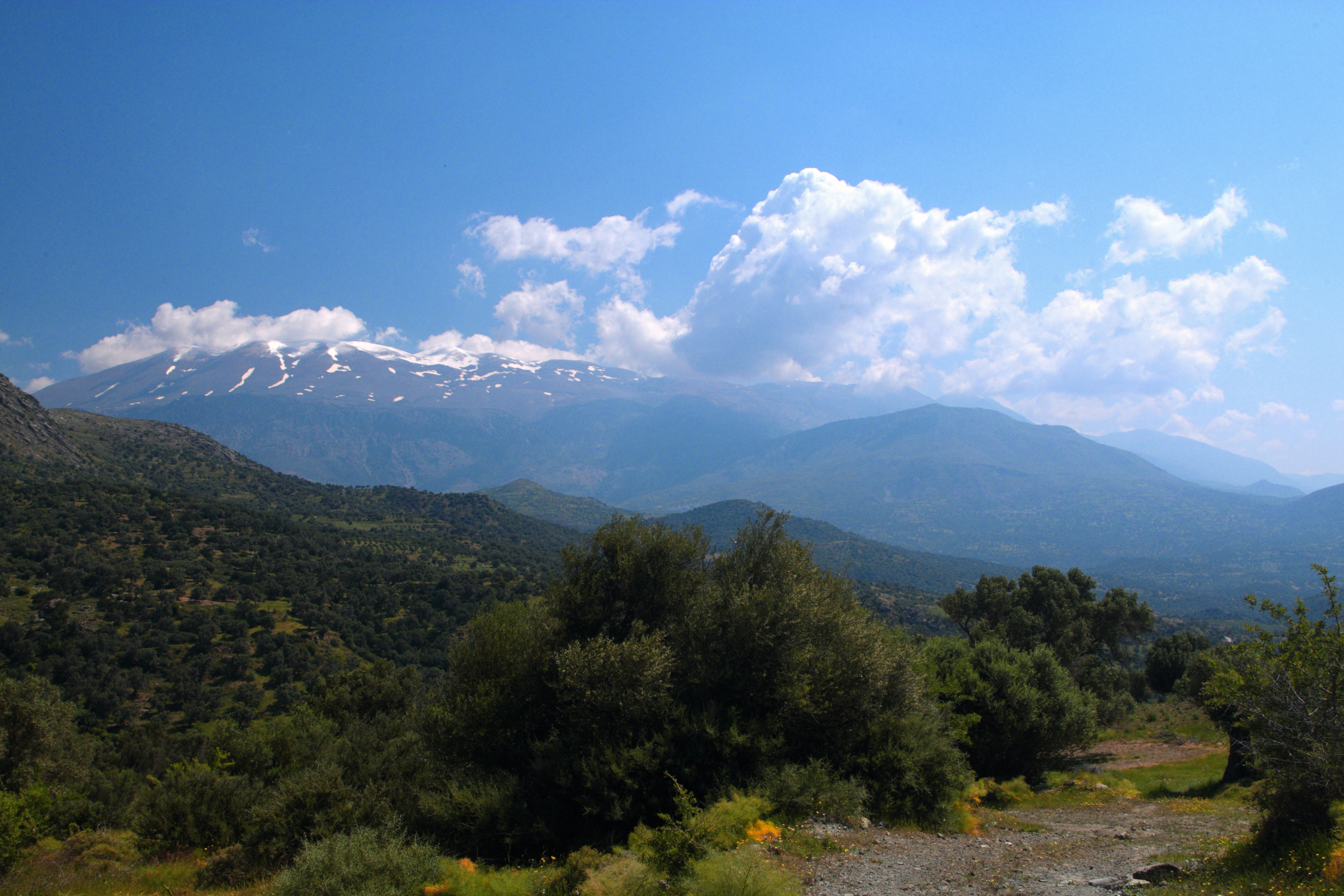
- View of Psiloritis mountains from the west

Highest point
- Elevation: 2,456 m (8,058 ft)
- Prominence: 2,456 m (8,058 ft)
- Isolation: 439.94 km (273.37 mi)
- Listing: Ultra
- Coordinates: 35°13′36″N 24°46′21″E

Geography
- Location within Greece
- Location: Crete, Greece

Mount Ida (Greek: Ἴδα), known variously as Idha, Ídhi, Idi, and Ita (the massif including the mountain is called Psiloritis, Greek: Ψηλορείτης), is the highest mountain on the island of Crete, with an elevation of 2,456 metres (8,058 ft). It has the highest topographic prominence of any mountain in Greece. A natural park which includes Mount Ida is a member of UNESCO's Global Geoparks Network.

Located in the Rethymno regional unit, Ida was sacred to the Titaness Rhea in Greek mythology. On its slopes lies one of the caves, Idaion Antron, the Idaean Cave, in which, according to legend, the god Zeus was born. Other legends, however, place his birthplace in Psychro Cave on the Lasithi Plateau.

An archaeobotanical study was conducted that looked at the different plant bases in Minoan villas during the Neo-palatial time period in Crete. There was a rich range of food plants that were found to contain essential nutrients such as carbohydrates, protein and sources of vitamins. The study took place on Mount Ida, at the Minoan villa of Zominthos.

== Features ==
The Psiloritis is located on the water divide between the southern part of Crete, which drains to the Libyan Sea, and the northern basin facing the Aegean Sea. A saddle at 2,321 m East of the summit connects it with Mount Agathias, while westwards the ridge continues with Mount Stolistra (2,336 m)

The Skinakas Observatory of the University of Crete is located on the secondary peak of Skinakas at 1750 m. It has two telescopes including a 1.3 m Modified Ritchey-Chrétien instrument.

The Nida plateau is found to the east of the mountain. On the plateau are some shepherd's huts (mitata) built only of local stones, and used both for shelter and for cheesemaking. On the northeast of the mountain, beneath Skinakas Peak, the site of the observatory, is Vromonero Plateau, the site of a holly and maple grove, with many endemic and endangered species. It, along with the access road through Halasia Gorge, and the starting point at Krousonas, has been defined as a Natura 2000 protected area (Note: Krousonas – Vromonero Idis, ID GR4310009. Natura 2000 Viewer)

Zominthos is a plateau that is located in the northern foothills of Mount Ida. On the plateau is the highest altitude Minoan villa ever found, the Minoan villa of Zominthos.

Kamares cave was used as a cave sanctuary in ancient times. The Minoan pottery known as Kamares ware was named after the cave, where some of the first examples were found.

== Mythology ==
=== Dactyls ===
Ida is the locus for a race of legendary ancient metal workers, the Dactyls.

=== Idaean Cave ===
In ancient times the Idaean cave, "cave of the Goddess" (Dea) was venerated by Minoans and Hellenes alike. By Greek times the cave was rededicated to Zeus. The cave where Zeus was nurtured is variously stated to be this cave, another of the same name, or the Dictaean cave.

Votive seals and ivories have been found in the cave. Like the Dictaean cave, the Idaean cave was known as a place of initiations. It may have served as the site of an oracle, symbolized by the frequent depiction of a tripod on coins of nearby Axos, which presumably controlled the territory around the cave.

=== The Old Man of Crete ===
In Inferno XIV, Dante visualizes an old man within Mt. Ida. His head was of gold, his arms and breasts of silver, his lower abdomen brass, and below that he was of iron except that his right foot was of baked clay, upon which all his weight bore. This symbolized the decay of the world, and his tears formed the rivers of Hell: Acheron, Styx, Lethe, and Phlegethon, and Cocytus.

== Gallery ==
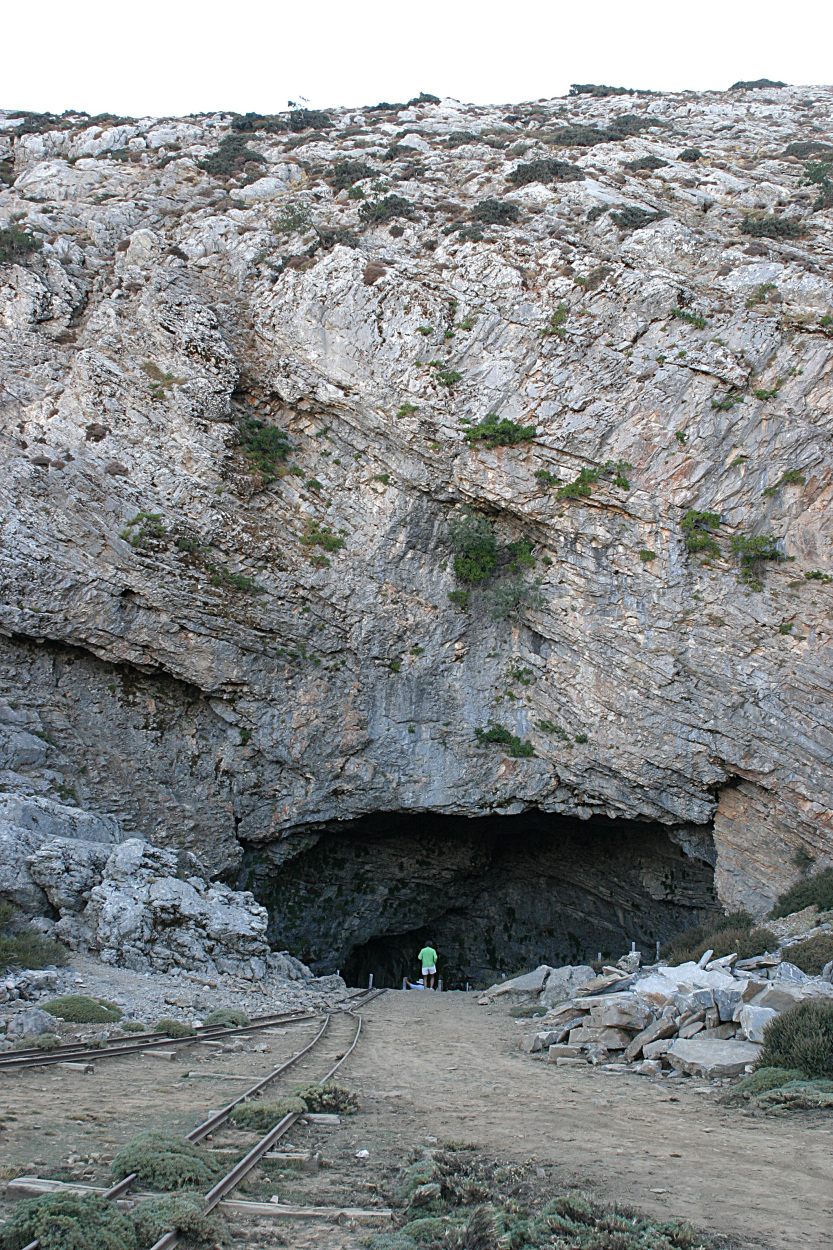
Mouth of the Idaean Cave

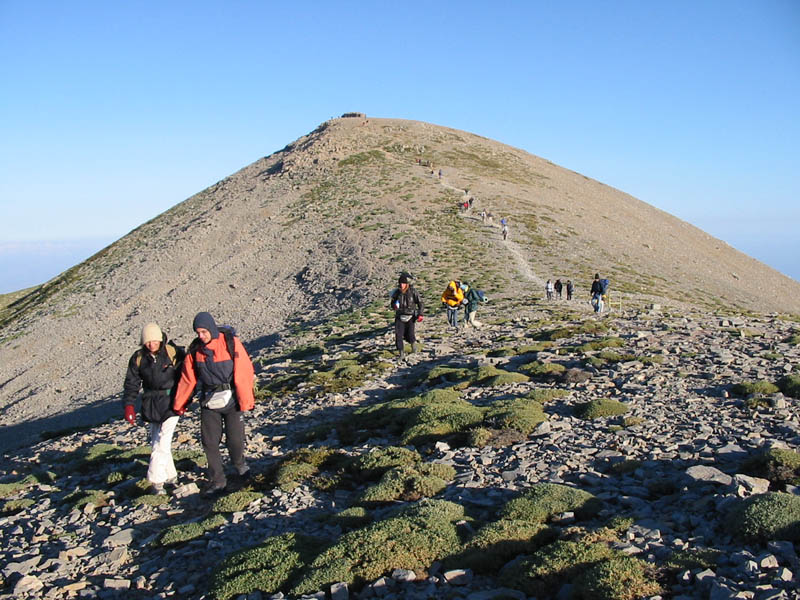
Eastern ridge of the summit of Mount Ida.

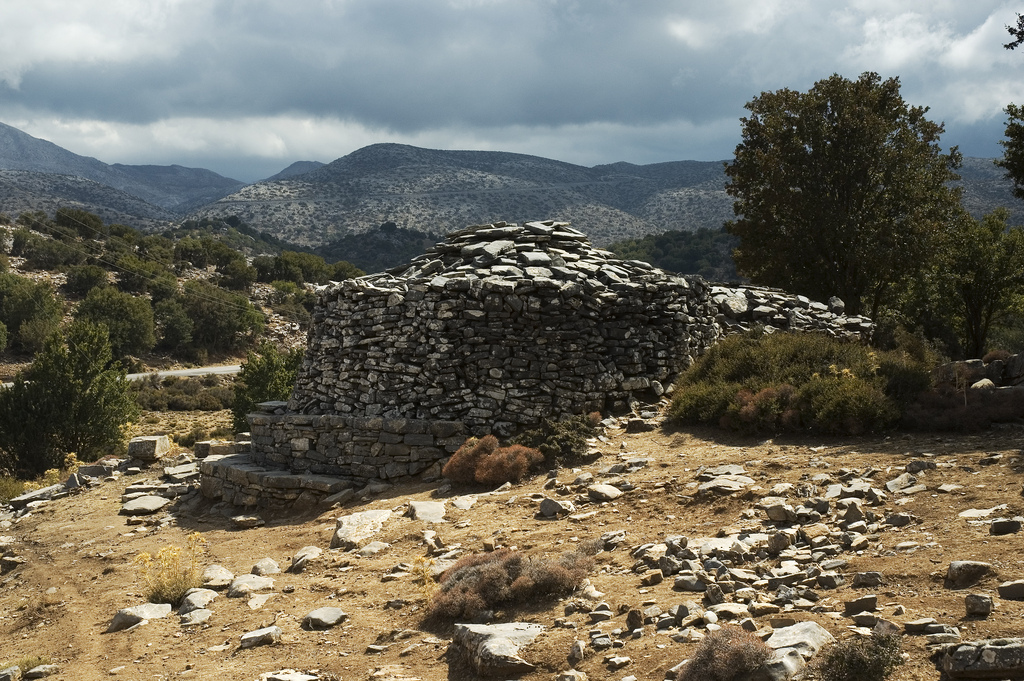
Shepherd's hut (mitato) on Nida Plateau, eastern side of Mt Ida

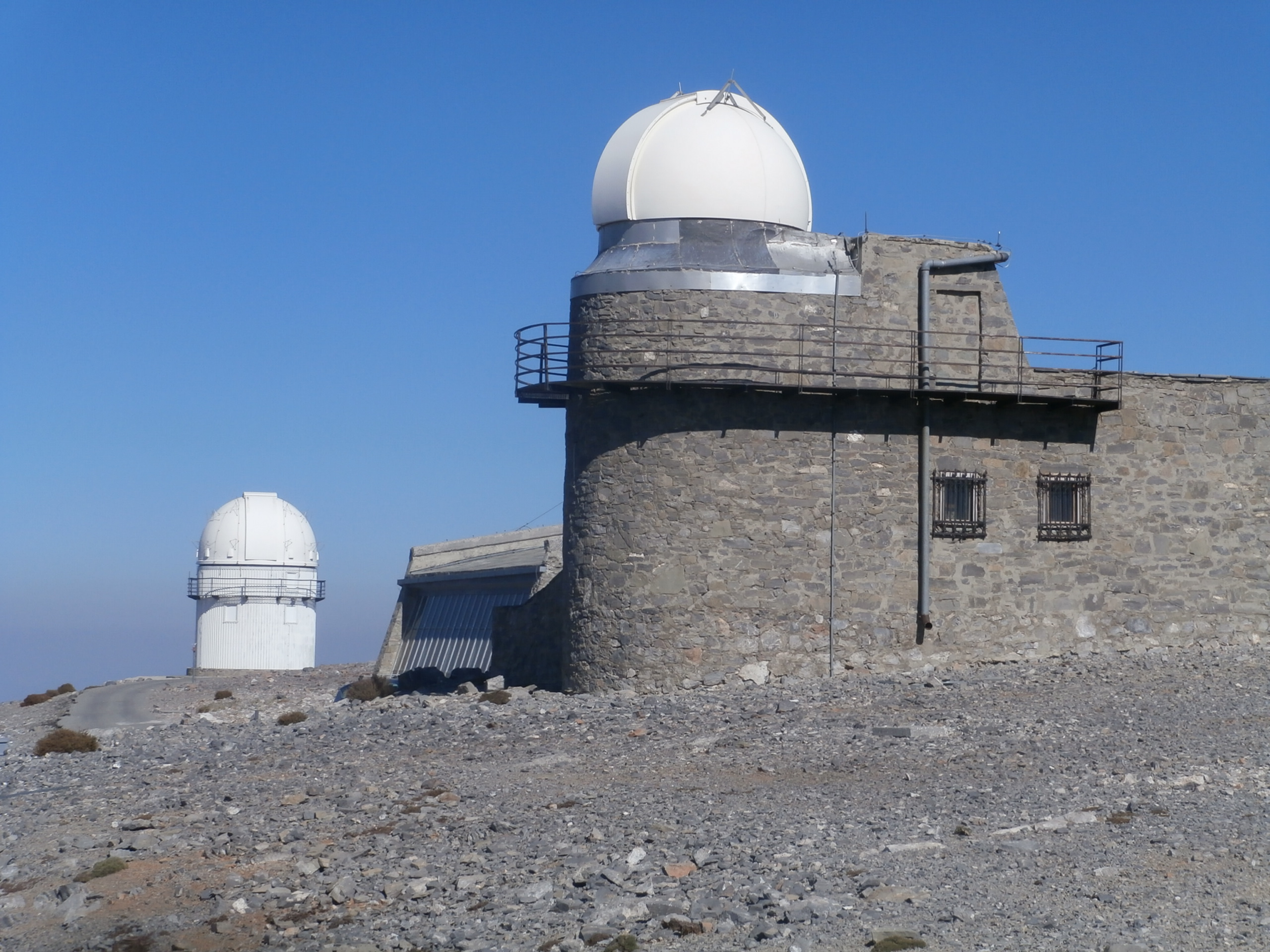
Skinakas Observatory

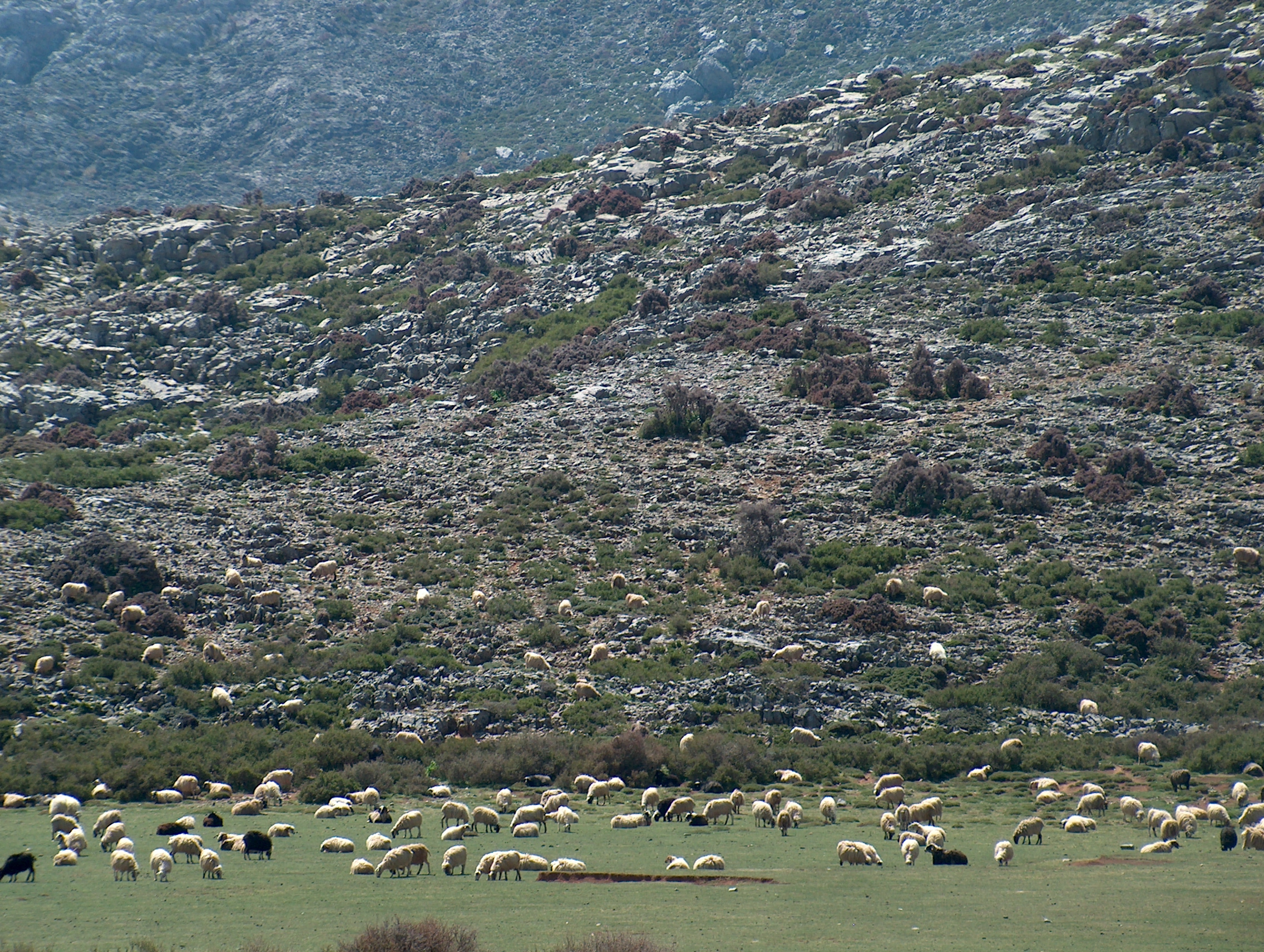
Near Anogeia

== See also ==
- Idaea
- Mount Kedros
- List of mountains in Greece
