= Kamares ware =

Minoan pottery produced in Crete

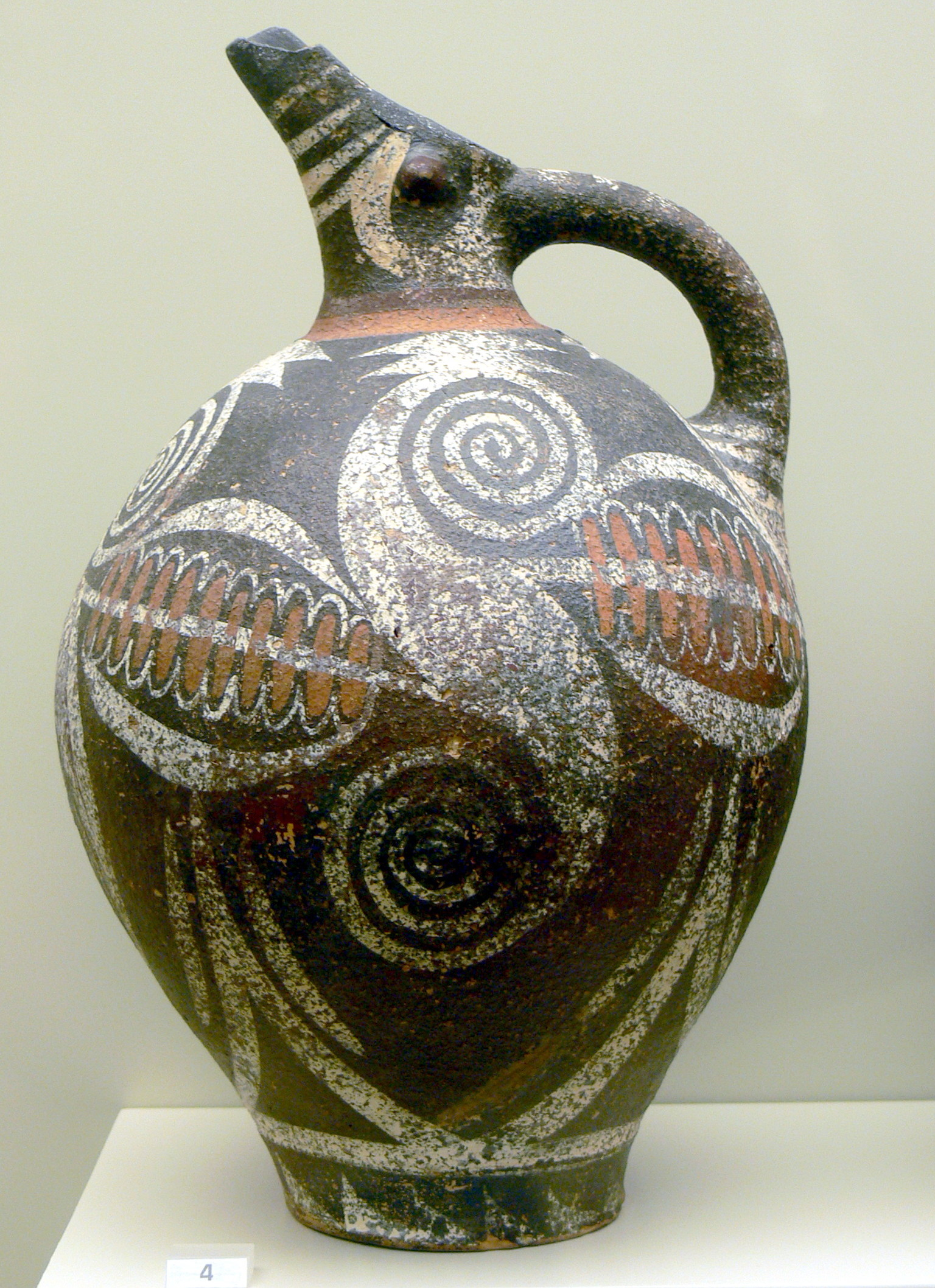
Kamares ware jug, Protopalatial period (2100-1700 BCE). Heraklion Archaeological Museum, Crete

Kamares ware is a distinctive style of Minoan pottery produced by the Minoans in Crete. It is recognizable by its light-on-dark decoration, with white, red, and orange abstract motifs painted over a black background. A prestige style that required high level craftsmanship, it is suspected to have been used as elite tableware. The finest pieces are so thin they are known as "eggshell ware".

The style first appeared during the Middle Minoan IA period (c. 2100 BCE) and remained an active part of Minoan culture until the Late Minoan IA period (c. 1450 BCE). Though manufactured in Crete, Kamares pottery was traded across the Aegean and eastern Mediterranean, and has been found as far away as the Levant and Egypt.

== Description ==
Kamares ware is characterized by its use of light-on-dark decoration. Such pots are typically decorated with combinations of abstract curvilinear designs and stylized plant and marine motifs which are painted in white and of red, orange, and yellow over the black background. Surviving examples include ridged cups, small, round spouted jars, and pithoi.

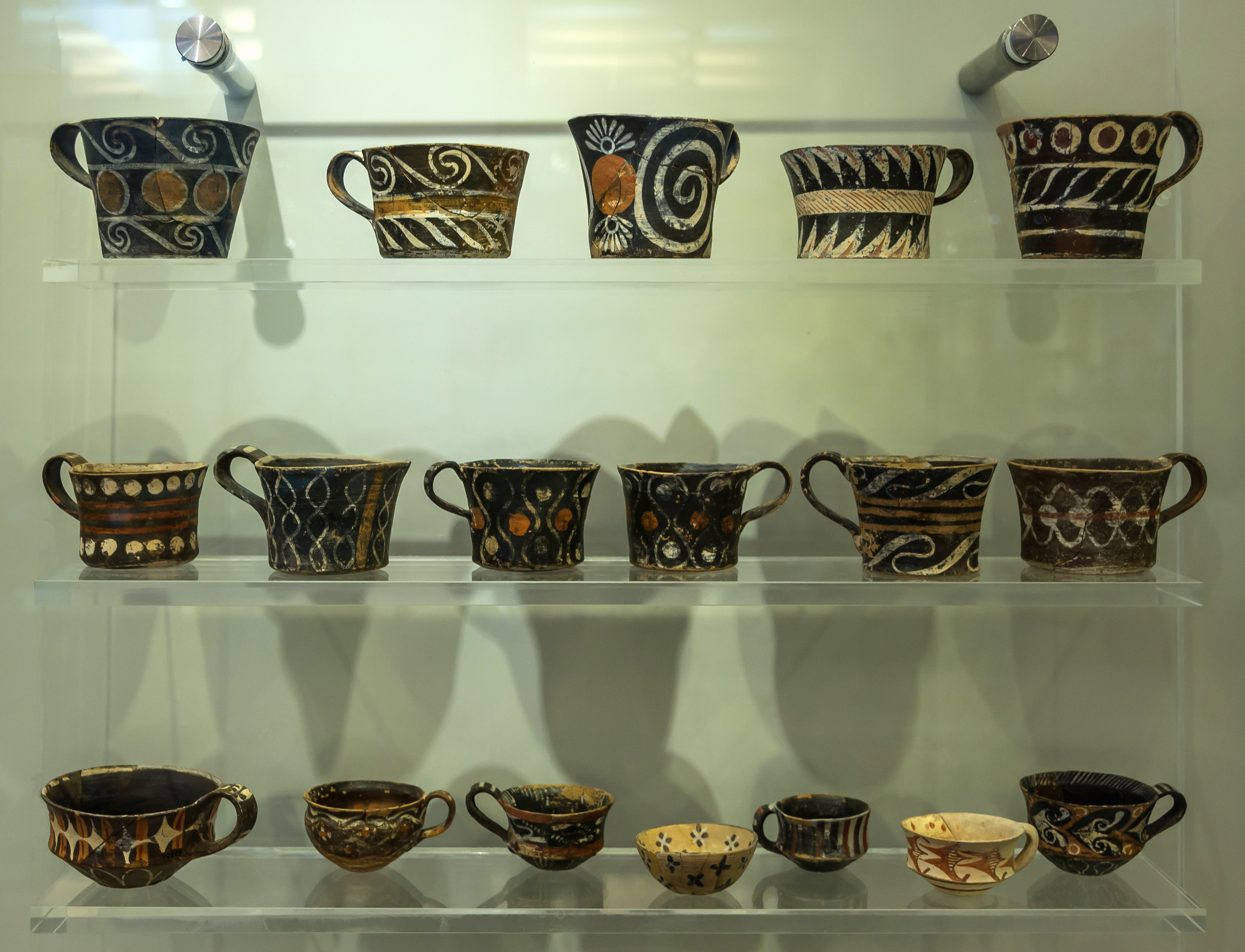
Cups from Phaistos, 1800 - 1700 BCE. Heraklion Archaeological Museum, Crete

== Historical development ==
=== Middle Minoan IA ===
The earliest known Kamares ware pottery was made during the Middle Minoan IA period (c. 2100-1925 BCE). In this era, the style already made use of polychromy. Examples from this period have been found at Mochlos and Vasiliki in eastern Crete, at Patrikies in the Messara Plain, as well as in the West Court of the palace at Knossos.

=== Middle Minoan IB ===
During the Middle Minoan IB period (c. 1925-1875 BCE), the Minoans adopted the potter's wheel. Kamares pots from this period are characterized by increasingly thinner walls, and are using more complex polychrome decorations. Some features suggest that it was designed to appear similar to metalwork.

Kamares sherds from roughly this period have been found at El-Lisht in Egypt, near the pyramid of Amenemhat I. Amenemhat I belonged to the Twelfth Dynasty of Egypt.

=== Middle Minoan II ===
Most of the Middle Minoan II (c. 1875–1750 BCE) examples of Kamares ware are found at the Minoan palaces of Knossos, Phaistos, and Malia, showing it was likely a high-prestige ware. These pots are also known as eggshell ware, because of their thinness and delicacy. This period marked the first representations of stylized plants and animals in Kamares pottery, which had previously been limited to abstract motifs.

=== Middle Minoan III ===
Middle Minoan (c. 1750–1700 BCE) marks the beginning of Neopalatial Crete, time of change following the destruction and rebuilding of the palaces. While high quality pottery is still being produced in abundance, decoration was no longer a priority. Thus, examples from this era are sometimes known as Post-Kamares.

During the Neopalatial period, Minoan influence expanded throughout the southern Aegean and Egypt. As a result of this cultural exchange, Neopalatial Kamares ware has been excavated in Egypt, including both imported examples and locally made imitations.

== Gallery ==
Gallery of pieces from Heraklion Archaeological Museum, Crete.

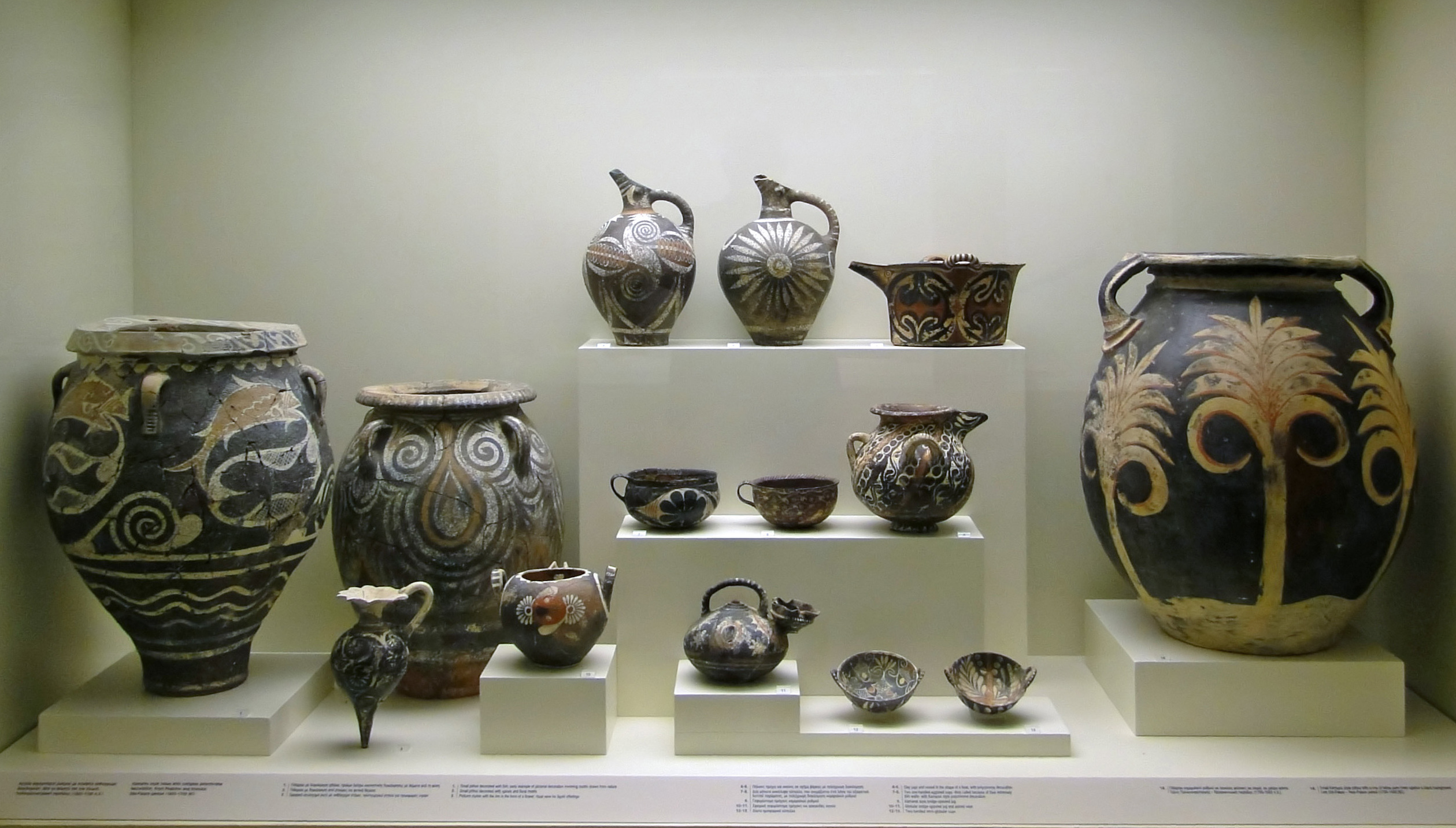
Kamares vases in Heraklion Archaeological Museum, Crete

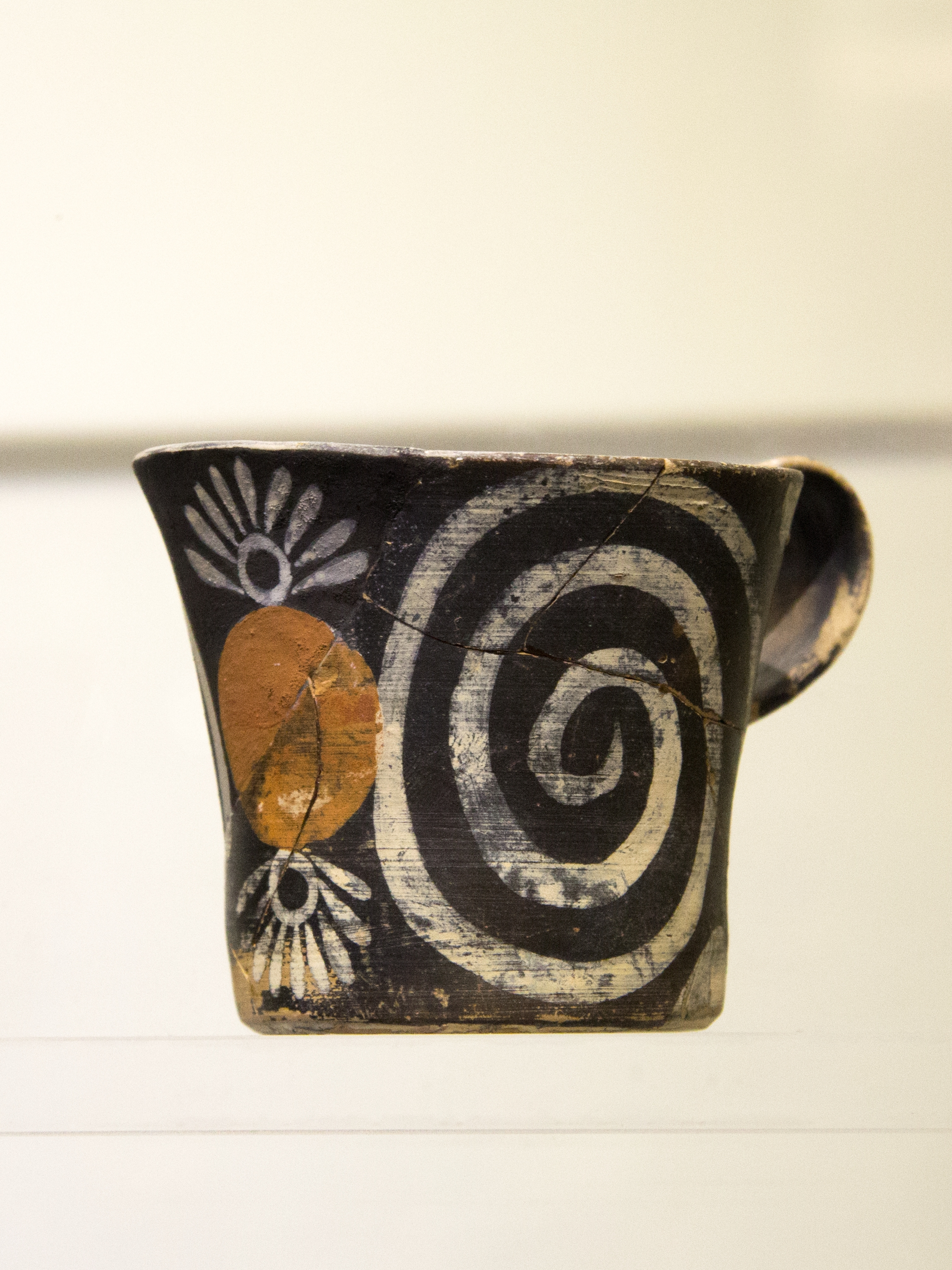
White and polychrome cup from Phaistos, 1800-1700 BC. Heraklion Archaeological Museum

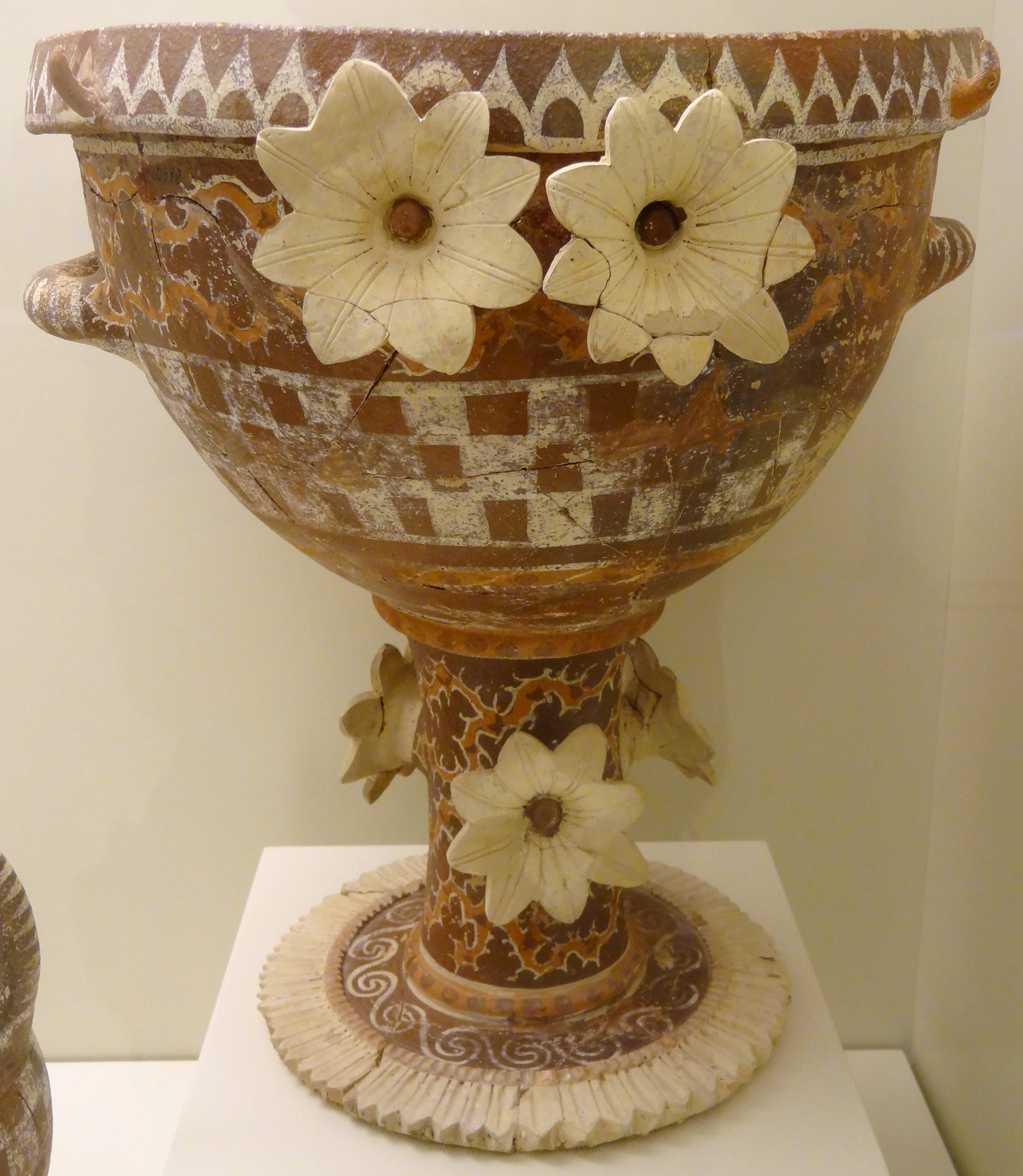
Krater from Phaistos, 1900-1700 BCE, Heraklion Archaeological Museum

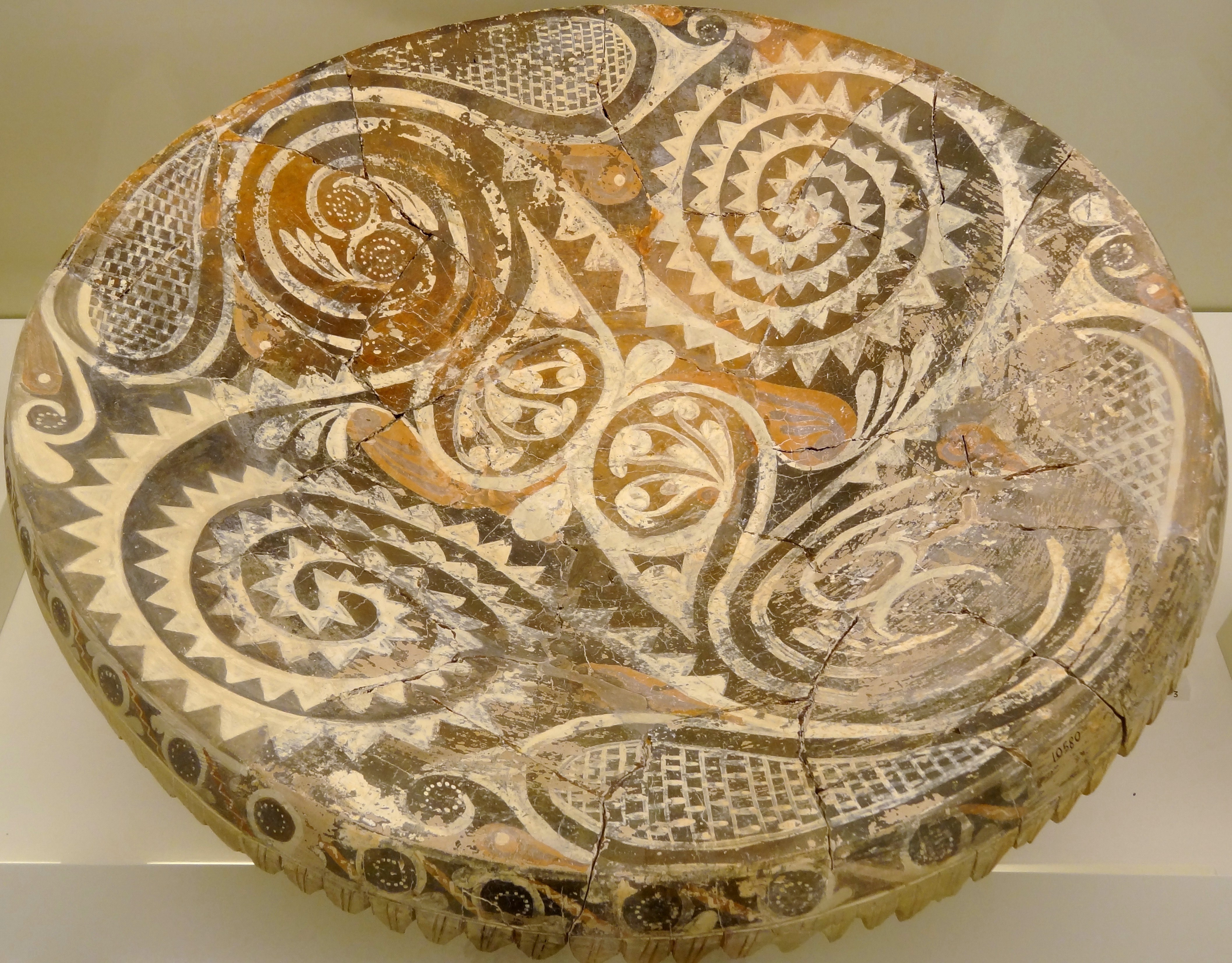
Polychrome dish from Phaistos, Old Palace period (1800-1700 BCE). Heraklion Archaeological Museum

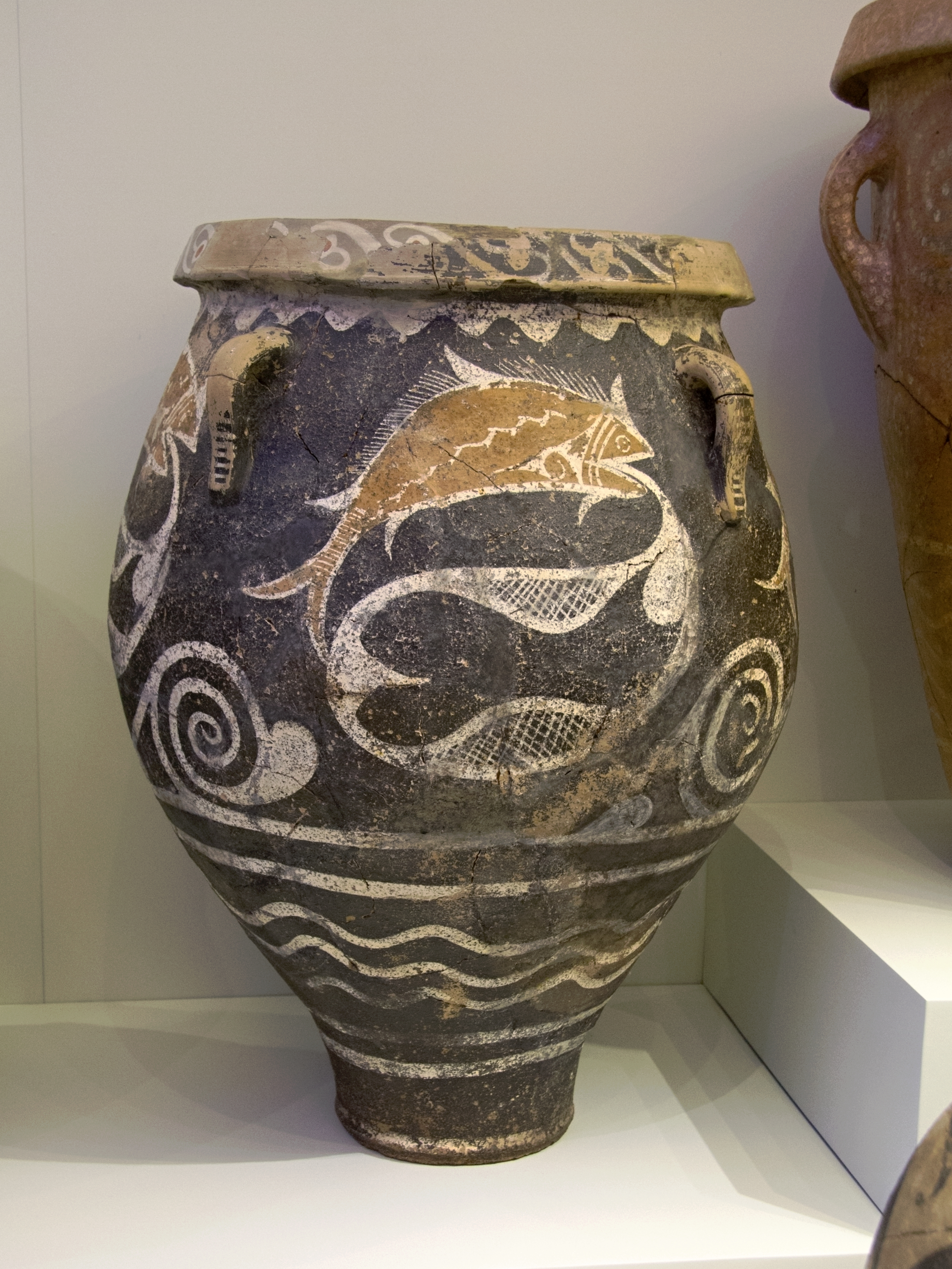
Pithos with fish in a net, Phaistos (1800-1700 BCE). Heraklion Archaeological Museum

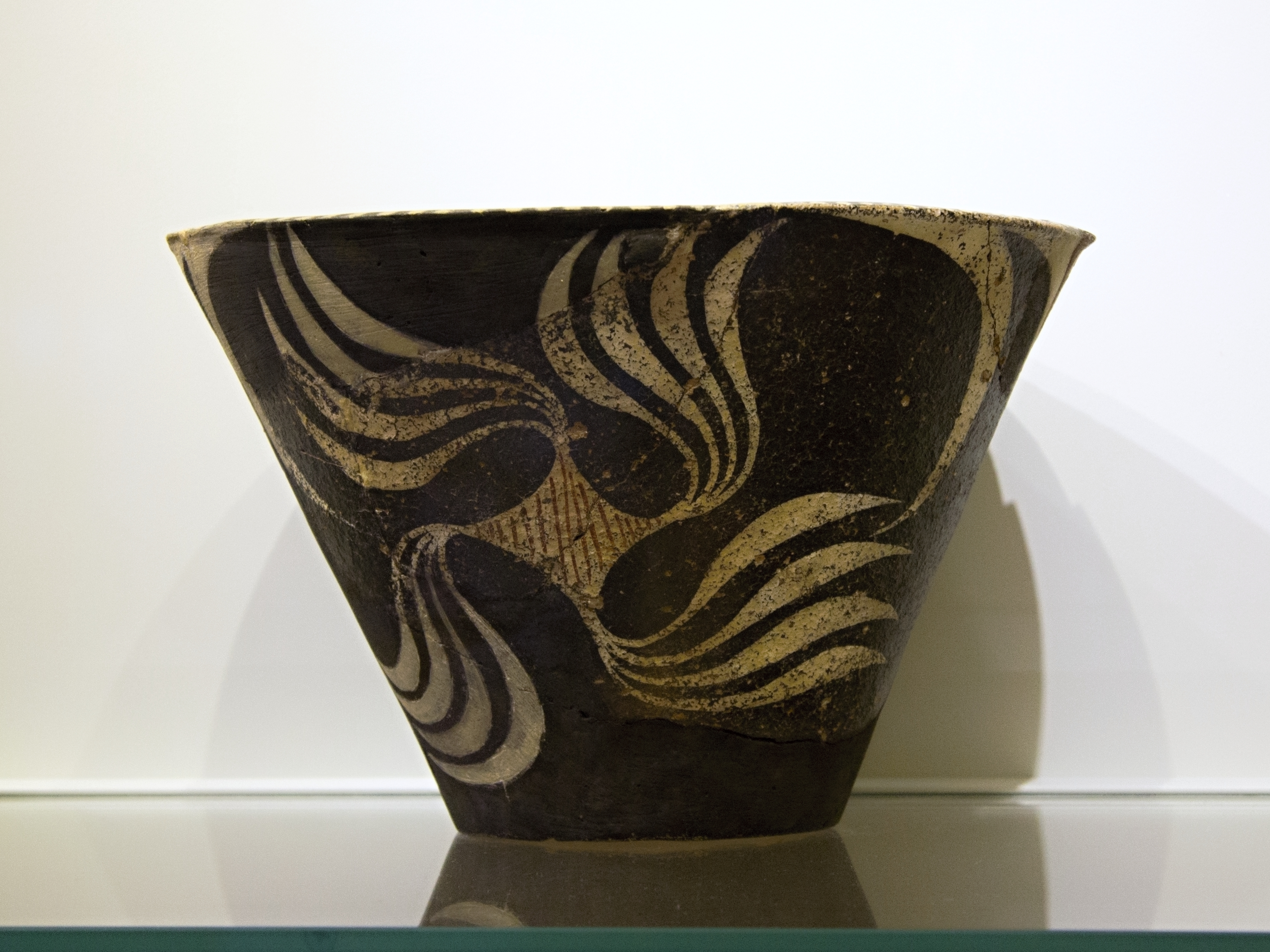
Vessel from Phaistos (1800-1700 BCE). Heraklion Archaeological Museum, Crete

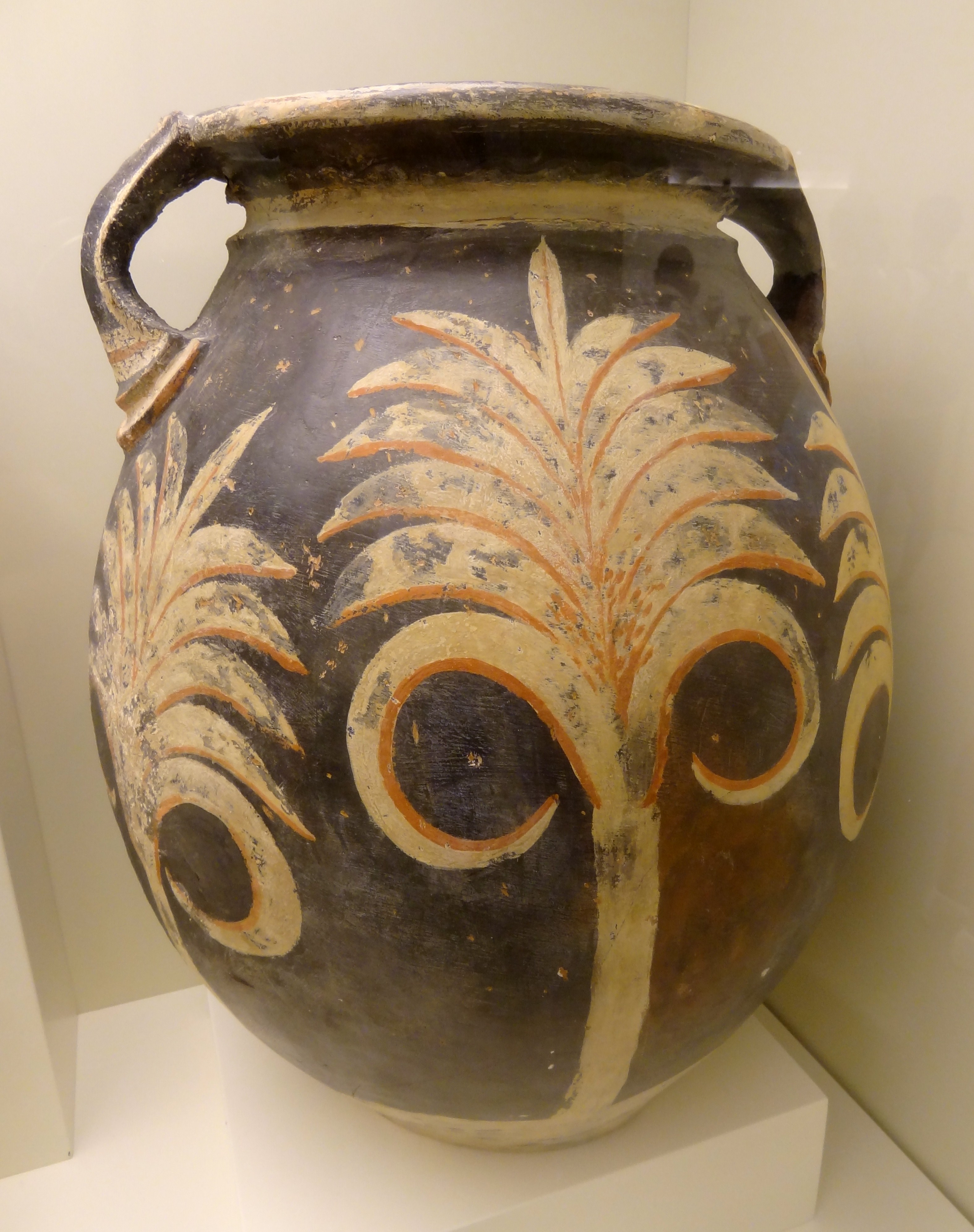
Pithos with white palm trees on a black background (1700-1650 BCE). Heraklion Archaeological Museum, Crete

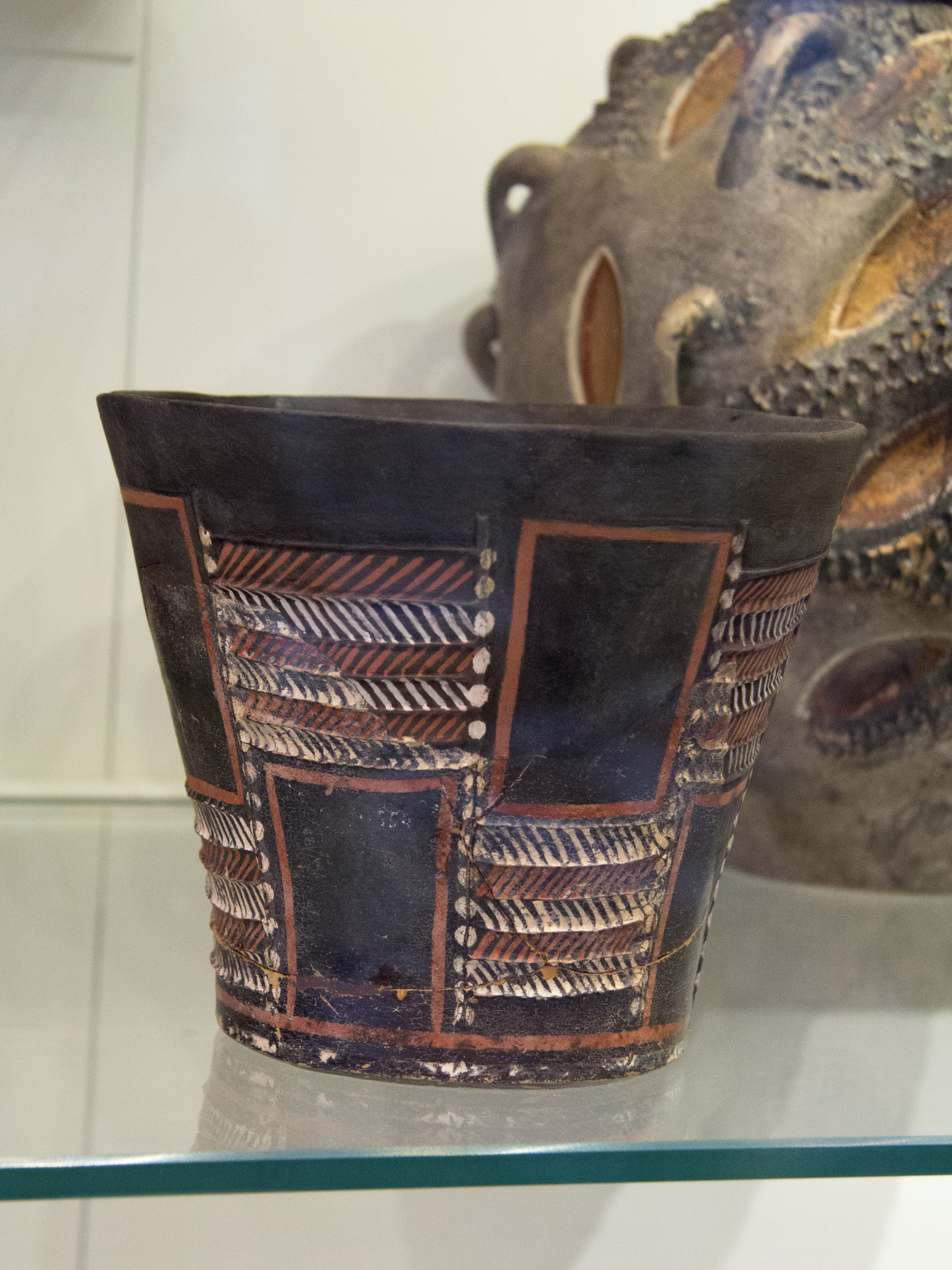
Kamares pottery, Heraklion Archaeological Museum, Crete (photo by Zde).

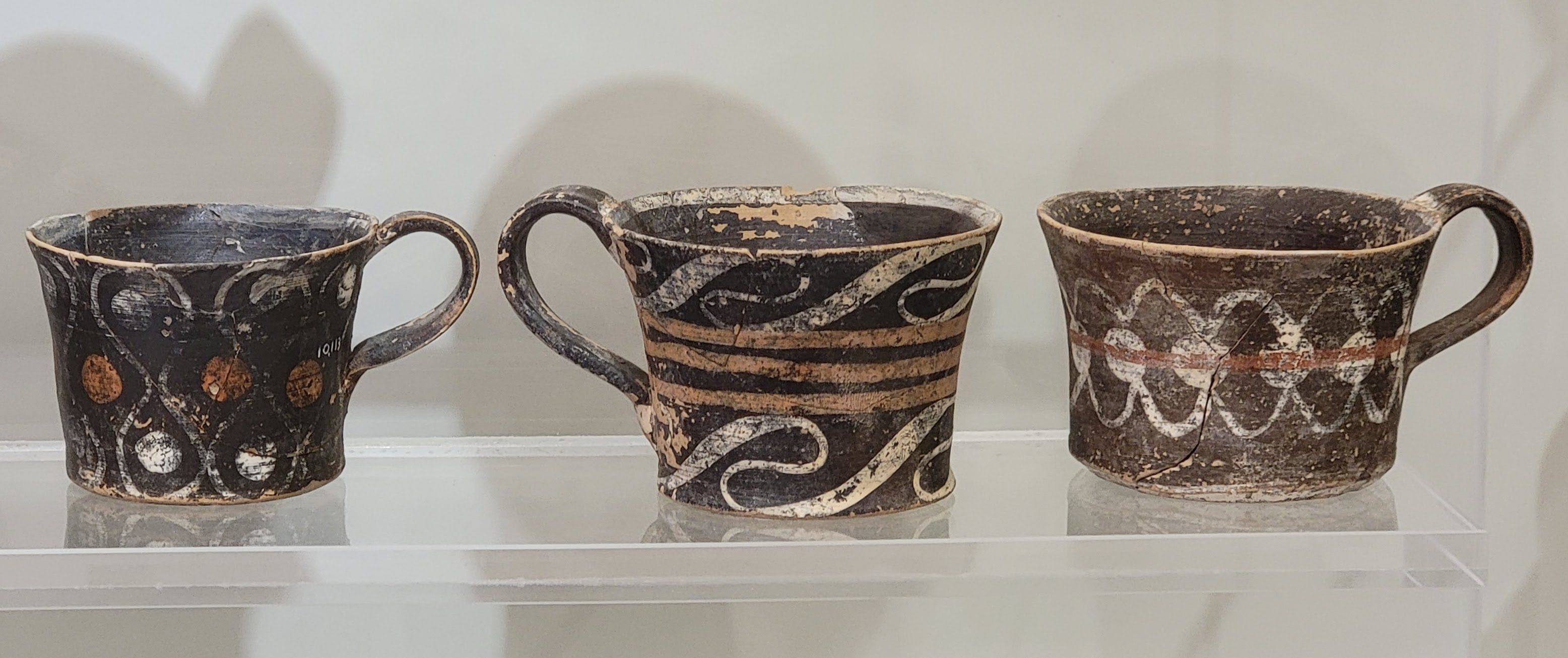
Cups (1800-1700 BCE) from the Heraklion Archaeological Museum, Crete

== See also ==
- Minoan art
- Malia (archaeological site)
