= Pote Tha Kanei Xasteria =

Song

Pote Tha Kani Xasteria or simply Xasteria, (Greek: Πότε θα κάνει ξαστεριά, lit. 'When will the night sky be clear and starlit') is a Greek traditional song, and specifically a Cretan rizitiko song.

== Rizitika ==
Rizitika songs are the oldest type of Cretan music. They mainly originate in western Crete, but are also widespread in central and eastern Crete. Rizes (ρίζες, lit. 'roots') are the foothills of the mountains. One view says that from the roots of the mountains those songs took their name, from Ida, Dikti and the White Mountains. Another view argues that "the songs of the roots" of the ancestors, were called by the people Rizitika. Today, Rizitika considered all those songs of unknown artists that came to our day through tradition from past centuries.

Rizitika songs commonly have no conventional names, and are instead referred to by with their first verse, or with some other verse. Rizitika are generally not danced, and additionally they are traditionally divided into songs της τάβλας ('of the table') and της στράτας ('of the road'). The author Idomeneas Papageorgiorakis, in his book Τα Κρητικά ριζίτικα τραγούδια, classified them in 32 melodies, and found 31 songs to have their own unique melodies, always on major scales. Their music is serious, typically a singer first sings a verse, which is usually repeated chorally. This does not always happen, however. The songs do not always need to rhyme, and the verse does not always have fifteen syllables.

== Identity of the song ==
Tune

The origin of Xasteria is not clear, and the views of historians and musicologists differ. Other historians place it in the years of Ottoman rule, and others in Venetian rule, or even in the era of the Byzantine Empire. An older similar song with the following lyrics is known:

Χριστέ νά ζώνουμουν σπαθί καί νάπιανα κοντάρι

νά πρόβαινα στόν Ὁμαλό στή στράτα τῷ Μουσούρω,

νά σύρω τ' ἀργυρό σπαθί καί τό χρυσό κοντάρι

νά κάμω μάνες δίχως γιούς, γυναῖκες δίχως ἄντρες.

"Jesus, if I would put on a sword and grab a stick,

to go to Omalos, on the road of the Mousouroi,

to pull out the silver sword and the golden stick

and make mothers without sons, women without husbands."

The references to the "sword" and the "stick" refer to the Acritic circle. The Mousouroi were an aristocratic family of Crete, originating from the Byzantine Empire. "Road of the Mousouroi" is the road that leads from the village of Lakkoi to Omalos, where the Mousouroi lived. The reason for writing the song, according to many, was the way the Mousouroi treated the people of the area. Others believe that these verses refer to a feud of the time, in which the Mousouroi were involved.

Over time, the lyrics became:

Πότε θά κάμει ξαστεριά, πότε θά φλεβαρίσει

νά πάρω τό τουφέκι μου τήν ὄμορφη πατρώνα

νά κατεβῶ στόν Ὁμαλό, στή στράτα τῶν Μουσούρω,

νά κάμω μάνες, δίχως γιους, γυναῖκες δίχως ἄντρες

νά κάμω καί μωρά παιδιά νά κλαῖν δίχως μανᾶδες,

νά κλαῖν' τή νύχτα γιά νερό καί τό πρωί γιά γάλα

"When the skies will be clear, when February will be here,

to take my rifle, the beautiful bullet,

to go to Omalos, to the road of the Mousouroi,

to make mothers without sons, women without husbands,

also have baby children, to cry without mothers,

cry in night for water and the morning for milk."

== Covers ==
Although in the beginning the song was known and used only in the frequent Cretan revolts, such as Arkadi and Therissos, after Crete was annexed by Greece in 1913 it began to be used nationwide, in various occasions, from World War II until the Athens Polytechnic uprising. A Cypriot variant has been written, which is performed at events of the University of Cyprus, which instead of Omalos mentions Cypriot toponyms (Olympus, Kyrenia, Morphou, Messaria, Karpasia). Its cover by Nikos Xylouris is also known.
