= Xylouris White =

Musical duo of George Xylouris and Jim White

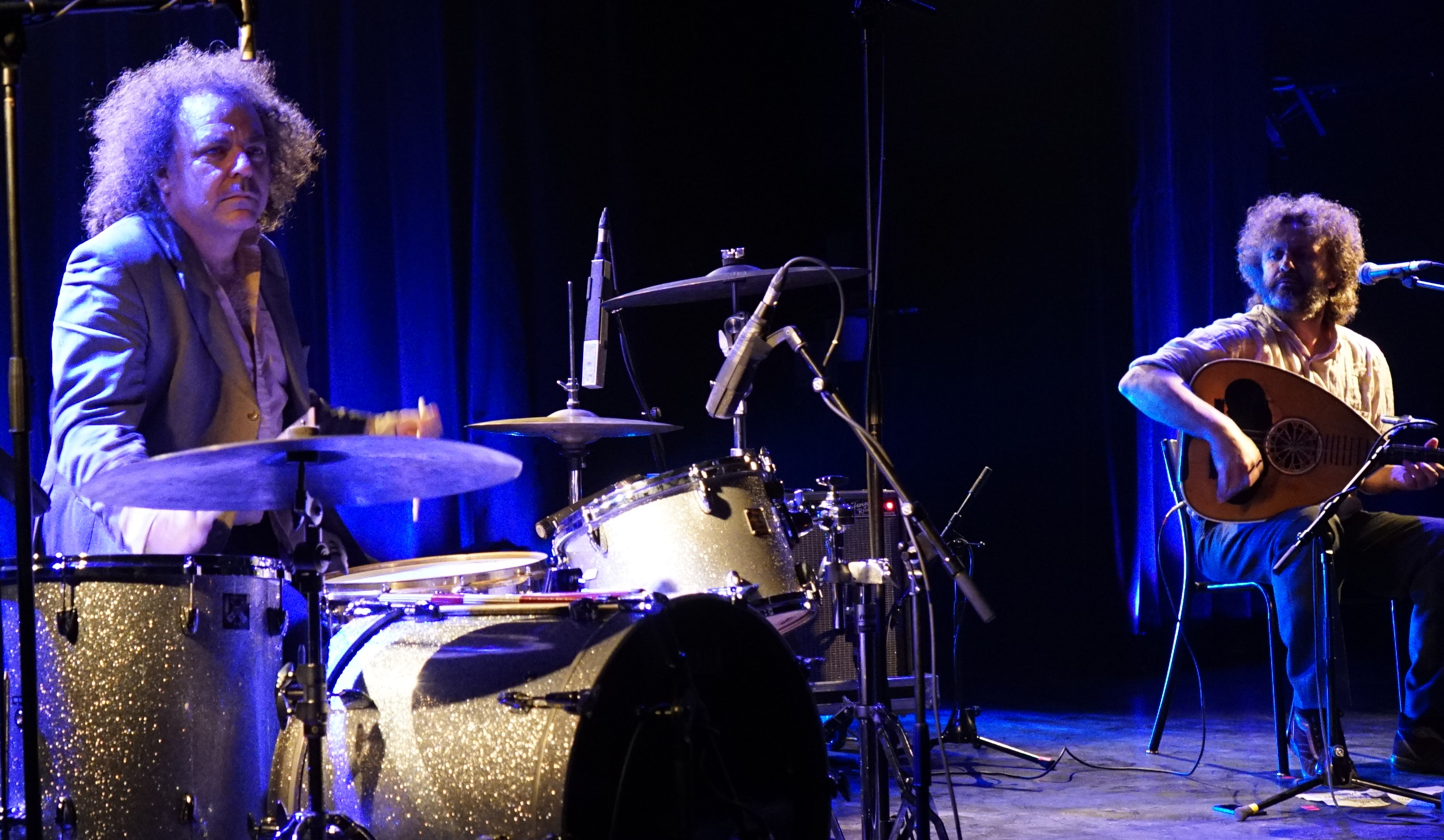

Background information
- Genres: Jazz, post-rock, Greek
- Years active: 2013–present
- Labels: Bella Union, ABC Music
- Members: George Xylouris; Jim White; Guy Picciotto
- Website: www.xylouriswhite.com

Xylouris White is a musical collaboration established in 2013, involving Greek singer and laouto player George Xylouris and Australian drummer Jim White, best known for his work with Dirty Three. The duo's music has been described as combining "free-jazz, avant-rock and ages-old Greek folk traditions." To date they have released three albums, and undertaken multiple world tours.

== History ==
The two musicians first met in Melbourne in 1990, when Xylouris was touring with his father, Antonis Xylouris, and became friends. White first played with Xylouris' family band in Australia in 2009. They began recording and performing regularly in public together in New York City in late 2013. They released their first album, Goats, in 2014; it topped the Billboard World Music chart.

They performed together at the Sydney Festival in 2015, in advance of a world tour, and released their second album, Black Peak, on Bella Union, in 2016.

Their third album, Mother, was released early in 2018.

Each of their albums have been produced by Guy Picciotto (Fugazi). Guy's Role is so involved he is considered a 'non-performing' member of the band.

== Discography ==
=== Albums ===
Title	Details	Peak positions
Title	Details	AUS
Goats	Released: 2014; Label: Other Music Recording Co. (OM-015-2); Formats: CD, digital	—
Black Peak	Released: October 2016; Label: Bella Union (BELLA570); Formats: CD, LP, digital	—
Mother	Released: January 2018; Label: Bella Union (BELLA716); Formats: CD, LP, digital	—
The Sisypheans	Released: 2019; Label: Drag City (DC758); Formats: CD, LP, digital	—
Live at Columbus Theatre 2013	Released: March 2021; Label: Xylouris White; Formats: digital	—
The Forest in Me	Released: April 2023; Label: Drag City (DC867); Formats: CD, LP, digital	—

== Awards and nominations ==
=== ARIA Music Awards ===
The ARIA Music Awards is an annual awards ceremony that recognises excellence, innovation, and achievement across all genres of Australian music. They commenced in 1987.

Year	Nominee / work	Award	Result	Ref.
2017	Black Peak	Best World Music Album	Nominated	
2018	Mother	Best World Music Album	Nominated	
2020	The Sisypheans	Best World Music Album	Nominated	

=== Music Victoria Awards ===
The Music Victoria Awards are an annual awards night celebrating Victorian music. They commenced in 2006.

Year	Nominee / work	Award	Result	Ref.
2018	Xylouris White	Best Global Act	Nominated	
