= Xylouris =

Xylouris, Xilouris is a Greek surname Ξυλούρης. Notable people with the surname include:

- Giorgos Xylouris (born 1965), Greek musician
- Nikos Xylouris (1936–1980), Greek composer
- Nikos Xylouris (swimmer) (born 1982), Greek swimmer
