= Sasmos =

- Genre: Drama
- Based on: Sasmos by Spyros Petroulakis
- Written by: Vasilis Spiliopoulos; Emmanouela Alexiou
- Directed by: Kostas Kopstopoulos (1-2 season); Zoi Filippa (3 season); Giannis Sampanis (3 season); Kostas Anagnostopoulos (3 season)
- Starring: Orfeas Avgoustidis; Christina Cheila-Fameli; Maria Tzompanaki; Dimitris Lalos; Maria Protopappa
- Theme music composer: Stavros Xarchakos
- Opening theme: Chameni Agapi by Nikos Xilouris
- Country of origin: Greece
- Original language: Greek
- No. of seasons: 3
- No. of episodes: 496

Production
- Executive producer: J.K. Productions S.A. - Karagiannis
- Production locations: Rethymno, Greece; Athens, Greece
- Running time: 55-88 minutes

Original release
- Network: Alpha TV
- Release: September 6, 2021 – July 8, 2024

Sasmos (English: Reconciliation) is the title of a Greek drama television series, broadcast by Alpha TV from September 6, 2021 to July 8, 2024.

Starred by Orfeas Avgoustidis, Christina Cheila-Fameli, Maria Tzompanaki, Dimitris Lalos and Maria Protopappa. The series is based on the novel of the same name by Spyros Petroulakis, published by "Minoas" publications in 2019.

== Series overview ==
Season	Episodes	Originally aired	
Season	Episodes	First aired	Last aired
1	171	September 6, 2021	July 6, 2022
2	173	September 19, 2022	July 13, 2023
3	152	September 25, 2023	July 8, 2024

== Plot ==
Twenty years ago, Vasilis Stamatakis shoots and murders Markos Vroulakis in front of his children. Markos' daughter, Argyro, who was present at her father's murder, is shocked and loses her speech for a long time. In order to forget the event, she leaves with her relatives and settles permanently in Australia. However, she decides to return to her hometown to see her own people. She meets Asteris Stamatakis, the son of her father's murderer, at an airport, and without knowing each other, they form a romantic relationship. The plot of the series evolves between the vendetta between the Stamatakis and Vroulakis, but also the hatred that she carries and the love of the two young people that will act as a catalyst for the reconciliation, the rapprochement of the two families.

== Cast ==
- Orfeas Avgoustidis as Asteris Stamatakis
- Christina Cheila-Fameli as Argyro Vroulaki
- Maria Tzompanaki as Kalliopi Stamataki
- Dimitris Lalos as Mathios Stamatakis
- Maria Protopappa as Marina Vroulaki
- Dimitris Imellos as Antonia Fragkiadakis
- Tasos Nousias as Stefanis Stamatakis
- Marilita Lampropoulou as Vasiliki Kastrinaki-Stamataki
- Evgenia Samara as Stella Kamariotaki
- Danai Pappa as Thodora Aggelaki
- Michalis Aerakis as Pater Michalis
- Kostas Nikouli as Petros Vroulakis
- Olga Damani as Eirini Vroulaki
- Stelios Mainas as Pavlos Vroulakis
- Giota Festa as Aimilia Marathaki
- Giorgos Gerontidakis as Giorgos Vidalis/Lefteris Orfanos
- Dimitris Alexandris as Efthimis Farmakis
- Vasilis Mpismpikis as Antreas Vroulakis
- Giorgos Amoutzas as Nikiforos Stamatakis
- Alina Kotsovoulou as Anna Aggelaki
- Stahis Mantzoros as Pantelis Aggelakis
