= The King (2002 film) =

The King Ο Βασιλιάς
- Directed by: Nikos Grammatikos
- Written by: Nikos Grammatikos; Nikos Panayotopoulos
- Starring: Vangelis Mourikis; Marilita Lambropoulou; Minas Hatzisavvas
- Cinematography: Giannis Daskalothanasis
- Edited by: Yannis Sakaridis
- Music by: Thanasis Papakonstantinou
- Release date: November 10, 2002
- Running time: 130 minutes
- Country: Greece
- Language: Greek

The King (Greek: Ο Βασιλιάς/O Vasilias) is a Greek drama film directed by Nikos Grammatikos. The film released in 2002 and stars Vangelis Mourikis, Marilita Lambropoulou and Minas Hatzisavvas. It won the Golden Piramide in 2003 Cairo International Film Festival as well as four awards in Greek State Film Awards.

== Plot ==
A young man, recently released from prison, returns to his childhood hometown in order to escape from his recent criminal past. There, he is confronted with suspicion and hostility by local people, including the community leader. The only friendly person is the policeman. After his former girlfriend arrives, his past catches up with him and conflict with locals goes to extremes.

== Cast ==
- Vangelis Mourikis
- Marilita Lambropoulou
- Minas Hatzisavvas
- Babis Giotopoulos
- Vivi Koka
- Tasos Nousias
- Evangelia Andreadaki

== Awards ==
List of awards and nominations
Award	Category	Recipients and nominees	Result
2003 Cairo International Film Festival	Golden Pyramid	Nikos Grammatikos	Won
2002 Greek State Film Awards	Third Best Film	Nikos Grammatikos	Won
2002 Greek State Film Awards	Best Actor	Vangelis Mourikis	Won
2002 Greek State Film Awards	Best Set Decoration	Aglaia Zoiopoulou	Won
2002 Greek State Film Awards	Best Sound	Antonis Samaras	Won
