= Music of Crete =

Traditional forms of musical culture in Crete

The music of Crete (Greek: Κρητική μουσική, Kritikí mousikí), also called Kritika (κρητικά), is the Greek folk music prevalent on the island of Crete in Greece. Cretan traditional music includes instrumental music (generally also involving singing), a capella songs known as the rizitika, "Erotokritos," Cretan urban songs (tabachaniotika), as well as other miscellaneous songs and folk genres (lullabies, ritual laments, etc.).

Historically, there have been significant variations in the music across the island (more violin than lyra in far Eastern and Western Crete, a preference for the syrtos in Western Crete and kondylies in Eastern Crete). Some of this variation continues today and in the late-twentieth and early-twenty-first centuries has received greater attention by scholars and the mass media. Nonetheless, over the course of the twentieth-century, the sense of a single, island-wide Cretan musical tradition emerged.

Although much Cretan music remains close to its folk roots and an integral part of the fabric of many Cretans' everyday lives, it is also constantly evolving, alongside many professional and semi-professional musicians, many regional record companies and professional distributors, professional luthiers (especially of Cretan lyras and Cretan lutes), and Cretan kentra (clubs for dancing to live Cretan music).

== Categories ==
=== Instrumental (dances, kondylies, kantadha) ===
Much Cretan music includes the use of instruments (and usually singing, too). Lyra, violin, and laouto (Cretan lute) predominate, but other common instruments include the mandolin, mandola, oud, thiampoli (souravli), askomandoura, classical guitar (especially in Eastern Crete), boulgari, and daouli (davul). There is also an instrument known as the viololyra, a hybrid of the violin and lyra, which has enjoyed varying degrees of popularity at various times.

Cretan music has been largely heterophonic in texture or accompanied by drones and fifth chords on Cretan lute, classical guitar, mandolin, boulgari, and so forth. Drones are also played simultaneously on melody instruments such as the lyra and violin by bowing a second string (usually open) simultaneously as one plays the melody notes on another string. Especially in earlier and more amateur settings where a second accompanying instrument was often absent, a lyra player accompanied himself by playing not only a drone string but also with a distinctively rhythmic bowing style in order to ring the gerakokoudhouna (small "falcon bells") that were attached to his bow. It is much more common today for the lyra to be accompanied by one or more other instruments, and for lyra players to employ a violin bow.

Like much Greek folk music, Cretan music is closely related to dance, and the most common musical forms correspond directly with the Cretan dances that may accompany them, such as the Syrtos, pentozali, siganos, pidikhtos, and Sousta. Certain traditional dances from other regions of Greece, most notably kalamatianos and ballos, are also widely performed by professional Cretan musicians, usually with Cretan-composed lyrics, in musical gatherings since at least the twentieth century. Like fiddle tunes in various other traditions, Cretan dance music often involves repeated melodies or repeated pairings of melodies, whose selection and concatenation is improvised in performance.

Another musical construction common to Cretan music is the taximi (Greek: ταξίμι), a rhythmically free, improvised instrumental solo (e.g., on the violin, lyra, or lute) in a particular scale or mode preceding the dance-song proper. (Both the word taximi and the musical form itself are cognates with the Arabic taqsim.)

==== Mantinadas ====
Much Cretan music is improvisational, especially in terms of its "lyrics." Typically, the lyrics of Cretan instrumental music take the form of mantinadas (Greek: μαντινάδα): fifteen-syllable rhyming (or assonant) couplets which have their origins in medieval Cretan poetry (as rhyming couplets) as well as in earlier (non-rhyming) forms of Greek verse (in the same fifteen-syllable form).

Each line of a mantinada is divided into two hemistichs (Greek: ημιστιχί), the first of eight syllables and the second of seven, and separated by a caesura. For this reason, sometimes when mantinadas are transcribed, they are broken into four shorter lines in a rhyme scheme of ABCB as opposed to the traditional form of a couplet. The metrical rhythm of mantinadas usually falls into eight successive iambs followed by an unstressed syllable, the form known in Greek as political verse and akin to the English-language fourteener and ballad stanza. There may be slight variations in meter.

For example:

Τα κρητικά τα χώματα, όπου και αν τα σκάψεις,
αίμα παλικαριών θα βρείς, κόκαλα θα ξεθάψεις.

Ta Kritika ta chomata, opou kai an ta skapseis
Aima palikarion tha vreis, kokala tha ksethapseis.

΅Wherever you happen to dig in Cretan soil,
You will find the blood of stout-hearted men, you will unbury bones.

Mantinadas are written about a variety of subjects. Many focus on love, employ pastoral imagery, and use Cretan idiomatic Greek. Numerous folklorists since the early twentieth century have published large collections of mantinadas. Since the mid-twentieth century, some prolific mantinada composers have regionally published their mantinadas, much like other books of poetry. Some mantinadas are excerpted as stand-alone rhyming couplets from longer poems, particularly the Erotokritos, an epic poem that is a staple of Cretan Renaissance literature.

Singers, professional and amateur alike, frequently improvise in the moment which mantinadas they sing or improvise entirely new ones on the spot. Sometimes a certain pairing of a particular mantinada with a particular melody (e.g., based on a well-known professional recording) will also congeal among much of the population and therefore tend to be repeated in performance.

A common musical accompaniment for the improvisation of large numbers of mantinadas is called a kontilia (Greek: κοντυλιά), a four-measure melody. The same kontilia (or a traditional pairing of kontylies) can be repeated for virtually any length of time, but musicians can also improvise changes in which kontylia is being played, stringing together different kontylies over the course of a performance.

There is also a tradition of the kantadha (serenade) in Crete in which mantinadas are sung and improvised. The music of a kantadha may be kondylies or structured like the music of a syrtos (the dance form) but not actually intended for dancing or even necessarily sung at a tempo appropriate for dancing.

=== A Cappella singing (Rizitika) ===
There is also a strong a cappella tradition of mountain songs known as rizitika. The rizitika are conventionally divided into rizitika "of the road" (tis stratas) and rizitika "of the table" (tis tavlas). Since the twentieth century, an island-wide canon of rizitika songs has taken shape, especially in the wake of a commercially influential recording of them arranged by Yannis Markopoulos and sung by Nikos Xylouris in the early 1970s. Folklorists and other scholars have also published large collections of rizitika song texts. (For example, Rizitika: Dimotika Tragoudia tis Kritis by Stamatis Apostolakis.)

=== Erotokritos ===
There is also a vigorous tradition of singing excerpts of the Erotokritos to a specific set of tunes as a "song" genre in its own right (with or without instrumental accompaniment).The entire set of tunes will repeat as many times as required for the length of the excerpt that is being sung.

Sometimes, rhyming couplets are excerpted from the Erotokritos and sung as mantinadas.

The First Lines of the Erotokritos:

Του Κύκλου τα γυρίσματα, που ανεβοκατεβαίνουν,
και του Τροχού, που ώρες ψηλά κι ώρες στα βάθη πηαίνουν

Tou Kiklou ta girismata, pou anevokatevainoun,
kai tou Trochou, pou ores psila ki ores sta bathi piainoun

Of the great revolving cycle on which they travel,
and of the wheel, on which hours run high and low

=== Tabachaniotika ===
The "tabachaniotika" ([tabaxaˈɲotika]; sing.: tabachaniotiko – Greek: ταμπαχανιώτικο) songs are a Cretan urban musical repertory of instrumental and vocal music which belongs to a broader family of urban genres. Major features of the tabachaniotika songs are Dromoi (sing:in Greek dromos – δρόμος) (i.e., modes) and musical instruments such as the laouto and boulgarí (μπουλγκαρί, the Cretan orelse). Once again, the Cretan Mantinada often figures prominently in the words to such songs.

One explanation of the origin of the word tambahaniotika is that they come from the eponymous district area of Greek city of Patras Ταμπαχανιώτικα. Also, various conjectures are advanced to explain the meaning and origin of the term tabachaniotika. Kostas Papadakis believes that it comes from tabakaniotikes (ταμπακανιώτικες), which may mean places where hashish (Greek: ταμπάκο 'tobacco') was smoked while music was performed, as was the case with the tekédes (τεκέδες; pl. of tekés) of other major urban centres. This kind of genre was found in Crete and Smyrna and was played with lyra and laouto.

Unlike rebetiko, the tabachaniotika was not considered underground music and was only sung, not danced, according to Nikolaos Sarimanolis, the last living performer of this repertory in Chania. Only a few musicians played the tabachaniotika, the most famous being the boulgarí (a mandolin-like instrument) player Stelios Foustalieris (1911–1992) from Réthymnon. Foustalieris bought his first boulgarí in 1924. In 1979, he said that in Réthymnon, the boulgarí had been widespread during the 1920s. An early twentieth-century variation of rebetiko around the Lakkos brothel district in Irakleio is indicative of a "hybrid music scene associated with cross-cultural interaction between different social and ethnic groups and musical traditions."

Notwithstanding the dearth of performers, tabachaniotika songs were widespread and could also be performed at domestic gatherings. Notable artists of this genre who were originally refugees from Asia Minor include the bouzouki player Nikolaos "Nikolis" Sarimanolis (Νικολής Σαριμανώλης; born in Nea Ephesos in 1919) as a member of a folk-group founded by Kostas Papadakis in Chaniá in 1945, Antonis Katinaris (also based in Chaniá), and the Rethymnon-based Mihalis Arabatzoglou and Nikos Gialidis.

== History ==
=== Origins ===
Cretan music, like most of the traditional Greek music, began as product of ancient, Byzantine music, with western and eastern inspirations. The first recorded reference to lyra was in the 9th century by the Persian geographer Ibn Khurradadhbih (d. 911); in his lexicographical discussion of instruments, he cited the lyre (lūrā) as the typical instrument of the Byzantines along with the (organ). The lyra spread widely via the Byzantine trade routes that linked the three continents; in the 11th and 12th centuries European writers use the terms fiddle and lyra interchangeably when referring to bowed instruments. Descendants of the Byzantine lyra have continued to be played in post-Byzantine regions until the present day with few changes, for example the Calabrian Lira in Italy, the Cretan Lyra, the Gadulka in Bulgaria, and the Pontian lyra in Turkey.

Following the Fourth Crusade, the Venetians dominated the island and introduced later new instruments and styles of music. In particular the three-stringed lira da braccio was introduced. By the end of the 14th century, a poetic form called mantinada became popular, a rhyming couplet of fifteen syllables.

=== Post-Byzantine era ===
After the fall of Constantinople, many Byzantine and Venetian musicians took refuge on Crete and established schools of music. A French physician in 1547 (Pierre Belon) reported warrior-like dances on Crete, and an English traveler in 1599 reported the wild dances performed late at night.

The oldest transcription of folk songs in all of Greece can be traced to the 17th century, when songs in the rizitika type (see below) were mentioned by monks at Iviron and Xeropotamou Monasteries on Mount Athos.

The connection between music and religion continues in modern Crete; priests are said to be excellent folk singers, including the rizitiko singer Aggelos Psilakis. It was during this period, when the modern Cretan folk music was formed, that Francisco Leontaritis was active. The explicit musical connection between Cretan music and Byzantine chant was documented in the seminal study "La chanson grecque" by Swiss musicologist and archivist Samuel Baud-Bovy.

=== Twentieth-century consolidation ===
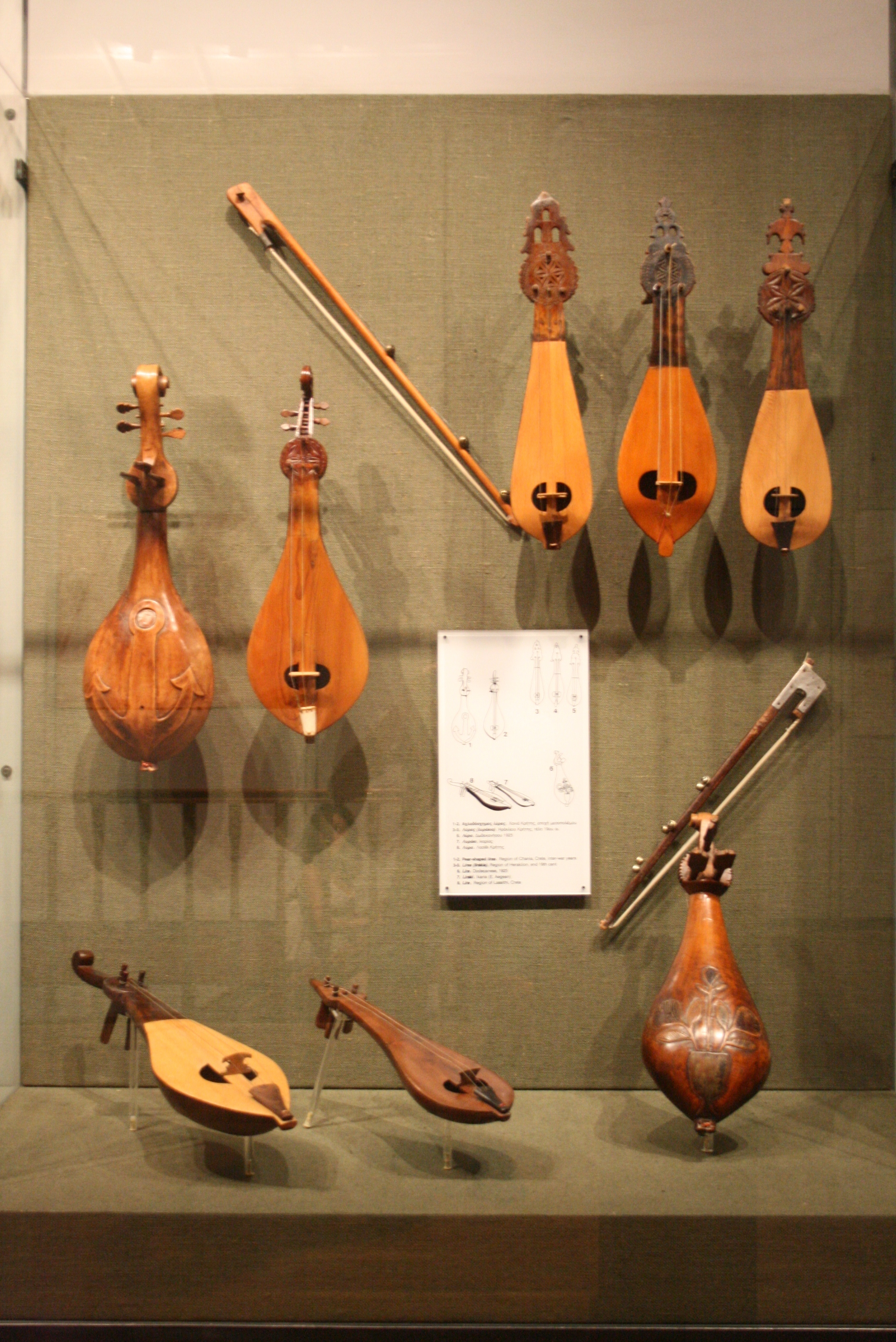
Cretan lyras

Cretan music underwent significant new developments in the twentieth-century, many related to professionalization, technology, and modernization, even as it remained closely interwoven with the fabric of many Cretans' everyday lives. Cretan music also continued to be widely performed by amateurs in everyday life as well.

==== Early masters (πρωτομάστορες) ====
The advent of recordings, the growing ease of travel between regions on the island, and the modernization of instruments such as the lyra all contributed to the construction of "Cretan music" as a single, island-wide Cretan, and thus somewhat less locally or regionally bound, tradition.

In the early 20th century, the violin was prominent in Cretan music in far Eastern and Western Crete. The modern form of the lyra appeared when a lyraki and violin were combined replacing the lyra drone strings with three strings in succession (d-a-e'). As a result, the range of the lyra was increased, and the lyra could start playing dances from the violin repertoire as well.

Common lyra

Lyraki

Cretan music was recorded as early as 1917, and has continued to be recorded extensively ever since.

Up until the Second World War, many early masters of the lyra, violin or laouto were recorded on 78, such as Antonogiorgakis, Harchalis, Kalogeridis, Kanteris, Karavitis, Lagoudakis (Lagos), Papadakis (Kareklas), Rodinos, Saridakis (Mavros). Many of these musicians and their recordings were largely forgotten in the wake of new waves of Cretan musicians and recordings artists after the Second World War, until their wider "rediscovery" upon the re-release of their music on compact discs and cassettes (and later online) starting in the late 1980s and early 1990s.

==== Mid-century ====
Certain widely recorded Cretan musicians, such as Kostas Mountakis and Thanasis Skordalos, further helped in the establishment and dissemination more widely across the island a shared repertory or canon of Cretan melodies.

As late as the 1960s, most Cretan traditional music was largely considered rural and still widely looked down upon in Cretan cities. Nikos Xylouris was among a new generation of musicians and recording artists whose work further helped to popularize Cretan music in the cities of Crete and beyond.

In the early 1960s, Greek composer Mikis Theodorakis based his theme music for the 1964 Cacoyannis film Zorba the Greek (itself based on the novel by Cretan author Nikos Kazantzakis) on Cretan syrta that had been recorded earlier by Giorgis Koutsourelis, such as on the hasapiko dance. The new dance was named "sirtaki" by choreographer Giorgos Provias. The film also shows clips of Cretan musicians performing Cretan music.

Greek composer Manos Hatzidakis also included a Cretan-syrtos-inspired opening song in his Kapetan Michales cycle (1966), written for theater and based on Cretan author Nikos Kazantzakis's Captain Michalis (frequently translated as Freedom and Death).

In 1968, German director Werner Herzog's short film Last Words includes extensive (uncredited) clips of Antonis Papadakis (Kareklas) and Lefteris Daskalakis performing Cretan music.

==== Late century ====
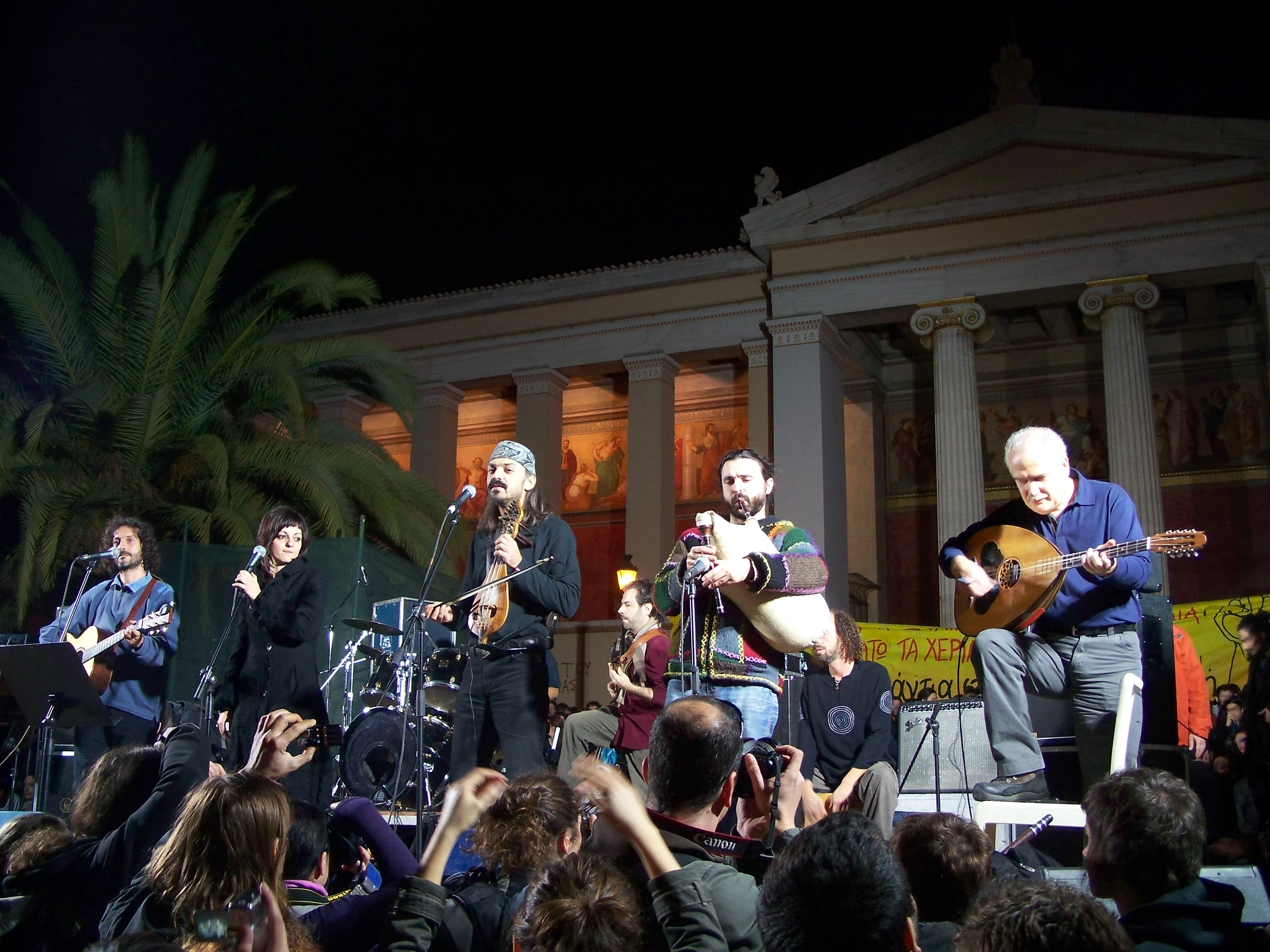
Chainides group

Cretan music continued to be performed and to develop professionally throughout the 1970s. The 1970s was also a period for several important documentaries about Cretan music, such as those for Greek public television hosted by Domna Samiou.

By the 1980s, some professional musicians were recording modern arrangements of Cretan music involving instruments such as the steel-string acoustic guitar, and more chordal accompaniments involving major, minor, and diminished harmonies.

By the 1990s, there were numerous local radio and television shows dedicated to Cretan music.

=== Influence and contemporary fusions ===
Some contemporary musicians in Crete, including Ross Daly, have experimented with new kinds of music that have been heavily influenced by Cretan traditional music.

Ethnomusicologist Kevin Dawe has noted that, "Recent fusions of Cretan/Greek, Turkish and various other oriental musics and musical instruments in both popular and traditional musics present a challenge to established notions of musical performance practice and musical identity."

== Dances ==
- Ntames
- Pentozali (siganos & grigoros)
- Pidikhtos (Anogeianos & Ethianos)
- Sousta (Rethemniotiki)
- Syrtos, like in the music of mainland Greece is a dance in 4/4 time. On Crete this dance is typically accompanied by an up tempo Cretan lyra melody
- Trizalis
- Angaliastos
- Maleviziotis

== Sociology ==
Numerous scholars have noted that modern Cretan music has been a predominantly male domain and, in particular, serves as a site for performing one's "manhood."

Several scholars have examined the history and politics surrounding the violin versus the lyra as the primary musical instrument identified with the island and employed in its music.

== Cretan musicians ==
Some of the earliest popular music stars from Crete were Andreas Rodinos, Yiannis Bernidakis, Stelios Koutsourelis, Stelios Foustalieris, Efstratios Kalogeridis, Kostas Papadakis, Michalis Kounelis, Kostas Mountakis, Leonidas Klados and Thanassis Skordalos. Later, in the 1960s, musicians like Nikos Xylouris (Psaronikos) and Yannis Markopoulos combined Cretan folk music with classical techniques. For the above choices, Nikos Xylouris received the negative criticism of conservative fans of the Cretan music but he remained popular, as did similarly styled performers like Charalambos Garganourakis and Vasilis Skoulas. Nowadays, prominent performers include Antonis Xylouris (Psarantonis), Giorgos Xylouris (Psarogiorgis), Ross Daly, Loudovikos ton Anogeion, Stelios Petrakis, Vasilis Stavrakakis, the group Chainides, Zacharias Spyridakis, Michalis Stavrakakis, Mitsos Stavrakakis, Michalis Kontaxakis, Dimitrios Vakakis, Giorgos Skordalos, Georgios Tsantakis, Michalis Tzouganakis, Elias Horeftakis, Giannis Haroulis, and Giorgis Pantermakis. And of course the legendary man with the double mustache, Nikolas Gonianakis. Nikos Stavrakakis

== See also ==
- Mantinada
- Music of Greece
- Cretan Greek
- Cretan Lyra
