= Mantinada =

Greek genre of folk song

Mantinada (Greek: μαντινάδα), plural mantinades (μαντινάδες) is the art of musical declamation (recitative) in form of a narrative or dialogue, sung in the rhythm of accompanying music. It is prominent in several parts of Greece, especially on the island of Crete where mantinades are performed in accompaniment of the Cretan lyra and Cretan laouto (a stringed instrument resembling lute). The word is derived from Venetian matinada, meaning "morning song".

They typically consist of Cretan rhyming couplets, often improvised during dance music. The rhymed Cretan poetry of the Renaissance, especially the verse epic Erotokritos, is reminiscent of the mantinada, and couplets from Erotokritos have been used as mantinades. Mantinades have either love or satire as their topics. They are invariably composed in dekapentasyllabos verse and are often antiphonal, i.e. a verse elicits a response and this leads to another response and so on.
