= Tsiattista =

Cypriot Poetic Form

Tsiattista (modern Greek: τσιαττιστά) is a form of Cypriot impromptu oral poetry. Using metered constraints, participants compose extemporaneous couplets against an opponent in the form of a friendly poetic duel. Tsiattista was added to the UNSECO list of Intangible Cultural Heritage in 2011.

== Structure ==
The poet-singers, known as tsiattistaes, follow a format of a two-verse rhyme with a total of 15 syllables. The most common metrical form is the iambic fifteen-syllable verse in a rhyming couplet, however sometimes eight-syllable, six-syllable or even nine-syllable verses are composed. It is often performed at festivals and weddings, sometimes with musical accompaniment with a violin and laouto. Tsiattista can involve switching between Greek and Turkish, demonstrating fast thinking within the very strict time constraints to be able to respond to their opponent. Tsiattistaes have traditionally been older men, although younger participants and women have begun to take part.
