= Yugoslav corn scandal =

Greek corruption scandal in the late 1980s

The Yugoslav corn scandal (Greek: σκάνδαλο του γιουγκοσλαβικού καλαμποκιού), also known as Greek maize, was a political corruption scandal in Greece between 1986 and 1990. A total of 20,000 tons of corn were imported from Yugoslavia in 1986 and falsely labeled as Greek through forged documents. The corn was then exported to other European Economic Community (EEC) countries, allowing the fraudulent claim of $1.5 million in EEC subsidies intended for domestic Greek corn. The state-owned company International Trade Company (ITCO), a government-controlled entity responsible for managing agricultural trade, played a key role in facilitating the fraudulent shipments.

After the EEC initiated an investigation, Greek government officials were involved in efforts to cover up the scheme. In 1989, Greece was fined over $3.8 million by the European Court of Justice. The affair attracted attention in the press and also fueled broader political controversies surrounding the PASOK government. Investigations by the Greek Parliament followed, leading to a trial in Greece in 1990, where six individuals, including a deputy minister, were convicted for their involvement. The case later gained a legal precedent in EEC law by reinforcing the principle that member states must impose sanctions that are effective, proportionate, and dissuasive to protect the interests of EEC.

== Crime and cover-up ==
On 8 May 1986, a ship called Alfonsina (Greek: Αλφονσίνα) reached the port of Thessaloniki carrying 9,000 tons of corn from Koper, Yugoslavia. However, the documentation stated that the corn cargo originated in Kavala. The company responsible was International Trade Company (ITCO), a state company founded under the PASOK-led government for price control purposes. Its president was Soulis Apostolopoulos. The corn was sold initially to Granomar (a company located in Switzerland) and then to Genk, a Belgian company. There were the following benefits from this scheme: the Greek state would avoid paying compensatory (import) levies to the EEC, the state would get the benefit of elevated corn prices at $245 a ton instead of $101 a ton for Yugoslav corn, and, by reporting artificially inflated agricultural productivity, the state would gain access to additional EEC subsidies.

News of the corn sale and, allegedly, complaints reached the EEC in Brussels within days. Subsequently, on 17 August 1986, a European committee arrived in Greece to investigate the state's documentation regarding the transactions. Greek officials, under Deputy Minister of Finance Nikos Athanasopoulos, assured the committee that the corn was of Greek origin and forged documents to cover it up. Athanasopoulos also tried to delay and confuse the inspectors. At some point, Athanasopoulos complained to Emile Mennens, a Belgian member of the investigation committee: "When we Greeks were building Parthenons, you barbarians were eating acorns."

== European trial ==
In November 1986, the European Commission pressured the Greek government to provide an explanation for the scandal. However, their request was publicly denied by the Minister of Foreign Affairs, Karolos Papoulias. In 1987, the European Commission imposed a fine on Greece of $2.5 million for the illegal transaction. The European Commission brought the case before the European Court of Justice, marking the first recorded instance of the 12-nation European Community being defrauded by a member state. The scandal placed the Greek diplomats and bankers in a difficult position within the European Community, since the culprit was the Greek government rather than an individual. The Greek government refused to participate in the trial proceedings. European investigations found at least two fraudulent corn shipments; the second shipment was 11,000 tons of corn arriving by train to Thessaloniki and loaded onto a cargo ship to be sold in Belgium as Greek corn. On 21 September 1989, the trial concluded without the participation of the Greek government, which was fined $3.8 million, a figure that included the initial fine, the expenses of the court, and interest.

== June elections and Greek trial ==
PASOK lost in the June 1989 elections due in part to the Koskotas scandal, which implicated PASOK members, and the over 200 scandals reported over the course of PASOK administrations from 1981 to 1989. The conservative New Democracy and the united leftist parties under Synaspismos, despite being on opposite ideological sides and having fought against each other in the Greek Civil War (1946–1949), formed a coalition government committed to cleansing the state ("Catharsis") of corruption scandals associated with members of PASOK.

Only days after the formation of the coalition government, the Hellenic Parliament commenced proceedings to lift the parliamentary immunity of Athanasopoulos. A 12-member committee began an investigation of the alleged fraudulent activity surrounding the import and subsequent export sale of Yugoslav corn. Witnesses who worked at the ports through which the corn shipment passed testified that Athanasopoulos gave instructions to not report the corn. On 23 August 1989, Athanasopoulos confessed during the proceedings but argued that the decision to cover up the scheme was taken after discussions with his colleagues (without naming them) on the grounds of "national duty and obligation". Specifically, he argued, "responsible ministers had decided to cover up the scandal in the country's interests [...] Otherwise, it would have been disclosed that a state-controlled company was violating Community regulations, which would have been damaging to the country's prestige in the E.C. [European Community]". Akis Tsochatzopoulos, a PASOK deputy, argued that the scandal was due to tense competition between multinational corporations. In January 1990, Athanasopoulos and the company's president, who owned the corn cargo, were remanded in custody.

The Greek courts indicted Athanasopoulos for exporting Yugoslav corn as Greek, so that ITCO, the state-controlled export company, could pocket $1.5 million in European Common Market subsidies. The specific charges were instigation in issuing false certificates, forgery and complicity in forgery. The trial was conducted by a 12-member special court chaired by the president of the Supreme Court of Greece. In addition to the "national interests" argument, Athanasopoulos' defense rested on the assertion that the statute of limitations had expired as well as claims of procedural irregularities. Thirteen former ministers were witnesses for the defense, and they all used the "national interest" argument. Historian Richard Clogg described Athanasopoulos' defense as an effort to portray the defrauding of the EEC as a patriotic duty. However, the court unanimously rejected Athanasopoulos' defense arguments. On 11 August 1990, Athanasopoulos was found guilty and sentenced to three and a half years in prison. The president of the company was sentenced to three years and eight months in prison. Four officials tried with him also received prison sentences ranging from 10 to 18 months.

The trial was broadcast live with state and private television channels focusing on different aspects of the developments inside and outside the courtroom depending on their political affiliation. The pro-PASOK press and radio strongly criticized witnesses for the prosecution as traitors to the nation. During the trial, PASOK supporters gathered outside the court and disapproved of the court's decision by shouting "Shame" (Greek: Αίσχος) and chanting the Cretan song Pote Tha Kanei Xasteria.

== Aftermath ==
The decision on Athanasopoulos, according to judicial sources, gave "the green light" to initiate trials against other former PASOK government members, including Prime Minister Andreas Papandreou, for their involvement in the Koskotas scandal and widespread surveillance of political opponents. Athanasopoulos served nine months in the Korydallos Prison. He was the only politician imprisoned for PASOK's scandals of the late 1980s. A few months later, Menios Koutsogiorgas spent three months in jail pending the Koskotas trial but died on the witness stand, and all prison verdicts were redeemable through monetary compensation. Athanasopoulos was re-elected to Parliament following his release, representing Athens B constituency in the 1993 Greek parliamentary election. On 17 January 1994, the newly installed PASOK government granted a pardon to Athanasopoulos.

According to a 2003 study, levels of corruption in Greek politics remained consistently high under administrations in the 1986-1997 period, regardless of their political orientation. The study argues that this was symptomatic of the institutionalization of corruption in the country and leading to widespread distrust of political parties and the political class in general. Press stories relating to corruption reached a peak under the conservative New Democracy government that followed PASOK in 1990–1993. Notable scandals included its own scandal, involving the AGET Heracles cement company, but also scandals from PASOK era were uncovered in early 1990s.

The legal case in the European Court of Justice regarding the scandal became a reference point concerning how the member states settle violations of European law. The court held that sanctions must be "effective, proportionate, and dissuasive". While the European Community establishes the minimum and maximum penalty framework for criminal offenses, each member state is responsible for transposing the directive and determining the specific maximum penalty applicable within its own jurisdiction.
