= Mother (Xylouris White album) =

Studio album by Xylouris White
- Released: 19 January 2018
- Genre: Indie folk
- Length: 36:08
- Label: Bella Union/Universal
- Producer: Guy Picciotto

Xylouris White chronology
Black Peak (2016)	Mother (2018)	The Sisypheans (2019)

Mother is the third studio album by Australian duo Xylouris White. It was released on 19 January 2018, through Bella Union. At the ARIA Music Awards of 2018 it was nominated for Best World Music Album.

== Critical reception ==
Professional ratings
Aggregate scores
Source	Rating
AnyDecentMusic?	7.3/10
Metacritic	78/100
Review scores
Source	Rating
AllMusic	4/5 stars
Drowned in Sound	7/10
Exclaim!	9/10
The Guardian	4/5 stars
Loud and Quiet	6/10
Sputnikmusic	3.8/5

Mother was met with "generally favorable" reviews from critics. At Metacritic, which assigns a weighted average rating out of 100 to reviews from mainstream publications, this release received an average score of 78, based on 11 reviews. Aggregator Album of the Year gave the release a 75 out of 100 based on a critical consensus of 10 reviews.

Thom Jurek from AllMusic said the album is "more spacious album than either of its predecessors. Each tune births further exploration as each statement is a (sometimes slightly) varied response but more often a question. While the album is integral to its predecessors as part of a loosely conceived and articulated musical trilogy, it stands on its own as an exercise in close listening, careful communication, and quiet revelation." Vish Khanna from Exclaim! said: "Mother finds Xylouris White quietly questioning musical structure and expectations. They remain trailblazing outliers with a supernatural power to express themselves as one and, with a warmth and welcoming generosity of spirit, invite listeners to step up and out of their comfort zones." Robin Denselow from The Guardian wrote: "Their two earlier albums were remarkable for their blend of improvisation and energy, and the new set proves they are capable of treating elegant, thoughtful songs with an equal spirit of adventure. The quieter songs bring further displays of the empathy between them, with the thoughtful Lullaby providing a delicate ending to an exhilarating set."

== Track listing ==
Mother track listing
No.	Title	Writer(s)	Length
1.	"In Medias Res"	Jim White; George Xylouris	3:26
2.	"Only Love"	White; Xylouris; Giorgis Stavrakakis	3:29
3.	"Motorcycle Kondolies"	White; Xylouris	7:15
4.	"Spud's Garden"	White; Xylouris; Aristeidis Chairetis	3:53
5.	"Daphne"	White; Xylouris; Mitsos Stavrakakis	5:07
6.	"Achilles Heel"	White; Xylouris; Chairetis	3:06
7.	"Woman From Anogeia"		2:17
8.	"Call and Response"	White; Xylouris	3:23
10.	"Lullaby"		4:12

== Personnel ==
Musicians

- George Xylouris – vocals, Cretan laouto, cello
- Jim White – drums
- Aristeidis Chairetis – backing vocals
- Anna Roberts-Gevalt – violin
- Giorgis Stavrakakis – backing vocals
- Mitsos Stavrakakis – backing vocals

Production

- Eli Crews – mixing
- Bryce Goggin – engineer, mixing
- Harris Newman – mastering
- Guy Picciotto – mixing, producer
- Yosimar Gomez – engineer
- Nikos Kefalogiannis – engineer, mixing
