= Labropoulos =

Labropoulos (Greek: Λαμπρόπουλος) or Lambropoulos or Lampropoulos is a Greek surname (female version Labropoulou (Greek: Λαμπροπούλου)) and may refer to the following notable people:

- Andreas Labropoulos (born 1988), Greek footballer
- Emmanuella Lambropoulos (born 1990), Canadian politician
- Fotios Lampropoulos (born 1983), Greek basketball player
- Giorgos Labropoulos (born 1984), Greek footballer
- Konstantinos Lambropoulos (born 1990), Greek footballer
- Marilita Lambropoulou (born 1974), Greek actress
