= Giannis Haroulis =

Greek singer, songwriter and lute player (born 1981)

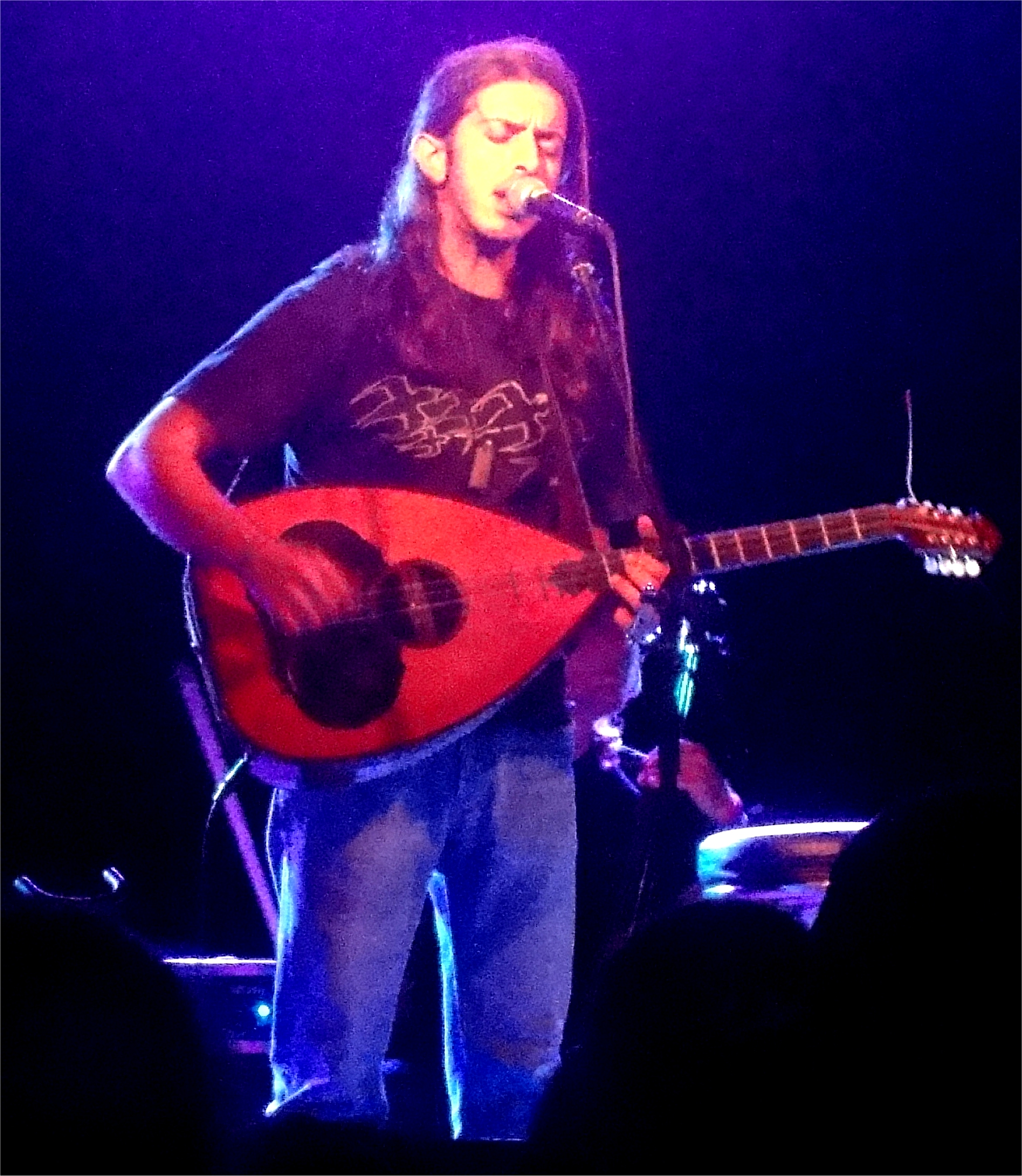
- Giannis Haroulis live in 2011

Background information
- Born: January 13, 1981 (age 45); Crete, Greece
- Genres: Greek folk, Cretan, rock, ethnic
- Occupations: Musician, songwriter
- Instruments: Vocals, lute, mandolin
- Years active: 2002–present
- Website: giannisharoulis.gr

Giannis Haroulis (Greek: Γιάννης Χαρούλης; born January 13, 1981) is a Greek singer, songwriter and lute player. He plays a mixture of Greek folk and traditional Cretan music infused with rock elements and modern sounds.

He was born and raised in Crete, where he learned to play the lute and gave his first live performances at local festivals. In 2002, he traveled to Athens to take part in a concert, dedicated to Nikos Xilouris, which was recorded and released as an album entitled When My Friends Come, Mother in 2003.

He has unveiled several solo albums, including "Around Me and Within" in 2003, "Winter Flower" in 2006, "Witchcrafts" in 2012, and "Twelve Lays of the Gypsy" in 2016. Witchcrafts received the Golden Album award, while his 2015 live album A Thousand Times Welcome – Live entered the Greek music charts at the number one slot.

Giannis Haroulis has sung as a special guest on many albums of other artists and has collaborated with some of the most famous Greek musicians, such as Mikis Theodorakis, Stavros Xarchakos, Thanasis Papakonstantinou, Dionysis Savvopoulos, Alkistis Protopsalti, Sokratis Malamas, Chainides, Loukas Thanoy, Christos Tsiamoulis, Manos Eleutheriou, Christos Thiveos, Miltos Pashalidis, Nikos Portokaloglou, Manos Xydous, Minos Matsas, Natassa Bofiliou and many others. He has toured Greece extensively throughout the years and in March 2015 he embarked on his first European tour performing in Belgium, Germany, Switzerland and the Netherlands.

== Discography ==
=== Solo albums ===
- 2003: Around Me and Within (Γύρω μου και εντός)
- 2006: Winter Flower (Χειμωνανθός)
- 2012: Witchcrafts (Μαγγανείες)
- 2015: A Thousand Times Welcome – Live (Χίλια καλώς εσμίξαμε – Live)
- 2016: Twelve Lays of the Gypsy (Ο Δωδεκάλογος του γύφτου)

=== Collaborations ===
- 2003: When My Friends Come, Mother (Σαν έρθουν μάνα οι φίλοι μου) – Various
- 2005: It’s Been Ten Years… (Έχουν περάσει χρόνοι δέκα..) – Miltos Pashalidis
- 2005: Twelve and One Stares at the Dodecanese (Δώδεκα και μία ματιές στα Δωδεκάνησα) – Various
- 2005: The Charmer and the Dragontooth (Ο γητευτής και το δρακοδόντι ) – Chainides
- 2005: The Tickler (Ο Γαργαλιστής) – Dimitris Baslam
- 2005: Cretan Precious (Της Κρήτης τα πολύτιμα) – Various
- 2006: Cretan Precious II (Της Κρήτης τα πολύτιμα ΙΙ) – Various
- 2006: Teardrop On Glass (Δάκρυ στο γυαλί) – Estudiantina
- 2007: Twelve Fests (Δωδεκάορτο) – Christos Tsiamoulis
- 2007: House of Endurance (Οίκος αντοχής) – Danae Panagiotopoulou
- 2007: Agisilagos (Ο Αγησίλαγος) – Dimitris Baslam
- 2007: The Generation of 2010 (Η γενιά του 2010) – Difono, 141
- 2008: The Shaman (Ο Σαμάνος) – Thanasis Papakonstantinou, Dionysis Savvopoulos
- 2008: Stars Will Always Be Far Away (Τ’ αστέρια θα ‘ναι πάντα μακριά) – Μanos Xydous
- 2008: Young Songs (Τραγουδάκια γάλακτος) – Μ. Halkousaki & Α. Halikia
- 2008: Cretan Precious III (Της Κρήτης τα πολύτιμα IΙΙ) – Various
- 2010: The Island (Το νησί) – Minos Matsas
- 2010: Small Hopes (Μικρές ελπίδες) – Paulos Sinodinos
- 2011: In The Hatches Of Time (Στου χρόνου τις καταπακτές) – Notis Mauroudis
- 2011: I Have A Plan (Έχω ένα σχέδιο) – Themis Karamouratidis
- 2012: Maybe (Ίσως) – Nikos Portokaloglou
- 2014: View Of Paradise (Θέα παραδείσου) – Alkistis Protopsalti
- 2014: Beyond Formalism (Έξω απ' τα μέτρα) – Vangelis Kazantzis
- 2016: I Stored The Dream (Φύλαξα τ’ όνειρο) - Mikis Theodorakis
