= Thanasis Papakonstantinou =

Greek singer-songwriter (born 1959)

Thanasis Papakonstantinou Θανάσης Παπακωνσταντίνου
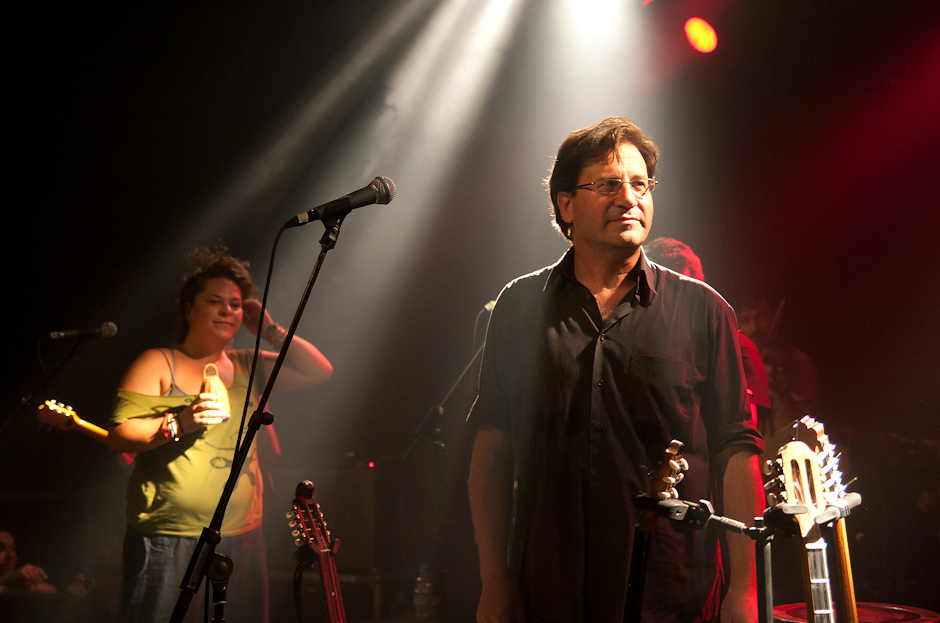
- Thanasis Papakonstantinou, performing live in Berlin, 12 February 2012

Background information
- Born: Athanasios Papakonstantinou; 26 April 1959 (age 67); Elassona, Greece
- Genres: Experimental, folk, rembetiko
- Occupation: Singer-songwriter
- Instruments: Vocals, bouzoukomana, tzouras, bouzouki, laouto
- Years active: 1982–present

Athanasios "Thanasis" Papakonstantinou (Greek: Αθανάσιος (Θανάσης) Παπακωνσταντίνου; born 26 April 1959) is a Greek singer-songwriter.

== Biography ==
Papakonstantinou studied mechanical engineering in Thessaloniki, which he practices as well as being a musician. After his military service, he started handcrafting traditional Greek musical instruments.

Now a Larissa resident, Papakonstantinou has established himself as one of the most original and prolific people in the Greek music scene. He writes music in the Greek folk idiom, stemming from his own recollections of traditional songs his parents sang while working in the field. He usually writes his own lyrics or uses poems. He has collaborated with numerous notable artists from the Greek music scene, such as Giannis Aggelakas, Melina Kana, Sokratis Malamas, Lizeta Kalimeri, Nikos Papazoglou.

In 2002, his song Nanourisma was featured in the film by Nikos Grammatikos O Vasilias (The King). The 2007 documentary The Horns of the Bull is dedicated to Papakonstantinou's work.

== Discography ==
- Αγία Νοσταλγία (Holy Nostalgia, Agia Nostalgia) (1993)
- Στην Ανδρομέδα και στη Γη (In Andromeda and on Earth, Stin Andromeda kai sti Gi) (1995)
- Της Αγάπης Γερακάρης (Falconer of Love, Tis Agapis Gerakaris) (1996)
- Λάφυρα (Loot, Lafyra) (1998)
- Βραχνός Προφήτης (Hoarse Prophet, Vrachnos Profitis) (2000)
- Αγρύπνια (Vigil, Agrypnia) (2002)
- Τα ζωντανά (The Live Ones, Ta Zontana) (2004)
- Οι πρώτες ηχογραφήσεις (The First Recordings, Oi protes ichografiseis) (2005)
- Η βροχή από κάτω (The Rain from Below, I vrochi apo kato) (2006)
- Διάφανος (Diaphanous, Diaphanos) (2006)
- Ο Σαμάνος (The Shaman, O Samanos) (2008)
- Ο ελάχιστος εαυτός (The Minimal Self, O elachistos eaftos) (2011)
- Πρόσκληση σε δείπνο κυανίου (Invitation to Cyanide Dinner, Prosklisi se Deipno Kianiou) (2014)
- Με στόμα που γελά (A Mouth with a Smile, Me stoma pou gela) (2018)
- Απροστάτευτος (Unprotected, Aprostateftos) (2021)
- Urbanum (Urbanum) (2023)

== Band members ==
- Babis Papadopoulos
- George Bandoek Apostolakis
- Alex Apostolakis
- Andreas Polyzogopoulos
- Costas Pantelis
- Florian Mikuta
- Tasos Misyrlis
- Makis Boukalis
- Sotiris Douvas
- Dimitris Mystakidis
- Dimitris Baslam
- Fotis Siotas
- Pantelis Stoikos
- Giannis Ioannidis
- Antonis Maratos
- Costis Zouliatis
- Costis Christodoulou
- Alexandros Ktistakis
- Martha Frintzila
- Matoula Zamani
