= Chainides =

Cretan folk music group

Hainides
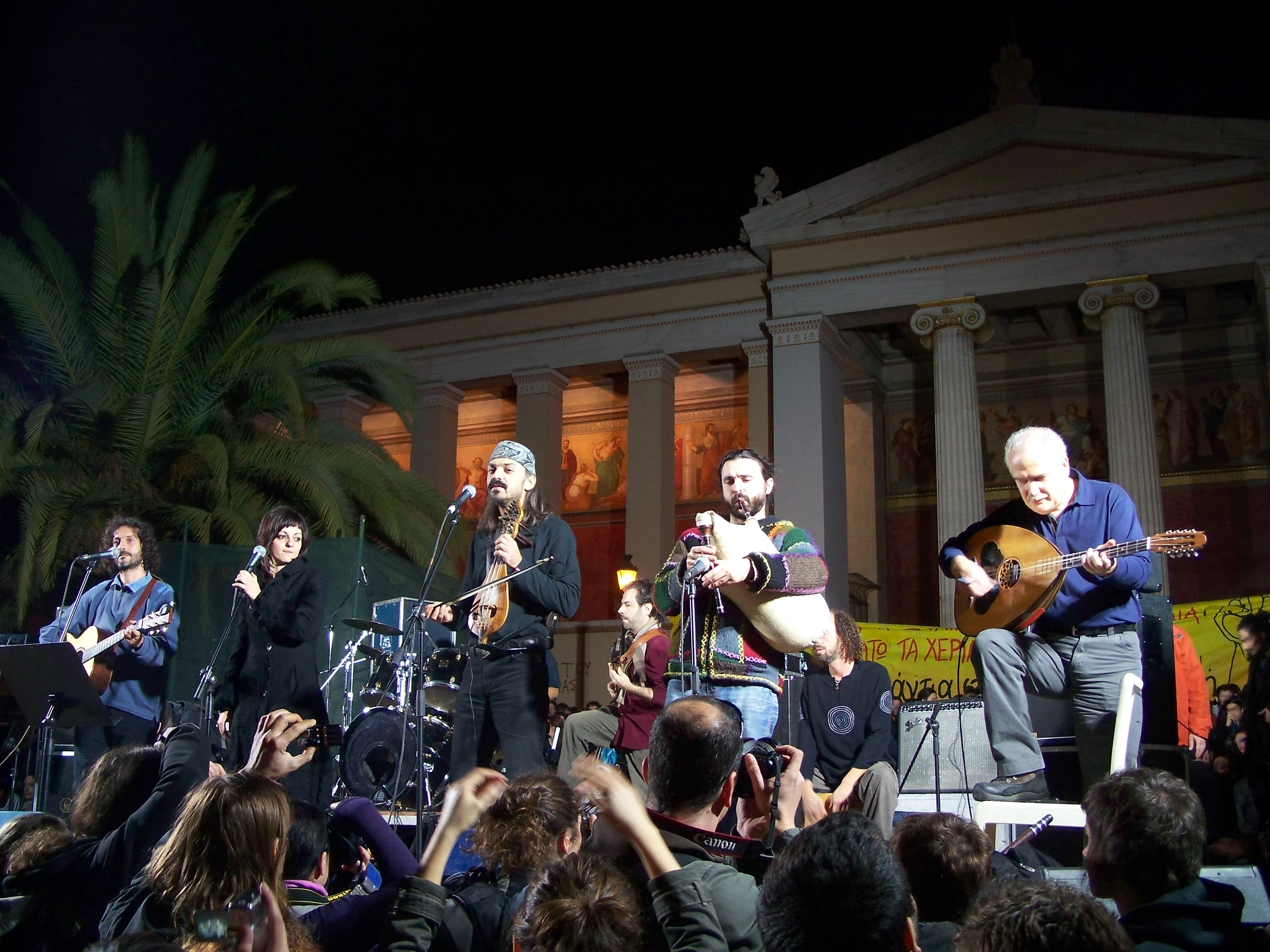
- Hainides, 2008

Background information
- Origin: Crete
- Genres: Folk
- Years active: 1990 – present
- Members: D. Apostolakis, D. Zaharioudakis, M. Koti, A. Nonis, D. Brentas, M. Nikopoulos, A. Skamnakis
- Past members: G. Laodikis, M. Pashalidis, K. Spyridaki, M. Stavrakakis, P. Tsoukalas
- Website: http://www.hainides.gr/

Hainides (Greek: Χαΐνηδες) is a Cretan folk music group who are inspired by the vast legacy of traditional Cretan music and whose lyrics borrow words from the Cretan Greek dialect. The group's name is the plural of the word haínis (Greek: χαΐνης), meaning a fugitive rebel.

== History ==
The group was formed in March 1990 by a group of friends, namely Dimitris Apostolakis, Dimitris Zaharioudakis, Giorgos Laodikis, Miltos Pashalidis and Kallia Spyridaki. Most of them were then students at the University of Crete. Their discographical debut was in 1991 with the album Hainides that was warmly received by the public. Hainides rapidly grew to seven members and released three more albums before being temporarily dissolved in 1997. One year later, Dimitris Apostolakis and Dimitris Zaharioudakis reinstated the group that was joined by the new members Maria Koti, Alexis Nonis, Periklis Tsoukalas and Antonis Skamnakis.

Over the years, Hainides have collaborated with several well-known musicians and singers. They have performed in several locations both in Greece and abroad and have recorded seven studio albums.

== Group Members ==
Dimitris Apostolakis - Cretan lyra, vocals
Dimitris Zaharioudakis - acoustic guitar, vocals
Angeliki Syrkou - vocals
Mihalis Nikopoulos - mandolin, bouzouki, laouto
Peter Jaques - trumpet, clarinet, ney
Mihalis Galanis - drums
Giorgos Konstantinou - bass

== Discography ==
- 1991 - Χαΐνηδες (Chainides)
- 1993 - Κόσμος κι όνειρο είναι ένα (Kosmos ki oniro ine ena)
- 1994 - Με κόντρα τον καιρό (Me kontra ton kero)
- 1997 - Το μεγάλο ταξίδι (To megalo taxidi)
- 2000 - Ο ξυπόλητος πρίγκηπας (O xipolitos prigipas), double album
- 2002 - Δελτίο ειδήσεων (Deltio idiseon), 3 songs
- 2005 - Ο γητευτής και το δρακοδόντι (O giteftis kai to drakodonti), double album
- 2007 - Ο Καραγκιόζης στη Γιουροβίζιον (O Karagiozis stin Eurovision)
- 2008 - Η κάθοδος των Σαλτιμπάγκων (I kathodos ton Saltimpagon)
- 2011 - Αγροκτηνοτροφικά και Μητροπολιτικά (Agroktinotrofika & Mitropolitika), double album

== Impact ==
Hainides have treated the Cretan music tradition with love and respect, considering it as something very much alive rather than a thing of a gone past. The group's success is considered to have paved the road for other young artists to embrace the Cretan music tradition and attempt to enrich it with new elements.

== See also ==
- Greek folk music
- Cretan music
