= Kostas Papadakis (violinist) =

Greek musician (1920–2003)

Kostas Papadakis (Kissamos, 1920 – May 2003) was a popular Cretan violinist, famous for playing Cretan folk music. He was known by the nickname "Naftis" (Ναύτης) which, in Greek, means sailor. He began playing the violin at age seven. Papadakis played an Italian Guarnerius violin dated back to 1710, when Crete was under Venetian occupation. His first public performance took place at a wedding reception when he was ten. From 1959 till 1976 he lived in the United States and, in 1981, he moved to Australia where he stayed for five years. He performed live in numerous musical events and festivals in different countries.

Kostas Papadakis first recorded an album in 1938. Throughout his career, he participated in several recordings that included his own compositions. He also published a book in 1989 entitled "Cretan" Lyra, a Myth which supported the idea that the pear-shaped bowed string instrument called "lyra" in Crete was not invented in Crete (as some people believed in the 20th century) but was imported in Crete from Ottoman Muslims who occupied the island after the Venetians left, in the 17th century. He also asserted that the violin is the primary soloist Cretan instrument and not the lyra - the violin and its predecessors being imported in Crete by the Venetians, with the earliest traditionally known Cretan violinist being Stefanos Triantafillakis (1715-1800) who in the Cretan tradition is credited with the composition of the famous Cretan dance Pentozali.

Papadakis is credited with preserving the original composition of the Pentozali (12 parts) and the original melody of the famous Cretan song Erotokritos which he originally heard on the mandolin.
