= The Sisypheans =

Studio album by Xylouris White
- Released: 8 November 2019
- Length: 39:50
- Label: Drag City

Xylouris White chronology
Mother (2018)	The Sisypheans (2019)

Singles from The Sisypheans
- 1. "Tree Song" Released: 28 August 2019; 2. "Black Sea" Released: 25 September 2019

Professional ratings
Aggregate scores
Source	Rating
Metacritic	77/100
Review scores
Source	Rating
AllMusic	4/5 stars
The Guardian	4/5 stars
Loud and Quiet	7/10
MusicOMH	3/5 stars

The Sisypheans is the fourth studio album by Australian band Xylouris White. It was released on 8 November 2019 under Drag City.

The album is named after the Ancient Greek king Sisyphus.

== Critical reception ==
The Sisypheans was met with generally favourable reviews from critics. At Metacritic, which assigns a weighted average rating out of 100 to reviews from mainstream publications, this release received an average score of 77, based on 5 reviews.

== Track listing ==
The Sisypheans track listing
No.	Title	Length
1.	"Tree Song"	7:24
2.	"Goat Hair Bow"	3:28
3.	"Heart's Eyes"	6:38
4.	"Telephone Song"	3:12
5.	"Black Sea"	4:19
6.	"Inland"	4:59
7.	"Wedding Song"	5:22
8.	"Ascension"	4:28
