= Psarantonis =

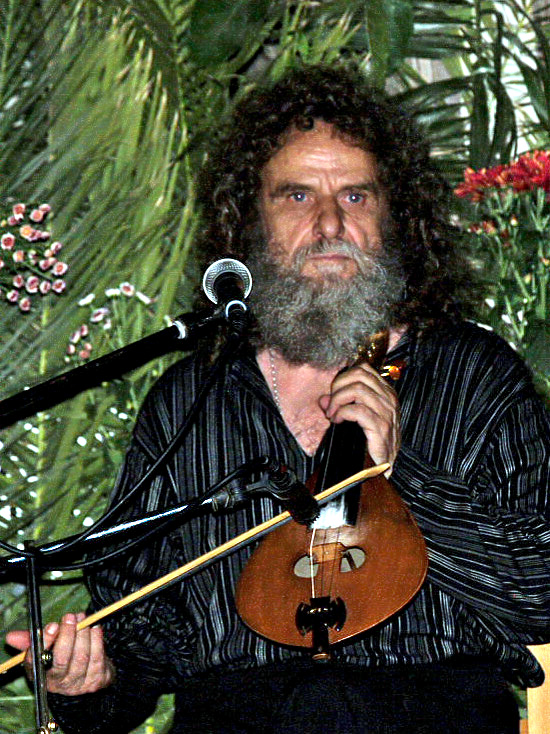
- Psarantonis in 2006

Background information
- Born: Antonios Xylouris Αντώνιος Ξυλούρης; September 6, 1937 (age 88); Anogeia, Crete, Greece
- Genres: Greek folk
- Occupations: Composer, singer
- Instruments: Cretan lyra, mandolin, mandola
- Years active: 1961–present

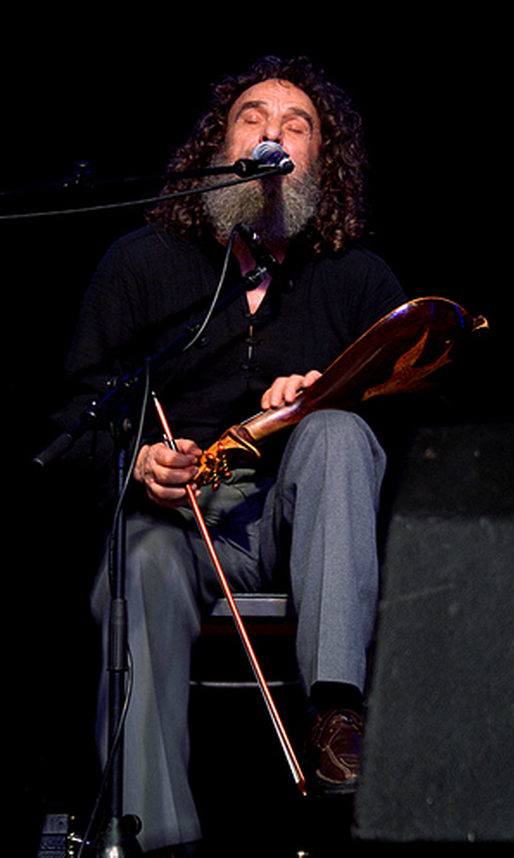
Psarantonis at the "All Tomorrow's Parties festival", curated by Dirty Three (Butlins, Minehead, UK, 27-April-2007)

Antonios "Antonis" Xylouris (Greek: Αντώνιος "Αντώνης" Ξυλούρης; born September 6, 1937), nicknamed Psarantonis (Greek: Ψαραντώνης), is a Greek composer, singer and performer of lyra, the bowed string instrument of Crete and most popular surviving form of the medieval Byzantine lyra.

== Biography ==
Psarantonis comes from the mountainous village of Anogeia in Crete which during World War II was destroyed by the German occupying forces, when he was just two years old. Psarantonis is the younger brother of the late Nikos Xylouris, a notable Cretan singer/musician as well as the older brother of Yiannis Xylouris, an equally notable Cretan musician. Psarantonis is also the father of Cretan musician George Xylouris and the Greek singer Niki Xylouris.

Psarantonis is known for the special timbre of his voice and his lyra playing style. Apart from the lyra Psarantonis plays various traditional instruments. He first played the lyre at the age of 13 and recorded his first single in 1964, titled "I Thought of Denying You" (Greek: Εσκέφτηκα να σ' αρνηθώ). He has released many recordings since then and has represented Greece many times in festivals abroad.

In May 2005, Psarantonis performed at the World Music Institute's 20th anniversary benefit concert at Town Hall, New York. In 2007 at the festival Rock "All tomorrow's Parties" in Minehead, UK. In January 2009, he gave memorable performances in the rock music festival All Tomorrow's Parties hosted in Brisbane, Sydney and Mount Buller (in Victoria) and curated by Nick Cave & The Bad Seeds. In 2007 he worked with Daemonia Nymphe on their album Krataia Asterope doing the vocals and playing the lyra in the track Dios Astrapaiou

He has also worked with Italian singer and songwriter Vinicio Capossela, similarly to his son Labis.

== Discography ==
- 1973: Κρητική Ξαστερία
- 1976: Η Μάχη της Κρήτης
- 1976: Πηγές
- 1978: Σαϊτέματα
- 1982: Αναστορήματα
- 1983: Οι ρίζες μου
- 1985: Εκτός Εαυτού
- 1986: Να κάμω θέλω ταραχή
- 1989: Τα μεράκια του Ψαραντώνη
- 1990: Από φλόγες η Κρήτη ζωσμένη
- 1991: 30 Χρόνια Ψαραντώνης
- 1991: Μαθήματα Πατριδογνωσίας
- 1991: Ο γιος του Ψηλορείτη – Son of Psiloritis
- 1994: Παλιό κρασί 'ναι η σκέψη μου – My thoughts are like old wine
- 1995: Μουσική Ανοιξη
- 1996: Από Καρδιάς – De Profundis
- 1997: Cretan Music – The way of Psarantonis
- 1998: Νογώ – I reckon reflexions
- 1999: Ιδαίον Άνδρον -Idaion Antron
- 2000: Τέσσερις Δρόμοι για τον Ερωτόκριτο
- 2000: Λεόντιος Μαχαιράς – Χρονικό της Κύπρου (Μουσική Ψαραντώνης)
- 2000: Χαϊνιδες – Ο Ξυπόλυτος Πρίγκιπας
- 2001: Νίκος Κυπουργος -Τα Μυστικά του Κήπου
- 2002: Ριζίτικα – Rizitika
- 2002: Παπά-Στεφανής ο Νίκας-Αγρίμι και Κοράσο
- 2007: Ψαραντωνης & Βασίλης Σκουλάς – Άνθη του Χρόνου
- 2007: Να 'χεν η Θάλασσα βουνά – Had the Sea mountains
- 2008 :Σαν Πυροβατης
- 2008: Αντάρτες των βουνών – Mountain rebels
- 2009: Εκειά που θέλω

== See also ==
- Byzantine Lyra
- Cretan Lyra
- Music of Crete
