= Marilita Lambropoulou =

Greek actress (born 1974)

Marilita Lambropoulou (Greek: Μαριλίτα Λαμπροπούλου, Marilíta Lampropoúlou; born July 15, 1974, in Athens, Greece) is a Greek actress. She is very popular with home audiences for her work in films like Athens Blues (Μια Μέρα τη Νύχτα, Mia Mera ti Nychta), directed by Giorgos Panousopoulos (2002) and The King (Ο Βασιλιάς, O Vasilias), directed by Nikos Grammatikos (2002), for which she won the "Quality Award".

Marilita trained at the Theatre Studies Department of the University of Patras, as well as at a series of seminars organised by the National Theatre. Her stage work includes roles in both classical and contemporary theatre, most recently in Bat's The House of the Sleeping Girls at the Amore Theater. Marilita has also directed theatre, including The Caretaker by Harold Pinter and Psychology of the Syrian Husband by Emmanuil Roidis. She has acted in television in such leads roles as Maria in the television film, Three Wishes (Tρεις Eυχές, Treis Evches). For the last 5 years she has been acting in leading roles in both comedy and drama series for TV. In 2003, she represented Greece in Berlin and was voted as one of Europe's film Shooting Stars by the European Film Promotion.

== Filmography ==
=== Television ===
Year	Title	Role	Notes	Reference
2002	Three Wishes	Maria	Television movie	
2002–2003	About winds and waters	Anna	22 episodes	
2003–2004	Love like Desert	Leda Espieroglou	Lead role, 24 episodes	
2004–2005	Western Suburbs' Lover	Liza Orphanou	Lead role, 33 episodes	
2005	Seven Deadly Mothers-in-law	Irina	Episode: "The Amazed Mother-in-law"	
2005–2006	The Last Lord of the Balkans	Pembe	Lead role, 11 episodes	
2005–2007	Love by subsidy OGA	Alice	Lead role, 53 episodes	
2007–2008	The Lighthouse	Lina	Lead role, 17 episodes (13 unaired)	
2007–2008	Traces	Daphne Digeni	Lead role, 12 episodes	
2008–2009	There are men and men	Rena Pierri	Lead role, 7 episodes	
2011–2012	There are moments	Leda Krondira	Main role, 91 episodes	
2014–2015	The Oath of Silence	Vasiliki	Main role, 60 episodes	
2017	The Classmates	Lydia	30 episodes	
2021–2024	Sasmos	Vasiliki Kastrinaki Stamataki	Lead role, 496 episodes	
2024–2025	Revenge Games		Lead role, 60 episodes	

=== Film ===
Year	Title	Role	Notes	Ref.
1999	Hungry Eyes		Film debut	
2000	Wrong Century	Maria		
2001	One day at night	Electra		
2001	The stomach of the bee			
2002	The king	Maria		
2003	Storyteller		short film	
2006	A heroe in Rome	Americana		
