= Nikos Grammatikos =

Greek handball player and coach (born 1969)

Personal information
- Nationality: Greek
- Born: 13 October 1969 (age 57) Piraeus, Greece

Sport
- Sport: Handball
- Position: Center back

Senior clubs
- Years: Team
- –1986: Kichreas Salaminas
- 1986–1990: ESN Vrilissia
- 1990–1993: Ionikos Nea Filadelfeia
- 1993–1997: ESN Vrilissia
- 1997–1999: TSV Friedberg
- 1999–2000: HSG Düsseldorf
- 2000–2002: ASE Douka
- 2002–2003: Athens College
- 2003–2004: Panellinios
- 2004–2005: Pfadi Winterthur
- 2005–2006: Panellinios
National team
- Years: Team
- 1990–2006: Greece

Teams managed
- 2005: Pfadi Winterthur
- 2007–2010: Panellinios
- 2007–2010: Greece (youth)
- 2010–2011: ESN Vrilissia
- 2013–2016: Poseidon Loutrakiou
- 2016–2018: Greece
- 2017–2019: AEK Athens
- 2020–2022: Olympiacos (youth)
- 2022–2024: Olympiacos

Nikos Grammatikos (Greek: Νίκος Γραμματικός; born 13 October 1969) is a Greek former handball player and current coach. He competed at the 2004 Summer Olympics and at the 2005 World Championship.
