= Giorgos Xylouris =

Greek musician

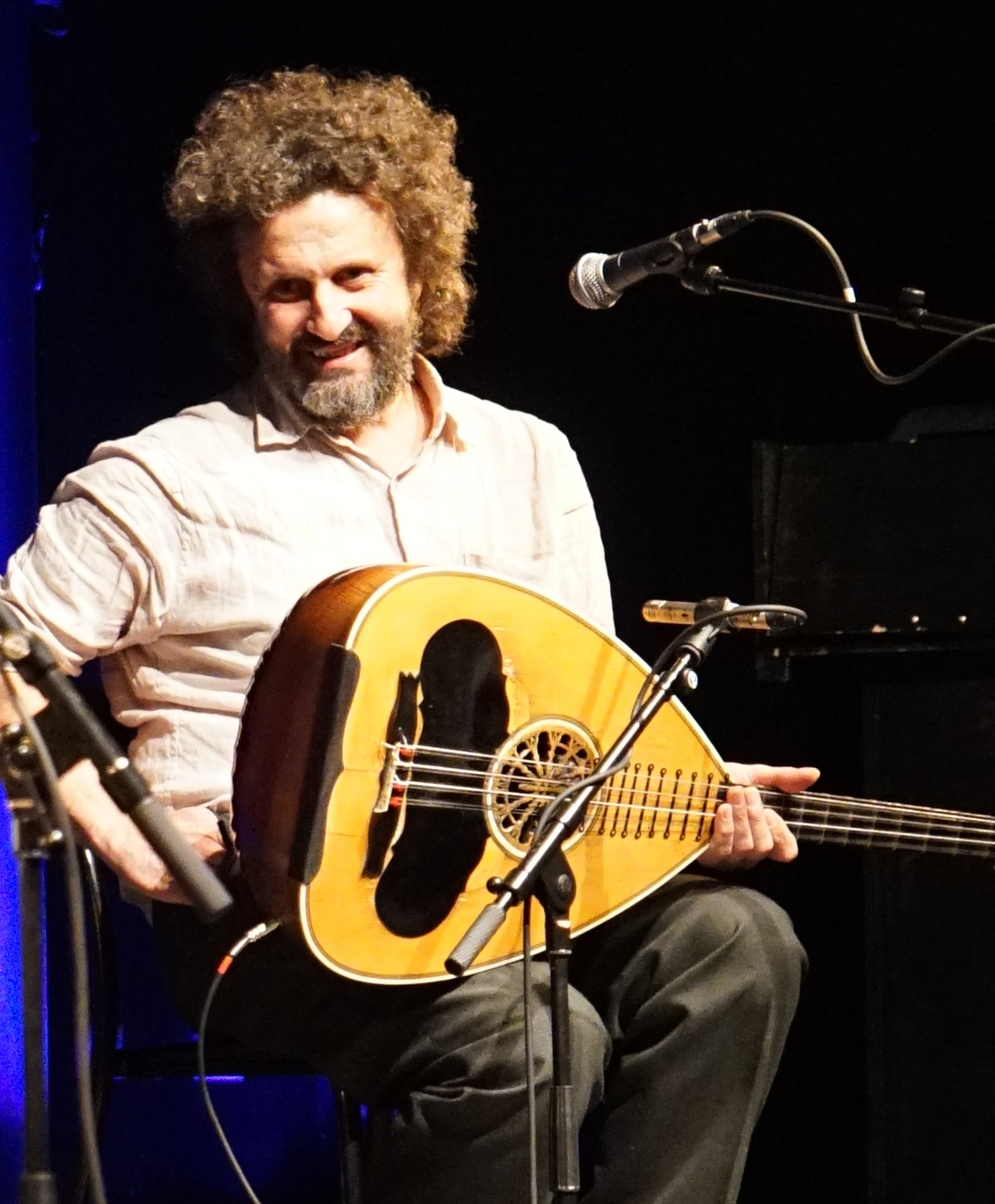

Background information
- Born: September 25, 1965 (age 61)
- Origin: Anogeia, Crete, Greece
- Occupation: Musician
- Instrument: Laouto
- Member of: Xylouris White

Giorgos "George" Xylouris (Greek: Γιώργoς Ξυλούρης, born September 25, 1965), also known as Psarogiorgis (Greek: Ψαρογιώργης), is a Cretan laouto player and singer.

Xylouris was born into a musical family (his father is Psarantonis (Antonis Xylouris), himself born in 1937; his uncle Nikos Xylouris (1936-1980); his cousin -Nikos's son- Giorgis Xylouris (1960-2015), etc.?), and he grew up in Anogeia, their mountain village in Crete, with a rich musical culture. Xylouris started playing the Cretan laouto, a relative of the lute, at an early age, guided by his uncle Psarogiannis. From eleven years old, he would accompany his father at village functions, and participate in recordings. Giorgos lived for eight years in Melbourne, Australia, where he formed the Xylouris Ensemble "in the early 1990s". Two of the Xylouris Ensemble's albums, Antipodes (1998) and Drakos (1999), were nominated for the ARIA Fine Arts Awards in Australia. The Xylouris Ensemble later expanded to include a younger generation of players, including Psarogiorgis' sons Nikos and Adonis Xylouris. Nikos and Adonis also perform in the punk rock band Frenzee alongside their sister Apollonia.

Xylouris plays the laouto as a solo instrument, in contrast to the traditional accompaniment role the laouto has in Cretan music. Normally in an ensemble, the laouto provides the rhythmic backing to the lyra, which is par excellence a singer's instrument. In the less usual role of lead instrument he has made the laouto a melodic instrument to frame and adorn song.

Xylouris has performed extensively both in his native Crete, in his second home Australia, and internationally at world music festivals, collaborating with musicians from both folk and rock traditions, including Australian drummer Jim White in the duo Xylouris White, and with Bill Callahan and Bonnie "Prince" Billy on their 2021 album Blind Date Party.

== Discography ==
=== Albums ===
Title	Details
Xylouris Ensemble	Released: 1995
Daphne	Released: 1996
Antipodes	Released: 1998; Label: Hi-Gloss Records
Drakos	Released: 1999; Label: Hi-Gloss Records
Antipodes 2	Released: 2002; Label: Σείστρον
Live in Melbourne	Released: 2010; Label: Xylouris Ensemble
In a Strange Land / Επί Γης Αλλοτρίας	Released: 2011

=== See also ===
- Xylouris White

== Awards and nominations ==
=== ARIA Music Awards ===
The ARIA Music Awards is an annual awards ceremony that recognises excellence, innovation, and achievement across all genres of Australian music. They commenced in 1987.

Year	Nominee / work	Award	Result	Ref.
1998	Antipodes	Best World Music Album	Nominated	
1999	Drakos	Best World Music Album	Nominated	
