= Rizitika =

Rizitika songs (Greek: Ριζίτικα τραγούδια) are the oldest type of Cretan music. They mainly originate from Western Crete, but are also widespread in central and eastern Crete. Rizes (ρίζες 'roots') are the foothills of the mountains. One view says that from the roots of the mountains those songs took their name, from Ida, Dikti and the White Mountains. Another view argues that «the songs of the roots» of the ancestors, were called by the people Rizitika. Today, Rizitika considered all those songs of unknown artists that came to our day through tradition from past centuries.

«Ἀγρίμια κι΄ἀγριμάκια μου ΄λάφια μου ΄μερωμένα πεστέ μου ποῦ 'ν οἱ τόποι σας καὶ ποῦ 'ν τὰ χειμαδιά σας; Γκρεμνὰ 'ν ἐμᾷς οἱ τόποι μας; λέσκες τὰ χειμαδιά μας τὰ σπηλιαράκια του βουνού είναι τὰ γονικά μας.»	«Ferals, my little ferals my tamed deers tell me, where are your lands and where are your shelters?: Cliffs are our lands; gorges are our shelters the little caves of the mountains are our ancestral estates.»

== Description ==
Rizitika songs commonly have no conventional names, and are instead referred to by with their first verse, or with some other verse. Rizika are generally not danced, and additionally they are traditionally divided into songs της τάβλας and της στράτας. Παπαγεωργιωράκης Ιδομενέας in his book Τα Κρητικά ριζίτικα τραγούδια, classified them in 32 melodies, and found 31 songs to have their own unique melodies, always on major scales. Their music is serious, typically a singer first sings a verse, which is usually repeated chorally. This does not always happen, however. The songs do not always need to rhyme, and the verse does not always have fifteen syllables.

== Songs ==
Digenes is a monument of the Cretan music and for many the epitome of the Acritic circle, its lyrics are considered flawless. It presents the supernatural aspect that endue Digenes, not with feats and achievements, but by misplacing the feeling of fear. Men are terrified at the sight of the earth that is about to welcome them, and shudders at the sight of the grave slab that is about cover them, in the case of Digenes those feelings are misplaced. As he is dying, he does not ask for divine help to take him to heaven and relieve him of his misery, but he wishes to climb there on his own.

«Ὁ Διγενὴς ψυχομαχεῖ, κι ἡ γῆς τόνε τρομάσσει κι ἡ πλάκα τὸν ἀνατριχιᾶ, πὼς θὰ τόνε σκεπάση; Γιατί από `κειά που κοίτεται, λόγια ἀντρειωμένου λέει.: Νά 'χεν ἡ γῆς πατήματα, κι΄ ὁ οὐρανός κερκέλια; νὰ πάτου τὰ πατήματα, νά `πιανα τὰ κερκέλια ν' ἀνέβαινα 'ς τὸν οὐρανό, νὰ διπλωθῶ νὰ κάτσω νὰ δώσω σεῖσμα τ' οὐρανοῦ.»	«Digenes is dying, and the earth is terrified and the grave slab shudders, how she is gonna cover him? Because from where he lies, mighty words he utters.: If the earth had treads and the sky had grips I would step on the treads, I would grab on the grips; to climb up to the sky, to fold there and sit to shake the heavens.»

A historical song about the Cretan War of 1644-1669 testifies the discord among the Christians during the war, and in short explains the numerous converts to Islam that followed the fall of the castle in 1669.

«Κάστρο και ποῦ 'ν' οἱ πύργοι σου καὶ τὰ καμπαναργιά σου καὶ πού 'ν' οἱ γιἀντριωμένοι σου, τὰ ὄμορφα παλληκάργια; Μα μένα οἱ γιἀντριωμένοι μου, τὰ ὄμορφα παλληκάργια, ἡ μαύρη γῆς τὰ χαίρεται 'ς τὸ μαυρισμένο 'Αδη. Δὲν ἔχω ἀμάχη τσῆ τουρκιᾶς, μήδε κακιὰ τοῦ χάρου, μόνο 'χω ἀμάχη και κακιὰ τοῦ σκύλου τοῦ προδότη ἁπού μοῦ τὰ κατάδουδε.»	«Castle, where are your towers and your belfrys and where are your braves, your fine lads? My own braves, the fine lads of mine the black earth enjoys them, in the stygian Hades. I have no wrath for turkish, neither rage for Charon, I only have wrath and rage for the traitor who betrayed them»

One of the oldest Rizitika which considered quite strange is the following. Νίκος Καβρουλάκης believes that it has its roots in the era of the emirate of Crete. He also speculates that it may be missing verses that could give it another meaning.

«Ἀπέστειλε με βασιληᾶς τσὶ βίγλες νὰ μπαστίσω κι οὗλες τσὶ βίγλες μπάστισα, κι οὗλες λαγόνεψά τσι κι οὗλες τσὶ βρῇκα ξυπνητὲς, και τσι παραφυλάγαν τὴ βίγλα τῶ Σαρακηνῶ ηὕρηκα κι ἁκοιμᾶτο ξύπνα λουβοσαρακηνέ!»	«King sent me to rebuke the watchtowers and all the watchtowers I rebuke, and have them all patrolled and found them all awaked and had them passed by only the watchtower of the Saracans I found it asleep wake up louvosaracan!»

Βίγλες, from the Latin vigilare, were small settlements at the mountain peaks supervising coasts that were considered dangerous for landing of invaders. The meaning of λουβο- of the word λουβοσαρακηνός seems to have been lost in time.

The following song is the most well-known Rizitiko outside Crete; its subject is a 16th-century vendetta, among possibly the family of Γιάνναρης, and the one of Μουσούρος, whom the song refers to in all of its variants. Μουσούρος family and their place of residence are also mentioned in Venetian sources of the 16th century, not with good comments. The earliest version of the song was as following:

«Χριστὲ νὰ ζώνουμουν σπαθὶ, καὶ νᾄπιανα κοντάρι νὰ πρόβαινα 'ς τὸν Ὁμαλὸ, 'ς τὴ στράτα τῶ Μουσούρω νὰ σύρω τἀργυρὸ σπαθὶ καὶ τὸ χρυσὸ κοντάρι νὰ κάμω μάνες δίχως γιούς, γυναῖκες δίχως ἄντρες.»	«Jesus, I will gird the sword and I will grab the spear I will step down to Ομαλός to the passage of Μουσούρος to pull out the silver sword and the golden spear to make mothers without sons, women without men.»

The song became known in Greece in the following form and was associated with the wars and struggles in mainland Greece of the 20th century.

«Πότε θὰ κάμη ξαστεριά, πότε θὰ φλεβαρίση νὰ πάρω τὸ ντουφέκι μου, τὴν ὄμορφη πατρώνα νὰ κατεβῶ 'ς τὸν Ὁμαλό, 'ς τὴ στράτα τῶ Μουσούρω νὰ κάμω μάννες δίχως γιούς, γυναῖκες δίχως ᾄντρες.»	«When will be starry skies, when will be February to take my rifle, the beautiful bandolier to step down to Ομαλός, to the passage of Μουσούρος to make mothers without sons, women without men.»

== Sources ==
- Καβρουλάκης, Νίκος (1967), Οι ρίζες των ριζίτικων τραγουδιών, publisher: Πέτρος Κ. Ράνος

== Bibliography ==
- Το Ηράκλειον και ο Νομός του, εκδ. Νομ. Ηρακλείου.
- Βλαζάκης Μιχαήλ, Ριζίτικα Τραγούδια Κρήτης, Χανιά, 1961.
- Παπαγρηγοράκη Ιδομενέως, Τα Κρητικά ριζίτικα τραγούδια, Χανιά 1957.
- Mανώλης Γασπαράκης,Tο ιδανικό της προσωπικής αρετής στο ριζίτικο τραγούδι: προτροπή για αρετή,Κρητολογικά Γράμματα, τόμ. 13 (1997), pp. 319–325
