= Nikos Xilouris =

Greek singer and composer (1936–1980)

Nikos Xylouris Νίκος Ξυλούρης
- Portrait of Nikos Xylouris, Greek singer and composer, known for his Cretan and Éntekhno music.

Background information
- Born: 7 July 1936; Anogeia, Kingdom of Greece
- Died: 8 February 1980 (aged 43) Piraeus, Greece
- Genres: Cretan music; Éntekhno
- Occupations: Singer; musician; composer
- Instrument: Cretan lyra
- Years active: 1950–1980
- Spouse: Ourania Melampianakis

Nikos Xylouris (Greek: Νίκος Ξυλούρης; 7 July 1936 – 8 February 1980), also known as Psaronikos (Ψαρονίκος), was a Greek singer, Cretan lyra player, and songwriter who performed both Cretan rural traditional and urban orchestral music arrangements.

== Early life and education ==
Nikos Xylouris was born on 7 July 1936, in Anogeia, a village on the slopes of Mount Ida as the fourth child and first son of Giorgos Xylouris; his younger brothers, Antonis Xylouris, or Psarantonis (Greek: Ψαραντώνης), and Giannis Xylouris, or Psarogiannis (Greek: Ψαρογιάννης), are also familiar figures in Cretan music.

Xylouris' nickname "Psaronikos" – derives from the Greek psaro (ψαρο) meaning "fish-like", combined with his given name Nikos – which was inherited from his grandfather Antonis. According to Xylouris' family history, his grandfather took part in the Greek Revolution of 1821 and was said to "consume the Turks as if they were fish". The nickname was then passed down along the male line of the family, with each generation's given name substituting that of Antonis, while the prefix psaro- (ψαρο) remained.

After the razing of Anogeia during World War II, the Xylouris family and other residents of the area fled to villages in the Mylopotamos region. Nearly a year after the razing, the damage inflicted upon Anogeia was documented by a scientific committee officially appointed by the newly restored Greek government. The committee included writer Nikos Kazantzakis and Professor Ioannis Kakridis, remembered for their joint translation of the works of Homer.

== Career ==
At the age of twelve, Xylouris obtained his first instrument, a Cretan lyra, after Xylouris's father, who was against his son turning to music, was convinced by a local schoolteacher and by Xylouris' persistence.

Following an apprenticeship under lyre player Leonidas Klados, Xylouris started performing at social functions and local festivities, accompanied by his brother Giannis on the lute. In 1953, at the age of 17, Xylouris moved from Anogeia to Heraklion. There, Nikos performed at the venue "Kastron" (Greek: Κάστρον).

Xylouris' first studio recording in 1958 was a 7-inch 45 rpm vinyl single featuring "Μια μαυροφόρα όταν περνά" (When a black-clad woman passes by) and "Δεν κλαίνε οι δυνατές καρδιές" (Strong hearts don't cry). Although Odeon Records granted them an audition, executives were worried that Cretan music lacked commercial potential and initially rejected the release; however, Pavlos Vardinogiannis (an MP of Crete at the time) intervened, vouching for Xylouris and promising to reimburse Odeon for every unsold unit. Following this initial reluctance, the recording of a single featuring Nikos with backing vocals from his wife, Ourania, was sanctioned. The recording is said to be of a significant success, vindicating Vardinogiannis' support for Xylouris. While additional singles were subsequently released through Odeon, the label's executives remained hesitant about Xylouris and the commercial viability of Cretan music.

In 1967, Xylouris helped establish the first exclusively Cretan folk music hall in Heraklion, named Erotokritos, by catering to rural Cretans visiting the city. Over time, Xylouris gained renown as a musician in Heraklion.

The turning point in his career came in 1969, when Columbia Records released his most successful single to date, a 7-inch 45 rpm featuring “Anyfantou” (Greek: Ανυφαντού, “Weaveress”) and “Kavgades me to giasemi” (Greek: Καβγάδες με το γιασεμί, “Quarrels with the Jasmine”). Following its success, Xylouris began performing in Athens, later establishing a permanent residency there. Though musicologist Simon Karas criticised “Anyfantou” and questioned Xylouris’ interpretation of traditional songs, the Hellenic Broadcasting Corporation later featured the piece in a special broadcast, affirming its status within Greek folk music.

== Later life ==
Two accounts describe Xylouris’ introduction to the Athenian musical establishment. According to one version, his career advanced through early performances at the Konaki Cretan Folk Music Hall, where Cretan musicians were invited to entertain the city’s Cretan community. During one of these performances, Xylouris met film director Errikos Thalassinos, who introduced him to composer Yannis Markopoulos. The meeting led to a collaboration between Markopoulos and Xylouris that lasted nearly a decade.

An alternative account, supported by Xylouris’s wife Ourania, attributes his discovery to Takis Lambropoulos, head of Columbia Records Greece. Lambropoulos reportedly first heard Xylouris singing at a wedding in Crete, recorded him live, and sent the tape to composer Stavros Xarchakos in Paris. Xarchakos and Xylouris later developed both a close friendship and a partnership that extended into theatre.

Xylouris collaborated with additional composers and conductors, such as Christodoulos Chalaris, Christos Leontis, and Linos Kokotos, performing poetry by Nikos Gatsos, Yannis Ritsos, Giorgos Seferis, Kostas Varnalis, Dionysios Solomos, Vitsentzos Kornaros, Kostas Karyotakis, Rigas Feraios, Kostas Kindynis, and Kostas Georgousopoulos (a.k.a. Kostas Myris).

Xylouris relocated to Athens during the Greek military junta of 1967–1974, which came to power after the coup d'état of April 21, 1967. Cretan traditional songs, especially Rizitika, were repurposed to voice opposition against the Junta and express longing for its demise. Xylouris used these songs to attempt to empower students rebelling against the dictatorship and stood by their side during the Athens Polytechnic School Uprising of 1973 by singing songs banned by the Junta, alongside Stavros Xarchakos. Xylouris' songs were banned from radio and television, and he was summoned to the headquarters of the Greek Military Police. The venues he appeared in were monitored by operatives of the government.

The theater company of Tzeni Karezi and Kostas Kazakos commissioned playwright Iakovos Kambanellis, a survivor of the Mauthausen concentration camp and later member of the Academy of Athens, to write a retrospective of modern Greek history, scored by Xarchakos, who offered Xylouris the part of the main singer. The result was the play "To Megalo Mas Tsirko" (Greek: Το Μεγάλο μας Τσίρκο, "Our Great Circus"), staged at the Athinaion Theater, which enjoyed success. Slogans used in the play, such as Psomi – Paideia – Eleftheria (Bread – Education – Freedom, Greek: Ψωμί – Παιδεία – Ελευθερία) and Foni Laou – Orgi Theou (Voice of the People – Wrath of God, Greek: Φωνή Λαού – Οργή Θεού) were adopted by protesting university students, consequently became linked with their uprising, and found their way into the Greek Nation's collective consciousness after the restoration of Democratic rule in 1974.

Following this restoration of democracy, Xylouris released additional albums with Markopoulos and Xarchakos and continued to make live appearances and concerts. In the days after the fall of the Junta, he participated in the liberation concert Tragoudia tis Fotias (Greek: Τραγούδια της Φωτιάς, Songs of Fire) by director Nikos Koundouros, before an Athenian audience.

== Public and critical acclaim ==
In 1966, Xylouris represented Greece at the San Remo Music Festival and won first prize in its Folk Music Section. In 1971, he was awarded the Grand Prix du Disque by the Académie Charles-Cros in France for his performance of the Cretan Rizitika album with Yannis Markopoulos.

== Personal life ==
Xylouris met his future wife, Ourania Melampianakis, while performing at a festival in her native village of Venerato. Their initial interaction was limited to exchanging glances, in accordance with local courtship customs. Ourania belonged to an affluent family, while Xylouris was regarded as an itinerant musician. Although Cretan society did not strictly enforce class divisions, relationships perceived as socially unequal were generally frowned upon. In the following months, Xylouris would regularly serenade Ourania, continuing a long-standing Cretan tradition rooted in medieval Italian influence, where young men would sing to woo the women they admired.

Xylouris eventually proposed to Ourania. The couple eloped to Anogeia, where they held their wedding. Ourania was initially ostracized by her family for eloping, which left a lasting emotional impact on her. Reconciliation was later achieved after Xylouris’s musical career gained prominence. Her father ultimately consented to the marriage. The couple's love story echoes the Erotokritos by Vitsentzos Kornaros, select verses of which were sung by Xylouris in one of his albums.

The couple had two children, a son named Giorgis (George) and a daughter named Rinio (Irene). Xylouris and Ourania remained married until Xylouris' passing.

== Death and legacy ==
Nikos Xylouris died of lung cancer, which had metastasized to the brain, at Metaxa Cancer Hospital Piraeus, on 8 February 1980, at age 43. He was buried at the First Cemetery of Athens.

== Discography ==
Title	Greek	Year
Mia mavrofora otan perna	Μια μαυροφόρα όταν περνά	1958
Anyfantou	Ανυφαντού	1969
O Psaronikos	Ο Ψαρονίκος	1970
Mantinades kai Chorοi	Μαντινάδες και χοροί	1970
Chroniko	Χρονικό	1970
Rizitika	Ριζίτικα	1971
Dialeimma	Διάλειμμα	1972
Ithageneia	Ιθαγένεια	1972
Dionyse kalokairi mas	Διόνυσε καλοκαίρι μας	1972
O Tropikos tis Parthenou	Ο Τροπικός της Παρθένου	1973
O Xylouris tragouda yia tin Kriti	Ο Ξυλούρης τραγουδά για την Κρήτη	1973
O Stratis Thalassinos anamesa stous Agapanthous	Ο Στρατής Θαλασσινός ανάμεσα στους Αγάπανθους	1973
Perifani ratsa	Περήφανη ράτσα	1973
Akolouthia	Ακολουθία	1974
To megalo mas tsirko	Το μεγάλο μας τσίρκο	1974
Parastaseis	Παραστάσεις	1975
Anexartita	Ανεξάρτητα	1975
Komentia, i pali chorikon kai vasiliadon	Κομέντια, η πάλη χωρικών και βασιλιάδων	1975
Kapnismeno tsoukali	Καπνισμένο τσουκάλι	1975
Ta pou thymoumai tragoudo	Τα που θυμούμαι τραγουδώ	1975
Kyklos Seferi	Κύκλος Σεφέρη	1976
Erotokritos	Ερωτόκριτος	1976
I symfonia tis Gialtas kai tis pikris agapis	Η συμφωνία της Γιάλτας και της πικρής αγάπης	1976
I eleftheri poliorkimeni	Οι ελεύθεροι πολιορκημένοι	1977
Ta erotika	Τα ερωτικά	1977
Ta Xyloureika	Τα Ξυλουρέικα	1978
Ta antipolemika	Τα αντιπολεμικά	1978
Salpisma	Σάλπισμα	1978
14 Chryses Epitichies	14 Χρυσές Επιτυχίες	1978

== Posthumously released material ==
Title	Greek	Year
Teleftaia ora Kriti	Τελευταία ώρα Κρήτη	1981
Nikos Xylouris	Νίκος Ξυλούρης	1982
Pantermi Kriti	Πάντερμη Κρήτη	1983
O Deipnos o Mystikos	Ο Δείπνος ο Μυστικός	1984
Stavros Xarchakos: Theatrika	Σταύρος Ξαρχάκος: Θεατρικά	1985
O Yiannis Markopoulos ston Elliniko Kinematografo	Ο Γιάννης Μαρκόπουλος στον Ελληνικό Κινηματογράφο	1988
I synavlia sto Irodio 1976	Η συναυλία στο Ηρώδειο 1976	1990
To chroniko tou Nikou Xylouri	Το χρονικό του Νίκου Ξυλούρη	1996
Nikos Xylouris	Νίκος Ξυλούρης	2000
I psychi tis Kritis	Η ψυχή της Κρήτης	2002
Itane mia fora...	Ήτανε μια φορά...	2005
Tou Chronou Ta Girismata	Του Χρόνου Τα Γυρίσματα	2005
Itane Mia Fora... Kai Emeine Gia Panta!	Ήτανε Μια Φορά... Και Έμεινε Για Πάντα!	2017

== See also ==
- Music of Crete
