= Laouto =

Fretted instrument of the lute family

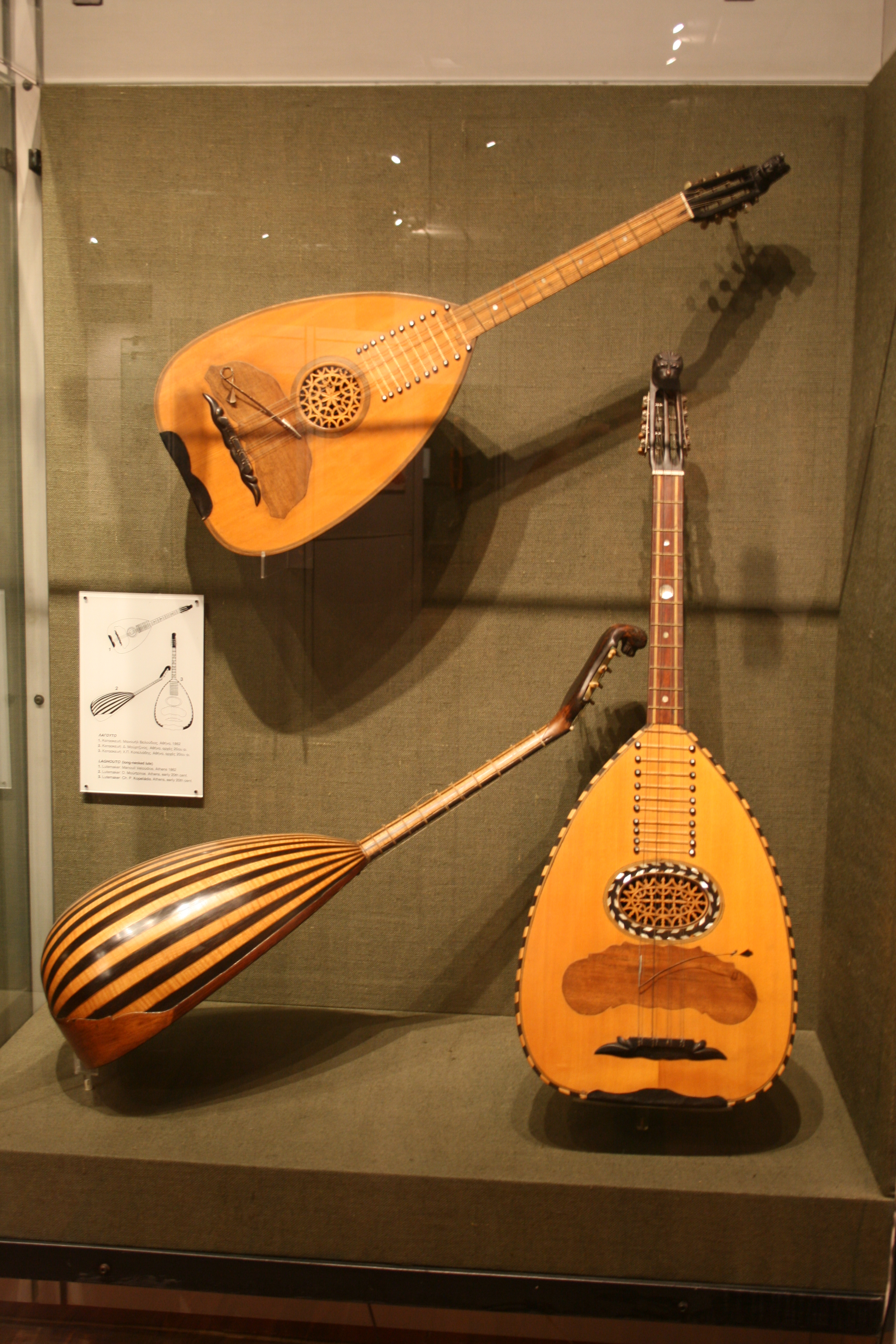
- Different kinds of laouto, from the 19th and 20th centuries

String instrument
- Other names: λαούτο
- Classification: Necked bowl lutes; String instruments
- Hornbostel–Sachs classification: 321.321 (Composite chordophone sounded with a plectrum)

Related instruments
- Barbat (lute), Bağlama, Biwa, Bouzouki, Dombra, Domra, Dutar, Lavta, Lute, Mandocello, Mandola, Mandolin, Mandolute, Oud, Pipa, Qanbus

Σαν απόκληρος γυρίζω Χάρης & Αναστασία
- Example of Laouto playing with a singer

The laouto (Greek: λαούτο, pl. laouta λαούτα) is a long-neck fretted instrument of the lute family, found in Greece and Cyprus, and similar in appearance to the oud. It has four double-strings. It is played in most respects like the oud (plucked with a long plectrum); in Cyprus the laouto is plucked with a feather. This instrument is known in Albania as "llautë" (indefinite form) or "llauta" (definite form), and in Romania as "lăuta".

== Construction ==
Unlike the oud and other short-necked lutes, the laouto has a higher string tension due to its steel strings and longer neck, and hence it is brighter in tone than the oud. It also has movable frets to permit the playing of the dromoi, or modes of Greek traditional music. The laouto also tends to have only one sound hole (sometimes two) whereas the oud family tend to have three. Despite this, there are many similarities between the laouto and the oud.

The soundboard is often made of spruce or cedar wood, while the body is usually made of a harder wood such as maple or walnut. This is a practice consonant with the construction of other (round-backed) lutes.

The 11 frets of the neck are removable (and can be re-positioned for differing intervals) and made of nylon (resembling the gut/nylon frets of the lute). Up to 9 wooden frets, mounted on the soundboard, are fixed. The intervals of the frets may be more frequent than that of a guitar to permit the playing of maqams.

The strings of the laouto were traditionally of gut, although modern laoutos have also steel (or steel wound nylon) strings similar to those of the bouzouki.

== Tuning ==
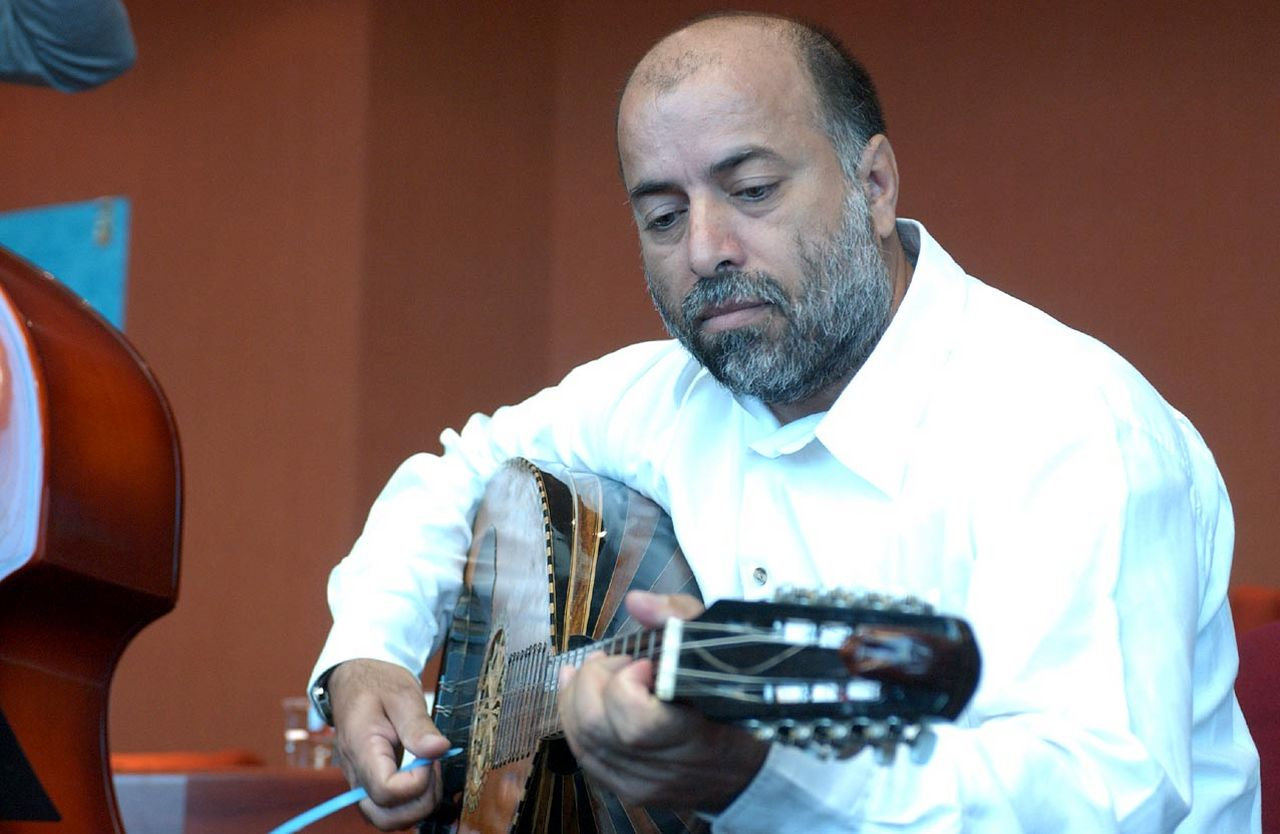
Evagoras Karageorgis from Cyprus playing a laouto

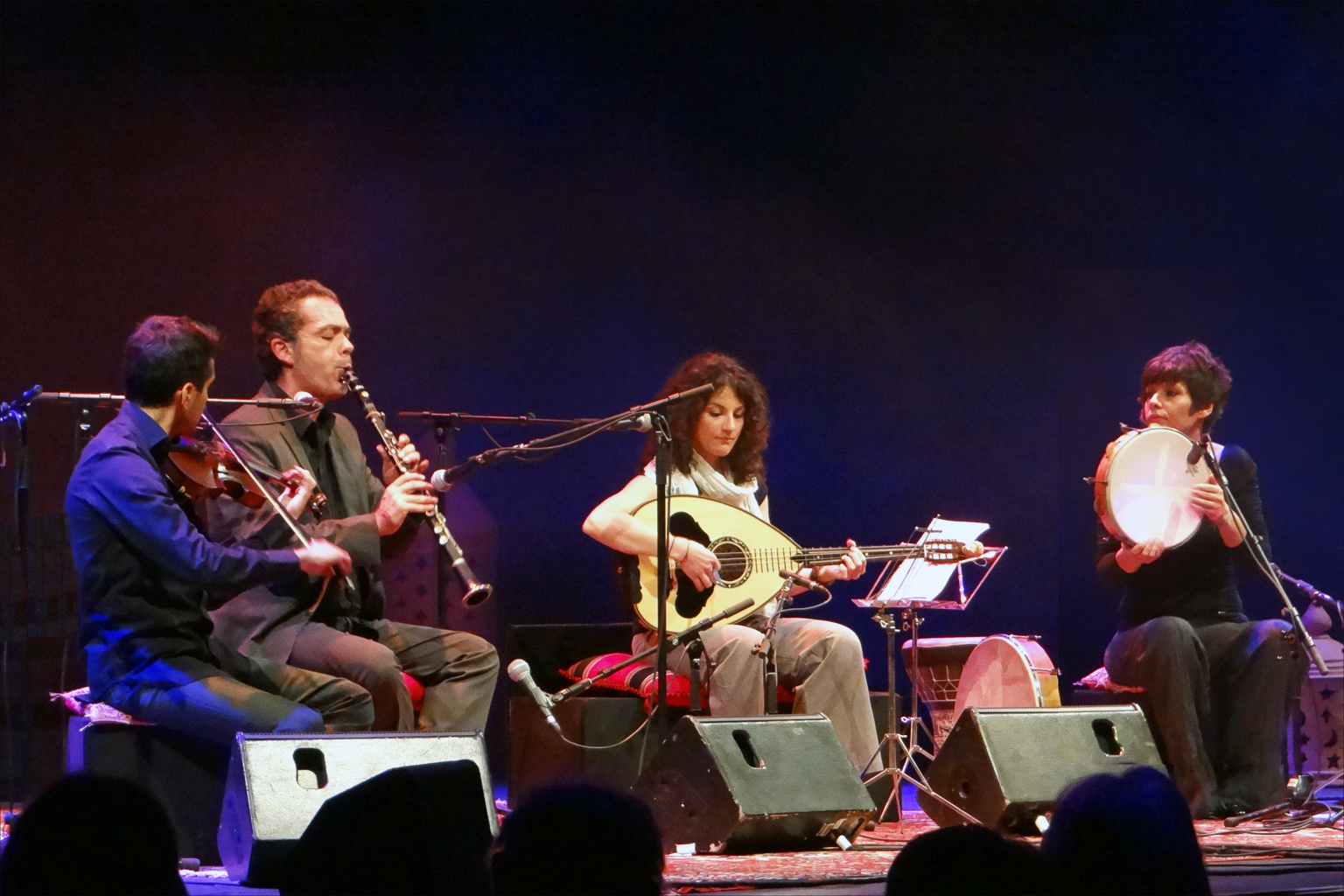
Maria Ploumi playing a laouto as part of an ensemble

Except for the first (A4A4) strings, which are tuned in unison, the laouto's other strings are paired, tuned an octave apart. The interval from one pair to the next is tuned in fifths (C3C4-G3G4-D3D4-A4A4). The Laouto has a re-entrant tuning, G3G4 tuned a fourth lower than C3C4.

The two primary contemporary variants of the laouto, one somewhat smaller than the other, are to be found on mainland Greece (steriano laouto) and on the island of Crete (Cretan laouto). The larger sized instrument (wider body) is played mainly on the island of Crete and tends to be tuned differently (G2G3 - D2D3 - A2A3 - E3E3), the re-entrant tuning is still a characteristic of the Cretan laouto (or lagouto (Greek: λαγούτο)), because D2D3 is a fourth lower than G2G3. In Cyprus, Cypriot laouto is tuned C - G - D - A.

The role of the laouto in Greek traditional music is primarily that of accompaniment. The laouto is often played in a duo (the one laouto tuned more bass than the other) with the Cretan lyra or with the violin (in Cyprus).

== Notable players ==
- Giannis Haroulis
- Evagoras Karageorgis
- Vasilis Kostas
- Thanasis Papakonstantinou
- Yiannis Xylouris, also known as Psaroyiannis
- Giorgos Xylouris
- Christos Zotos
- Thor Algren
- Maria Ploumi
- Giorgos Manolakis
- Dimitris Sideris
- Nikos Aggrlopoulos
- Apostolos Valsamas
- Dimitris Pelitaris

== See also ==
- Lavta (Politiko laouto)
- Gusle (referred to as lahutë in Albanian)

== Literature ==
- Tole, Vasil (2014), Enciklopedia e iso-polifonisë popullore shqiptare (in Albanian)
