= Bustan Abraham =

World music band from Israel

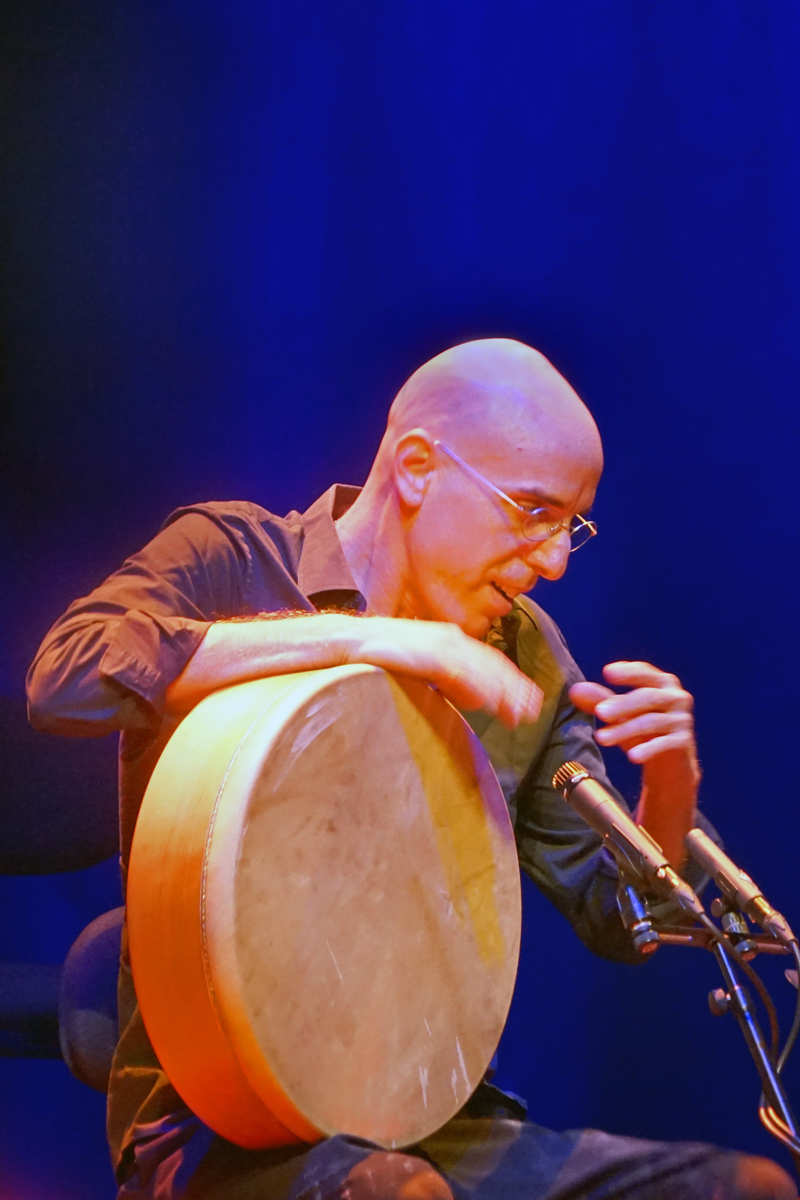
Zohar Fresco of Bustan Avraham

Bustan Abraham (Hebrew: בוסתן אברהם) was an Israeli band playing mostly instrumental music, which existed between 1991 and 2003. Its name means "Abraham’s garden"; the reference to the common ancestor of both Jewish and Islamic traditions intending to imply a unifying theme. The band was called a pioneer in the realm of world music.

== History ==
The band was born of jam sessions organized during several months by the qanun player and music promoter Avshalom Farjun, in collaboration with the violin and oud player Taiseer Elias. These sessions brought together musicians with various musical backgrounds such as Arab music, Turkish music, jazz, flamenco, western classical music, and blues. Eight musicians finally stayed to form Bustan Abraham. They made their debut at the Israeli International Arts Festival. The band was collaborative: each member brought his own ideas and composed part of the repertoire, and although it was composed mainly of Israeli Jewish musicians, two of its members were Palestinians.

Thank to this mix, it was perceived as a symbol of bringing the two groups together. The members nevertheless always insisted on the fact that their approach was foremost a musical one. Their aim was to drag from different traditions to create an entirely new music.

In the years which followed the signing of the Oslo agreements, the group played in numerous concerts and festivals in Europe, Asia and United States. It also recorded with musicians of different backgrounds, like Ross Daly, Hariprasad Chaurasia, Keyvan Chemirani and Zakir Hussain. Their albums generally sold about 25 0000 copies each. Three of Bustan Abraham’s members, (Taiseer Elias, Zohar Fresco and Nassim Dakwar also performed in trio with a more specifically Arabo-Turkish repertoire, under the name of Zyriab Trio. Taiseer Elias and Miguel Herstein performed in duo under the name White Bird.

After Benjamin Netanyahu became Prime Minister, in 1996, and even more after the beginning of the Second Intifada, in 2000, invitations abroad became scarcer. The band finally disbanded in 2003, as different viewpoints had emerged on the musical direction to take and as several of its musicians were increasingly busy with other projects.

Some of its members kept on playing together on an occasional basis and four of them formed a new band at the end of 2011, Bustan Quartet. They performed in festivals in the United States and in Israel.

== Members ==
=== Permanent members ===
- Yehuda Siliki – saz, until 1993, voice as a guest on the album Pictures through the Painted Window
- Emmanuel Mann – electric bass, until 1999
- Amir Milstein – western flute
- Taiser Elias – oud
- Miguel Herstein – guitar, banjo
- Nassim Dakwar – violin
- Avshalom Farjun – qanun
- Naor Carmi – double bass, from 1999 on
- Zohar Fresco – derbouka, riqq, daf and voice.

=== Guest musicians ===
- Daniela Buchbinder – Cello (Pictures through the Painted Window)
- Miranda Elias – voice (Pictures through the Painted Window)
- Lea Avraham – voice (Pictures through the Painted Window)
- Ross Daly – laouto, lyra, rebab (Abadai)
- Socrates Sinopoulos – kemençe (Abadai)
- Keyvan Chemirani – zarb (Abadai)
- Zakir Hussain – tabla (Fanar)
- Hariprasad Chaurasia – bansuri (Fanar)
- Achinoam Nini a.k.a. Noa – voice (Fanar)
- Gil Dor – guitar (Fanar)
- Kroitor Emil – accordion (Fanar)
- Kroitor Alexander – violin (Fanar)
- Albert Piamenta – clarinet and bass clarinet (Fanar)
- Avraham Salman – qanun, only during concerts

=== Bustan Quartet ===
- Emmanuel Mann – electric bass
- Amir Milstein – flute
- Taiser Elias – oud
- Zohar Fresco – drums
- Haggai Cohen Milo – double bass

== Discography ==
=== Bustan Abraham ===
- Bustan Abraham (1992)
- Pictures through the painted window (1994)
- Abadai (1996)
- Fanar (1997)
- Hamsa (2000)
- Ashra (2001), compilation released for the tenth anniversary of Bustan Abraham
- Live concerts (2003)

=== Zyriab Trio ===
- Mashreq Classics (1996)

== See also ==
- Israeli music
