= Mourtzana =

Village in Crete, Greece

Coordinates: 35°21′N 24°47′E

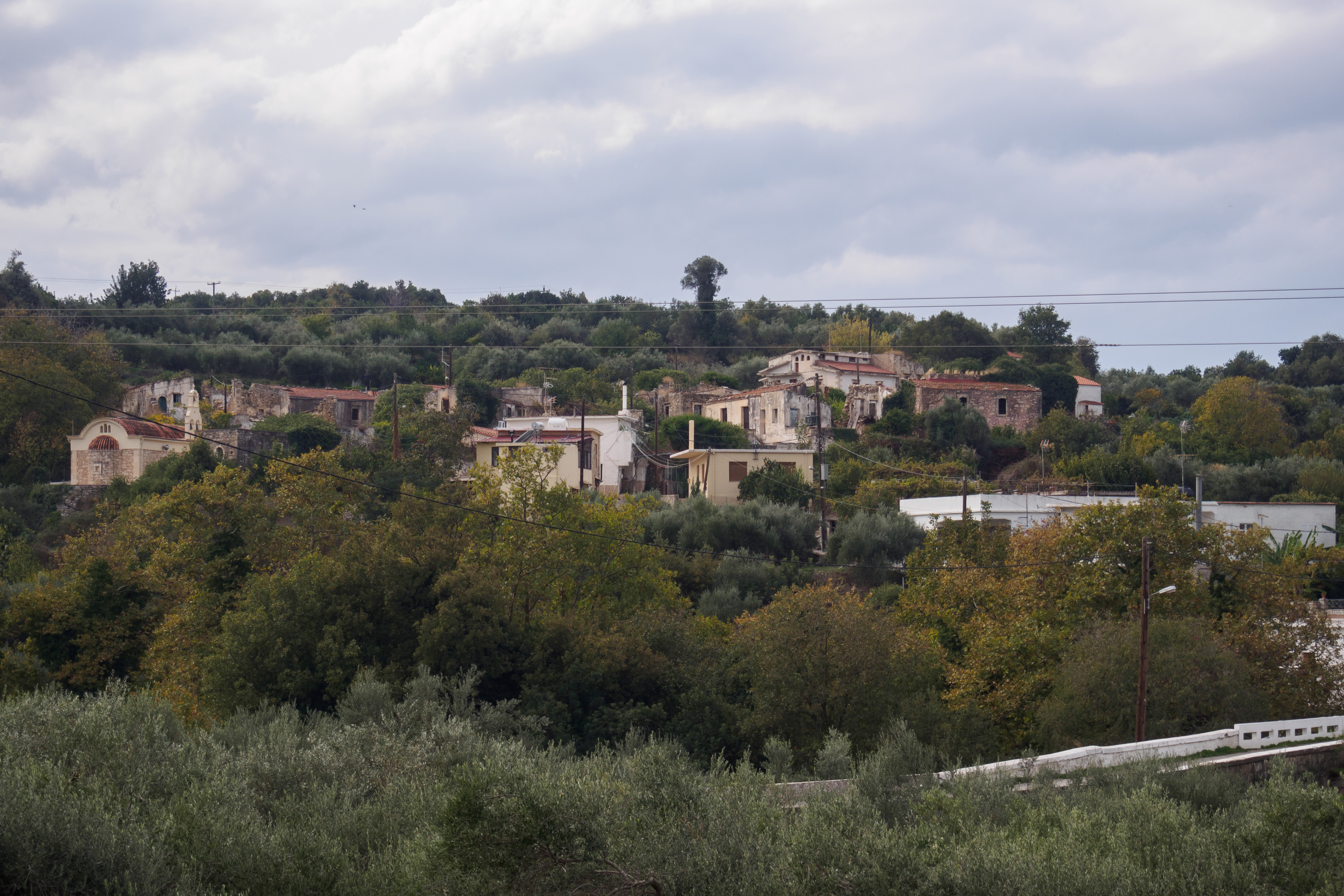
View of Mourtzana from east

Mourtzana (Greek: Μουρτζανά) is a village in Greece situated on the Old National Road Rethymno - Heraklion. It belongs to the community of Garazo in the municipal unit of Kouloukonas in Crete.

Mourtzana was built after the re-conquest of Crete by Nikiforos Fokas from the Saracens in 961 AD. The island was under the Saracens' rule for about 134 years. During that time, one of the main policies of the Byzantines was to re-Hellenize the island. Hence, many noble families were given lands for incentive that eventually became feudal villages named after the families.

Mourtzana was a village that was established by the Mourtzanos family.

The village is considered one of the richest in architecture in Mylopotamos, dated from Venetian rule. It was conquered by the Ottoman Turks who gave privileges to the Mourtzanos family by offering them the Turkish noble title "Agha."

== See also ==
- List of settlements in the Rethymno regional unit
