= Zohar Fresco =

Israeli musical artist

Zohar Fresco זוהר פרסקו
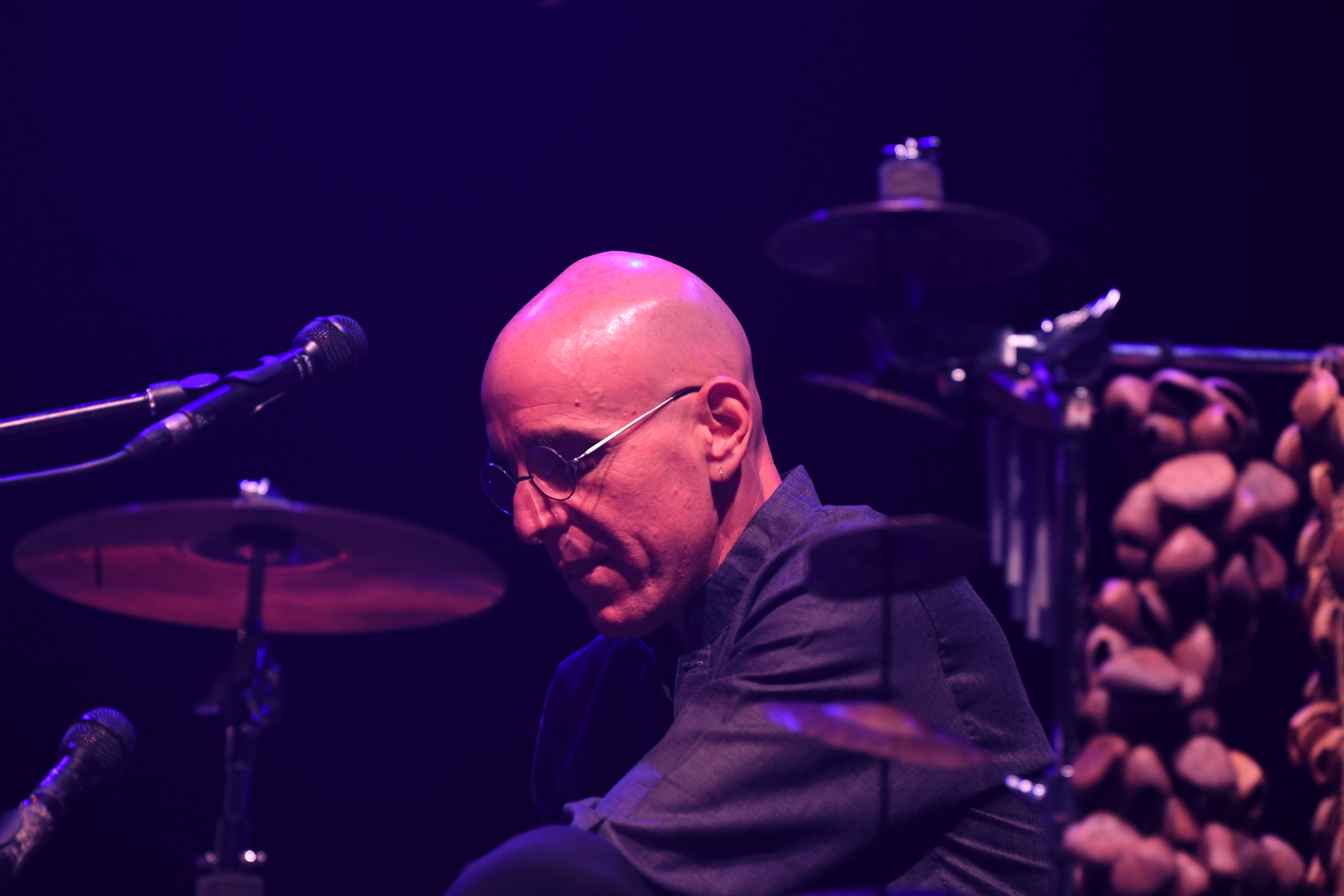
- Zohar Fresco, 2023

Background information
- Born: 1969 (age 56–57); Israel
- Genres: World music, ethno jazz, jazz
- Occupations: Musician, composer
- Instruments: Frame drum, percussion, vocals
- Years active: 1992-present
- Website: zoharfresco.com

Zohar Fresco (Hebrew: זוהר פרסקו; born 1969) is an Israeli percussionist and composer, specializing in the frame drum. He is known for his personal frame drum technique, which combines several different styles. He is a member of the jazz trio MOŻDŻER DANIELSSON FRESCO, together with Polish pianist Leszek Możdżer and Swedish double bass player Lars Danielsson. Previously, he was a member of the Israeli world music band Bustan Abraham, which existed between 1991 and 2003.

He has played with musicians including jazz drummer Hamid Drake, violinist Taiseer Elias, saxophonist Daniel Zamir and oud player Ara Dinkjian. He has toured with American composer Philip Glass.

== Selected discography ==
- Bustan Abraham with Bustan Abraham (1992)
- Pictures Through The Painted Window with Bustan Abraham (1994)
- Abadai with Bustan Abraham feat. Ross Daly (1996)
- Fanar with Bustan Abraham feat. Zakir Hussain and Hariprasad Chaurasia (1997)
- Mashreq Classics with Ziryab Trio (1997)
- Hamsa with Bustan Abraham (2000)
- Ashra with Bustan Abraham (2000)
- Live Concerts with Bustan Abraham (2004)
- The Time, with Leszek Możdżer and Lars Danielsson (2005)
- Between Us and the Light with Leszek Możdżer and Lars Danielsson (2006)
- An Armenian in America with Ara Dinkjian (2006)
- Napoli-Tel Aviv with Achinoam Nini and Gil Dor (2007)
- Live with Leszek Możdżer and Lars Danielsson (2007)
- Polska with Leszek Możdżer and Lars Danielsson (2013)
