= Karavitis =

Karavitis is a surname. Notable people with the surname include:

- Alekos Karavitis (1904–1975), Greek composer and singer
- Ioannis Karavitis (1883–1949), Greek leader
- Petros Karavitis (born 1952), Greek former international footballer and manager
