= Vosakou Monastery =

Former Greek Orthodox monastery in Crete

- Μονή Βωσάκου
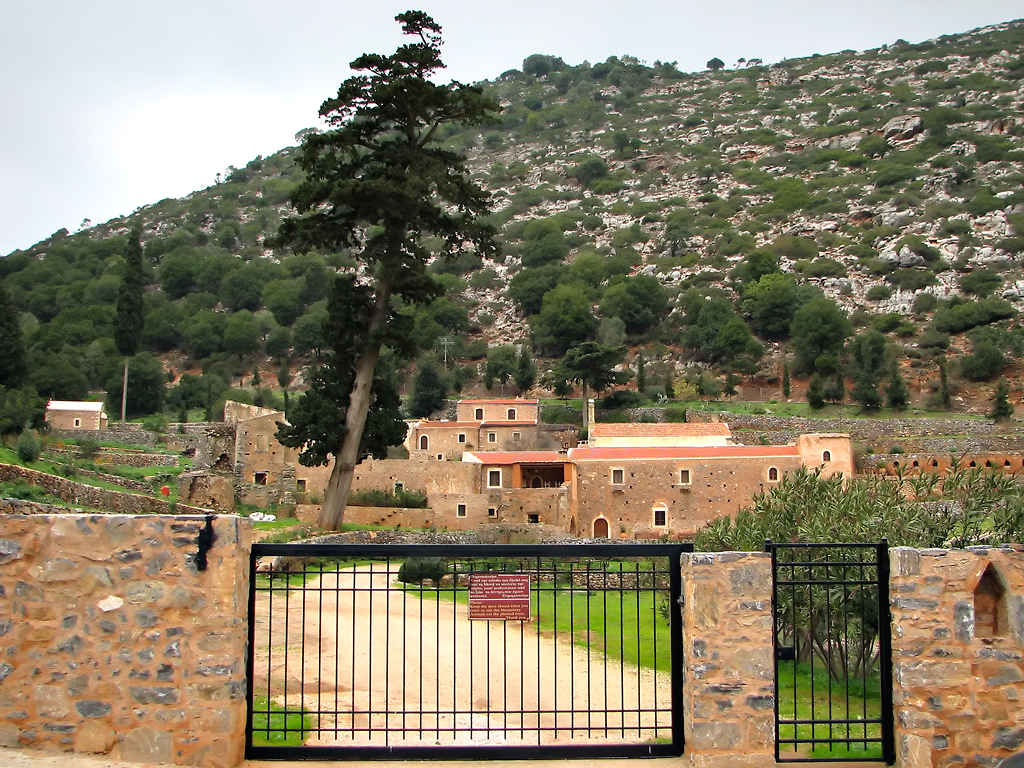
- View of the former monastery in 2007, with the imposing cypress tree

- Location of the former monastery in Crete
- Interactive map of Vosakou Monastery

Monastery information
- Other name: Monastery of Timios Stavros
- Order: Ecumenical Patriarchate of Constantinople
- Denomination: Greek Orthodox
- Dedication: Holy Cross
- Celebration: September 14
- Archdiocese: Church of Crete

Architecture
- Status: Monastery (17th century–1960); Katholikon
- Functional status: Inactive (as a monastery); Active (as a church)
- Style: Byzantine
- Completion date: Early 17th century

Site
- Location: Mylopotamos, Rethymno, Crete
- Country: Greece
- Coordinates: 35°23′10″N 24°50′32″E
- Public access: Yes

The Vosakou Monastery (Greek: Μονή Βωσάκου (Note: Also misspelled as Βοσάκου.)), also known as the Monastery of Timios Stavros (Μονή Τίμιος Σταυρός), is a Greek Orthodox former monastery, now church, situated in Mylopotamos, in the Rethymno region in north-central Crete, Greece. The monastery is approximately 50 kilometres (31 mi) east of the city of Rethymno and is built on the north slope of a plateau in the Tallaia mountains. Established in the 17th century and abandoned in the 1960s, works to renovate the structure commenced in 1998.

== History ==
According to various historical sources, the monastery was in continuous use from the early 17th century until 1960, when the last of its monks died. In April 1676, the Vossakos Monastery became a stauropegic, proclaimed by an act (sigillion) of Ecumenical Patriarch Parthenius IV. The monastery played an important role in the greater area of Mylopotamos and owned many pieces of land as well as establishments in the nearby villages of Sisses, Garazo and Dafnedes. It also contributed to the Greek Revolution of Independence in 1821 and the Cretan Revolution of 1866. This involvement resulted in the monastery being partially destroyed by the Turks. Later in the 19th century, the monastery was rebuilt through significant construction activities.

The current main church (katholikon) was built in 1855, replacing an earlier one dating from the 14th and 15th centuries. The church is devoted to the Holy Cross (Τίμιος Σταυρός) and celebrates on September 14 each year.

After being abandoned for over 40 years, the monastery was reinstated in 1998. An extensive restoration project was undertaken by the 28th Ephorate of Byzantine Antiquities, funded by the municipality of Kouloukonas, the Region of Crete, and the monastery itself. Today, about two thirds of the originally derelict buildings have been restored and works are still under way.

== Architecture ==
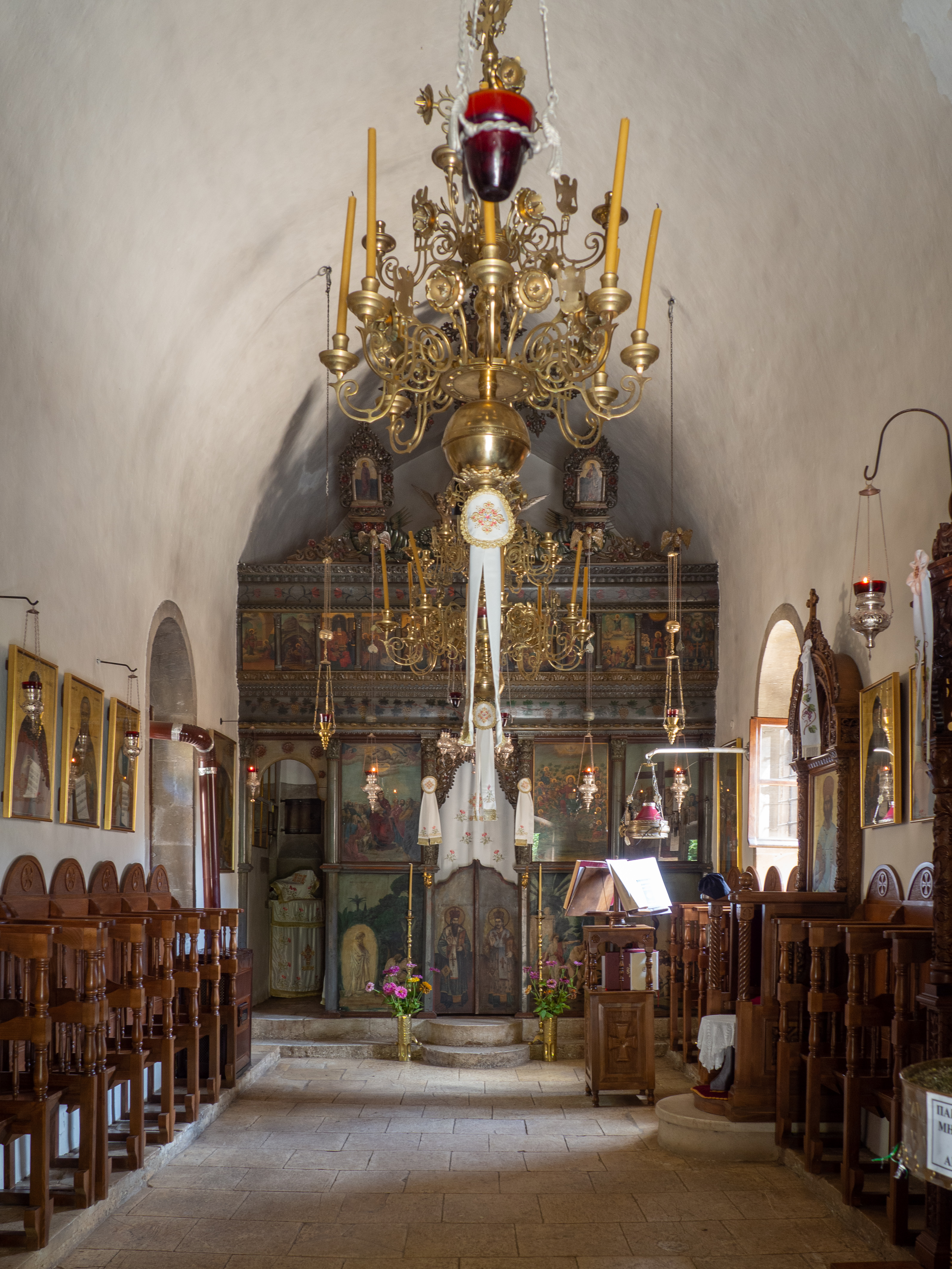
The church interior, 2021

The monastic complex is arranged in three wings around the main church (katholikon) which is situated on the east side of the central yard. It is a single-aisled, vaulted church that is characterized by simple artistic features. A fountain built in 1673 is located near the main church. The monastery's water supply system is complemented by two water-cisterns, collecting the water draining from the roofs with a system of pipes. The east wing of the monastery is determined by its monumental gate of 1669 and two small rooms. The south and west wings comprise the dining hall, kitchen, honey and wax workshops and the raki distillery.

An open-air wine-press is located in the central wing.

== See also ==
- Church of Crete
- List of Greek Orthodox monasteries in Greece
