= Thanassis Skordalos =

Thanassis Skordalos Θανάσης Σκορδαλός

Background information
- Born: 10 December 1920
- Origin: Crete, Greece
- Died: 23 April 1998 (aged 77)
- Occupations: Composer, singer
- Instrument: Cretan lyra
- Years active: 1940s – 1990s

Thanassis Skordalos (Greek: Θανάσης Σκορδαλός; 10 December 1920 – 23 April 1998) was a musician from Crete, noted for playing the lyra, the bowed string instrument of Crete and most popular surviving form of the medieval Byzantine lyra.

== Biography ==
Skordalos was born in the village Spili of Saint Basil in Rethymno, Crete.

He finished grammar school in Spili. He started playing the lyra from a very young age, around 9 years old, and by the age of 12 he was performing in traditional festivals around Crete. He soon performed in front of the Cretans in Athens – at the historical music hall "Vizantio" in Omonoia Square. His first recording was in 1946 with the famous "Spiliano Syrto" where Giannis Markogiannakis was playing the lute. In 1947, when he was 27 years old, he was positioned at the Security Services of the National Bank of Greece from where he later retired.

During his long career, Skordalos performed in most of the countries where one can find Cretan immigrants, like the United States, Australia, and Canada, in addition to many countries in Africa. He married Hrisoula Papadaki from Rethimnon and they had two sons and two daughters.

Skordalos, along with Kostas Mountakis, are considered those lyra players who offered the most to Cretan music. Skordalos' legacy lasted for sixty years and he died on 23 April 1998 in Iraklio, Crete.

== See also ==
- Lyra (Byzantine)
- Lyra (Cretan)
- Music of Crete
