= Last Words (1968 film) =

1968 film

- Directed by: Werner Herzog
- Written by: Werner Herzog
- Produced by: Werner Herzog
- Cinematography: Thomas Mauch
- Edited by: Beate Mainka-Jellinghaus
- Release date: 1968
- Running time: 13 minutes
- Country: West Germany
- Language: Greek

Last Words (German: Letzte Worte) is a 1968 short film by Werner Herzog shot in Crete and on the island of Spinalonga. The film was shot in two days during the filming of Herzog's feature Signs of Life, and edited in one day.

== Premise ==
The film tells the story of the last man to leave the abandoned island of Spinalonga, which had been used as a leper colony. The man refused to leave, and so was forcibly removed. He now lives in Crete, where he plays the Cretan lyra at nights in a bar, and refuses to speak. The film's narrative style is very unconventional, with most characters speaking their lines several times repeatedly in long takes. The man from the island has the most spoken lines of any character, as he repeatedly explains that he refuses to speak, even a single word.

== Cast (uncredited) ==
- Antonis Papadakis : the last leper
- Lefteris Daskalakis : the bouzouki player
