= Aktounta =

Village in Greece

Aktounta Ακτούντα
- Settlement
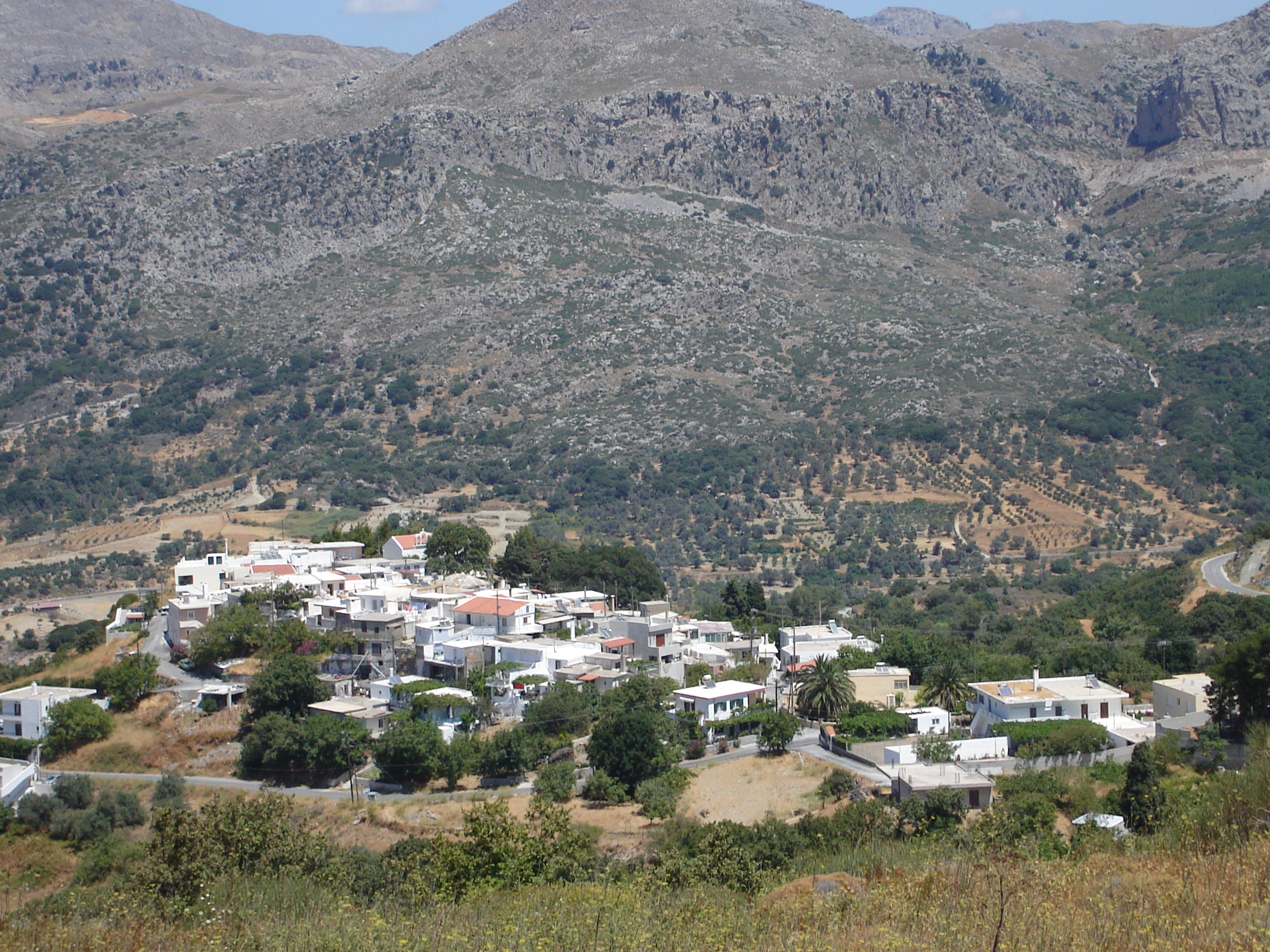

- Location within Greece
- Coordinates: 35°11′14″N 24°32′18″E
- Country: Greece
- Administrative region: Crete
- Regional unit: Rethymno
- Municipality: Agios Vasileios
- Municipal unit: Lampi
- Community: Ardaktos
- Elevation: 640 m (2,100 ft)

Population (2021)
  - Total: 57
- Time zone: UTC+2 (EET)
  - Summer (DST): UTC+3 (EEST)

Aktounta (Greek: Ακτούντα) is a village in the Rethymno regional unit in Crete, Greece. Aktounta belongs to the municipal unit of Lampi in the municipality of Agios Vasileios and it is 35 km away (south) from Rethymno. Population: 57 (2021). Altitude: 640 meters.

== History ==
Aktounta's history has been extensively studied by Emmanuel Dimitrakakis and presented in the "Aktounta and its history" book.

== Notable people from Aktounta ==
- Alekos Karavitis, Cretan music composer.

== Gallery ==
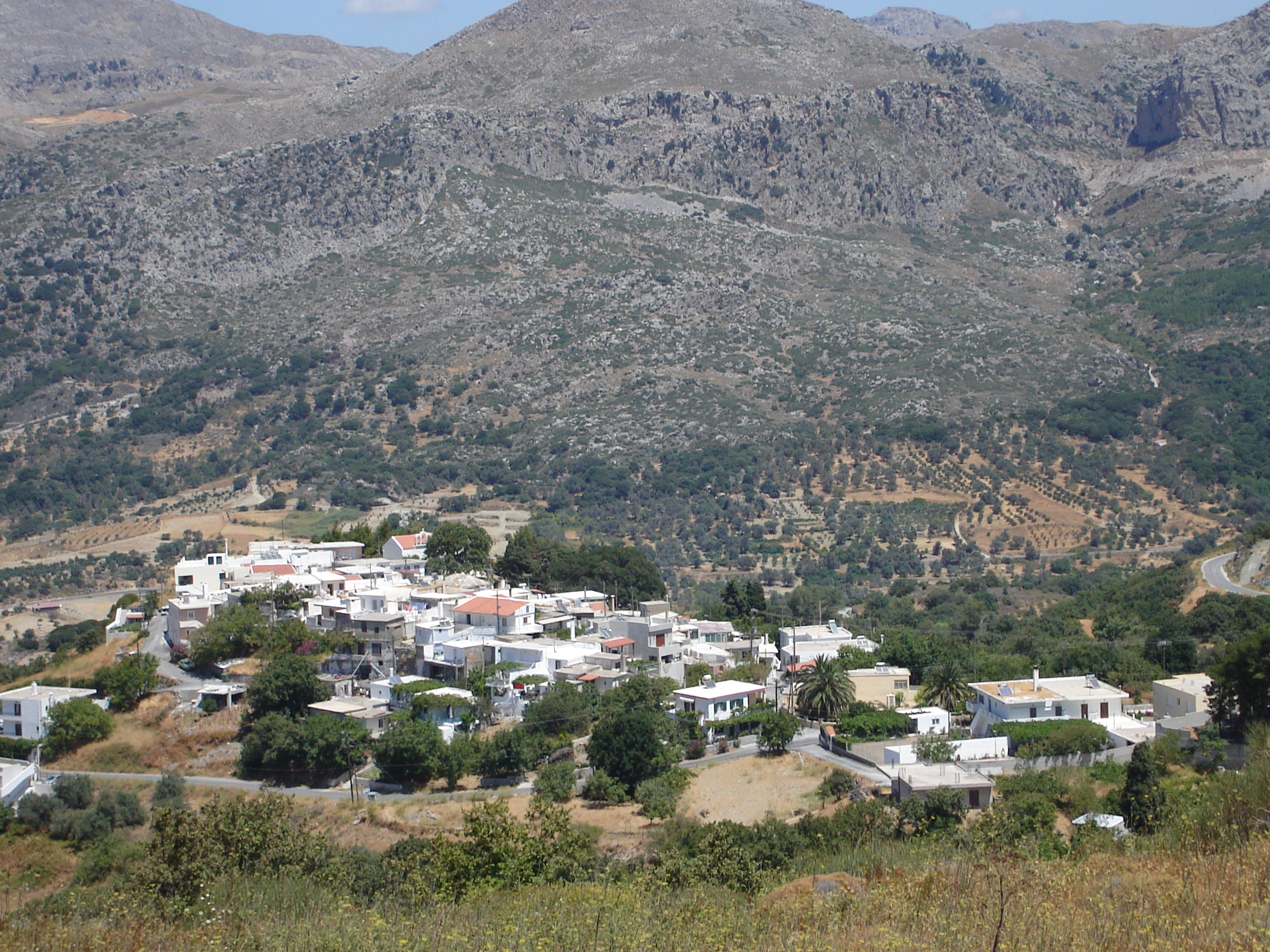
View from Komatsoulia

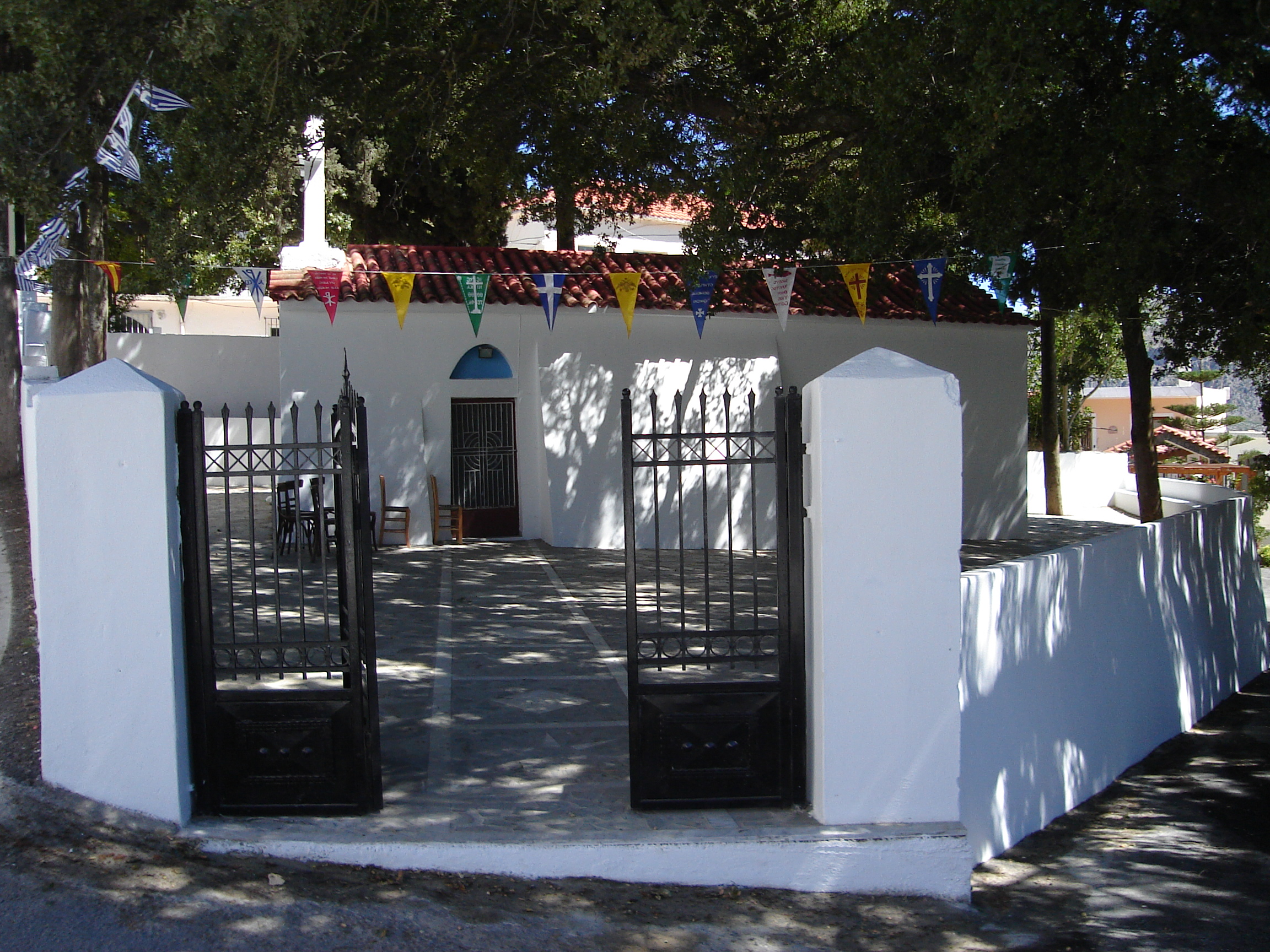
Sleepy-head (Saint Mary)

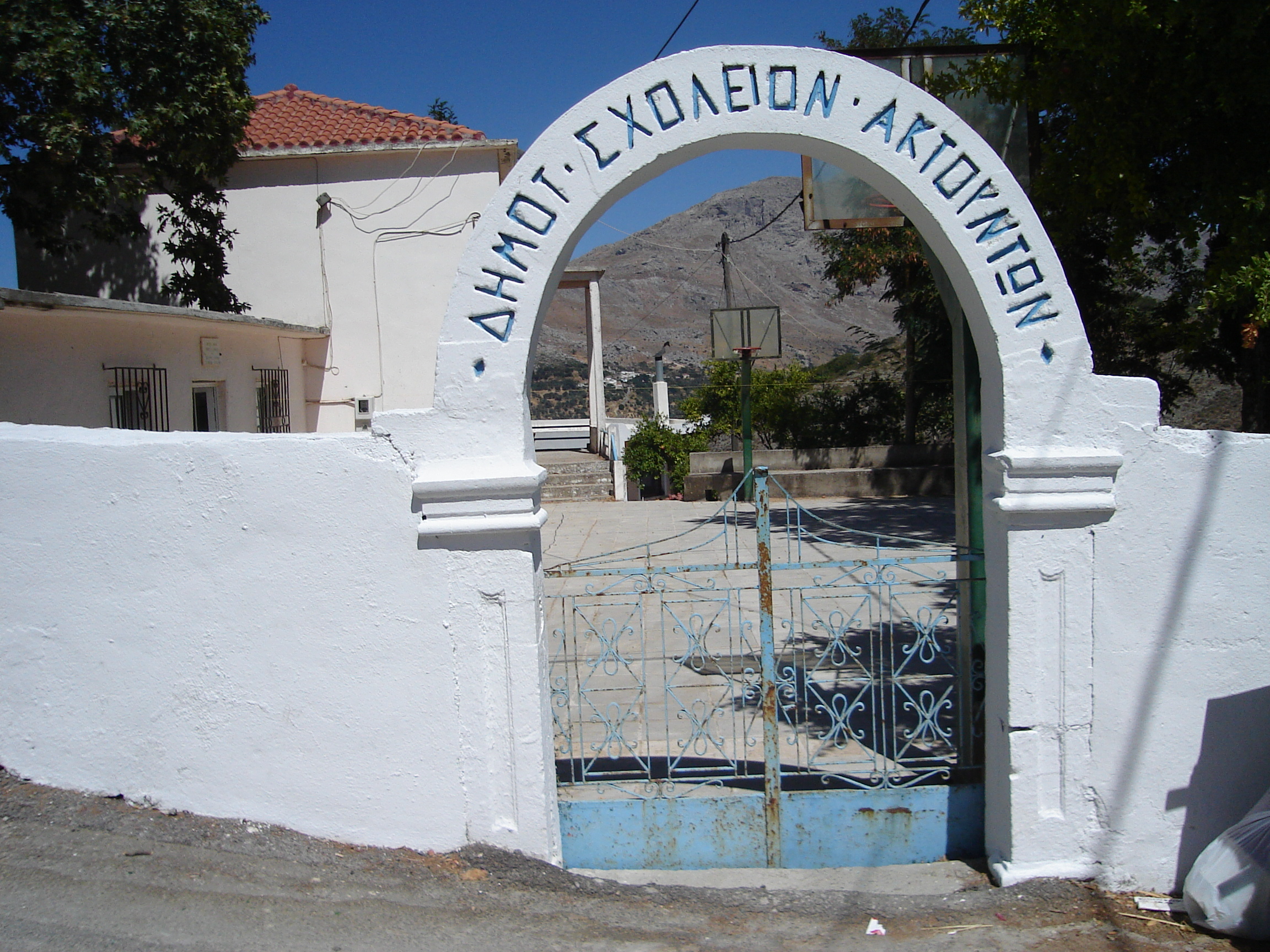
School

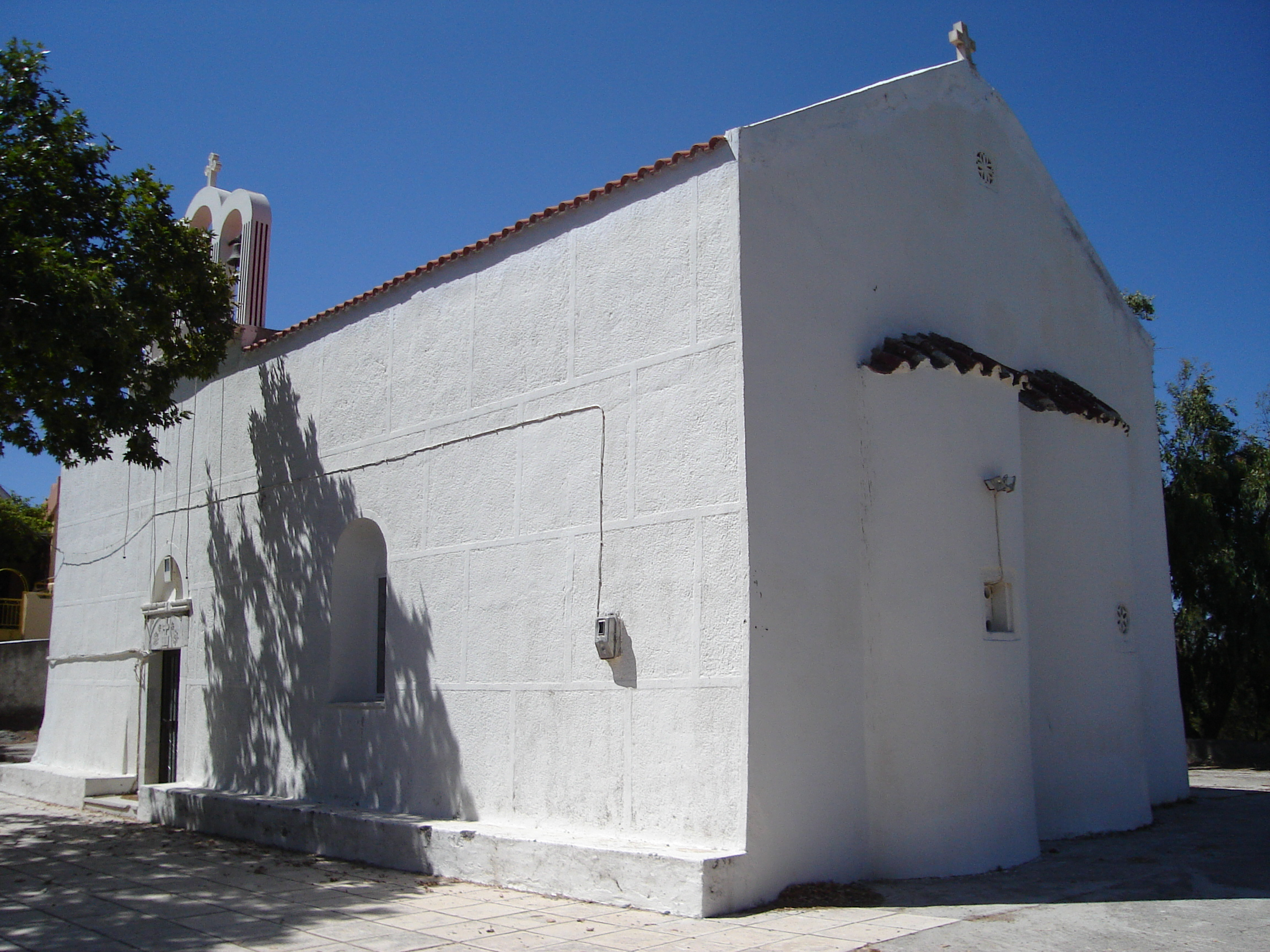
Annunciation (Saint Mary)

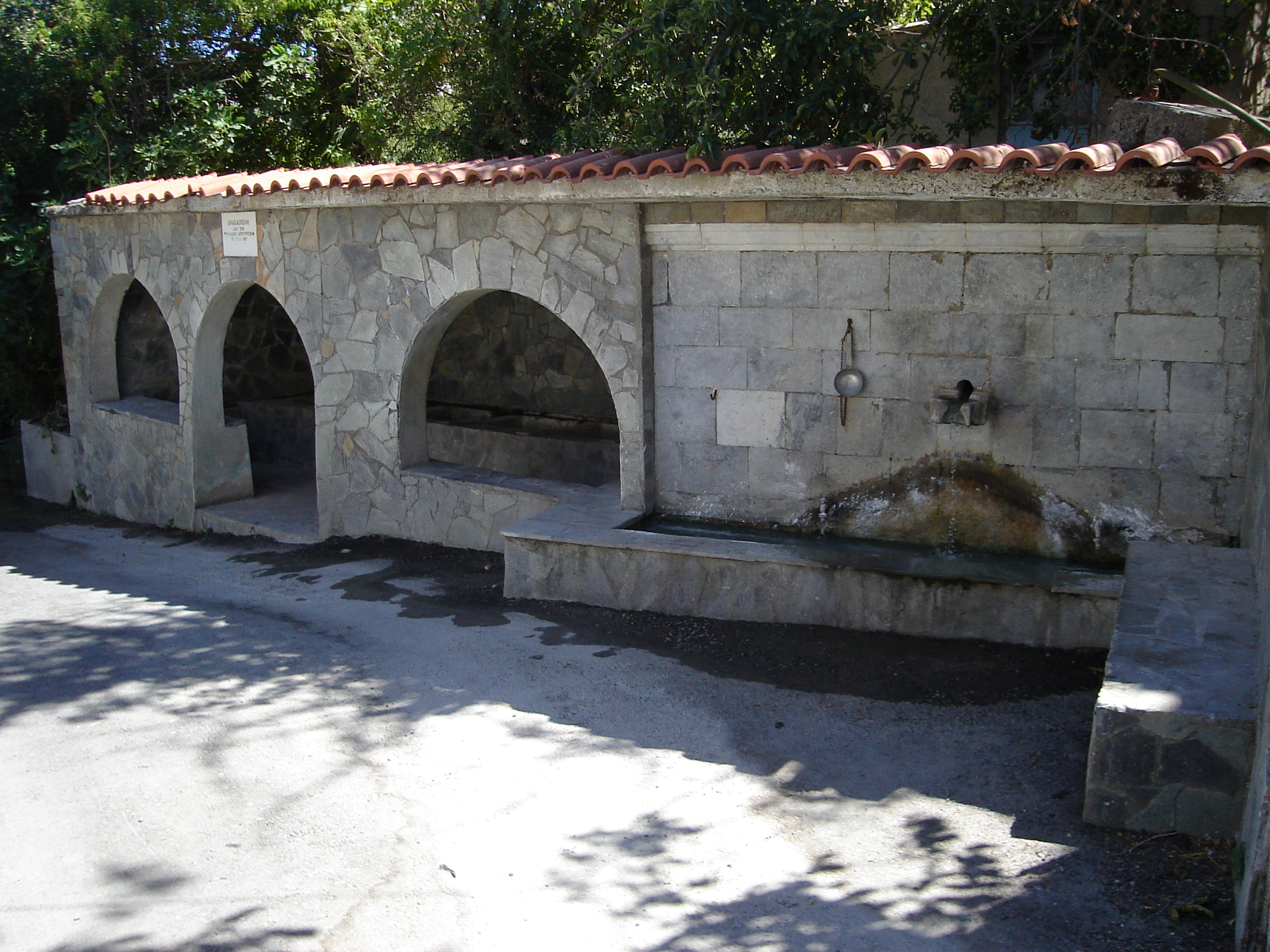
Fauset

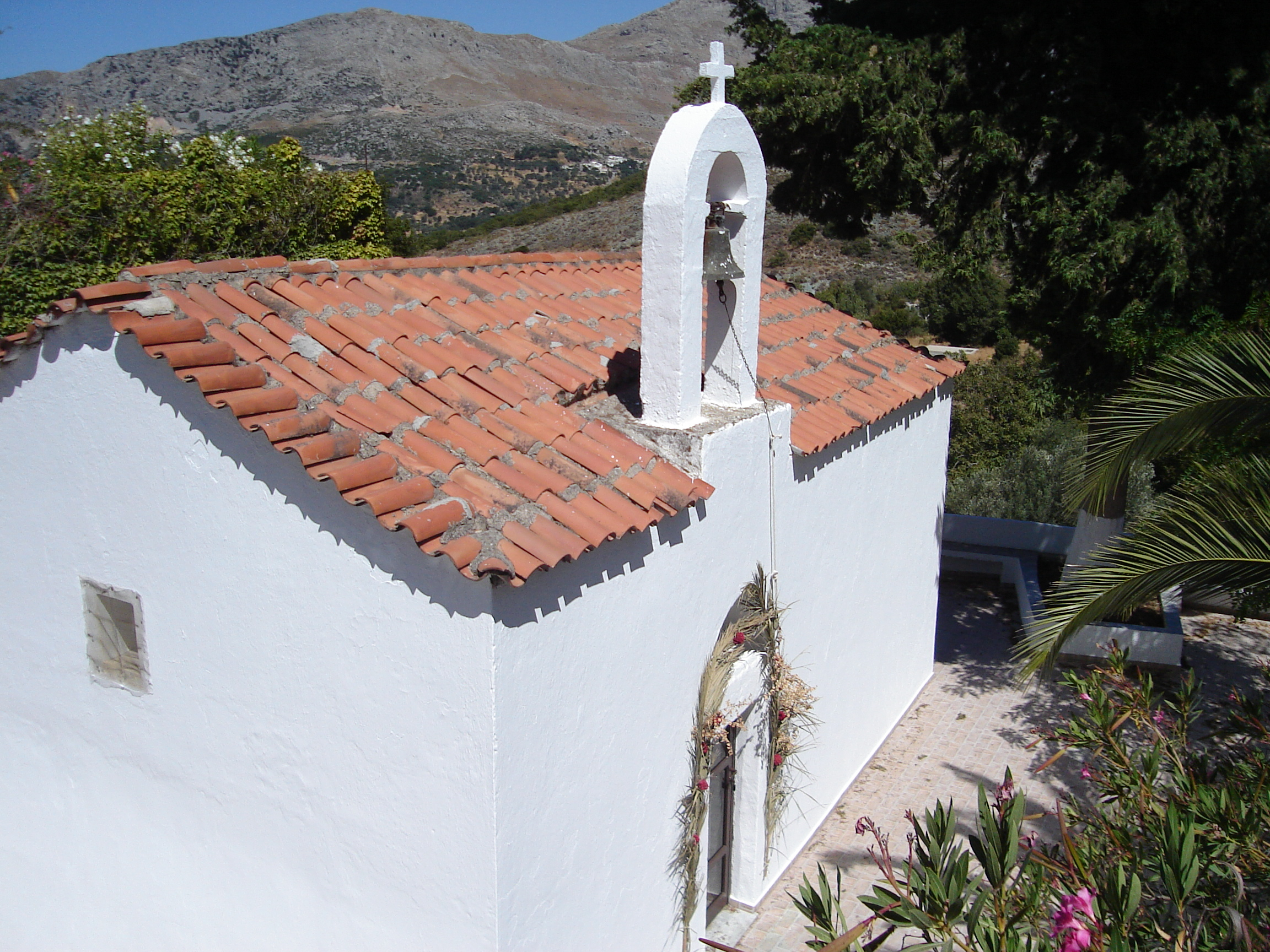
Saint Friday

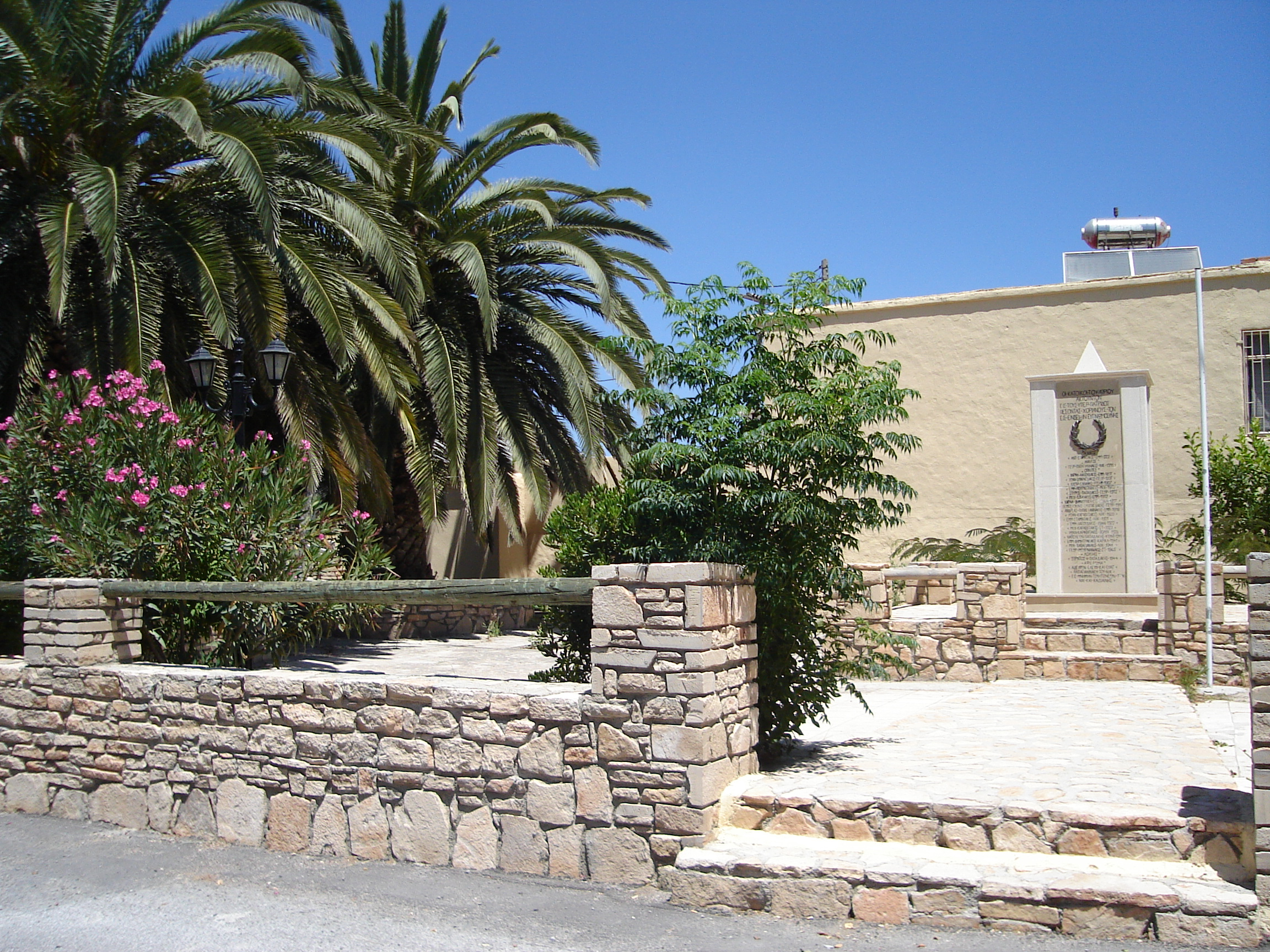
Memorial

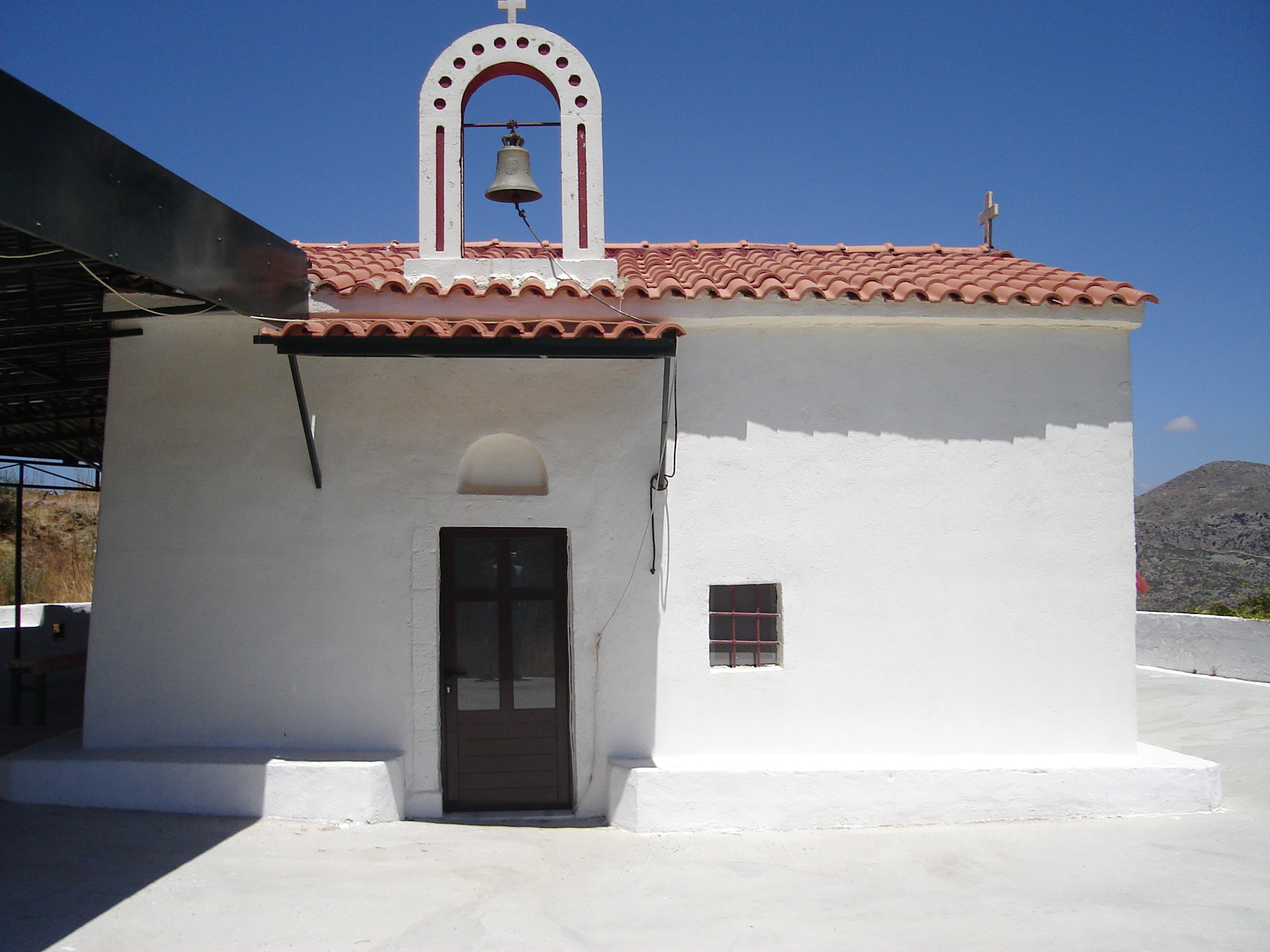
Lord (Jesus)

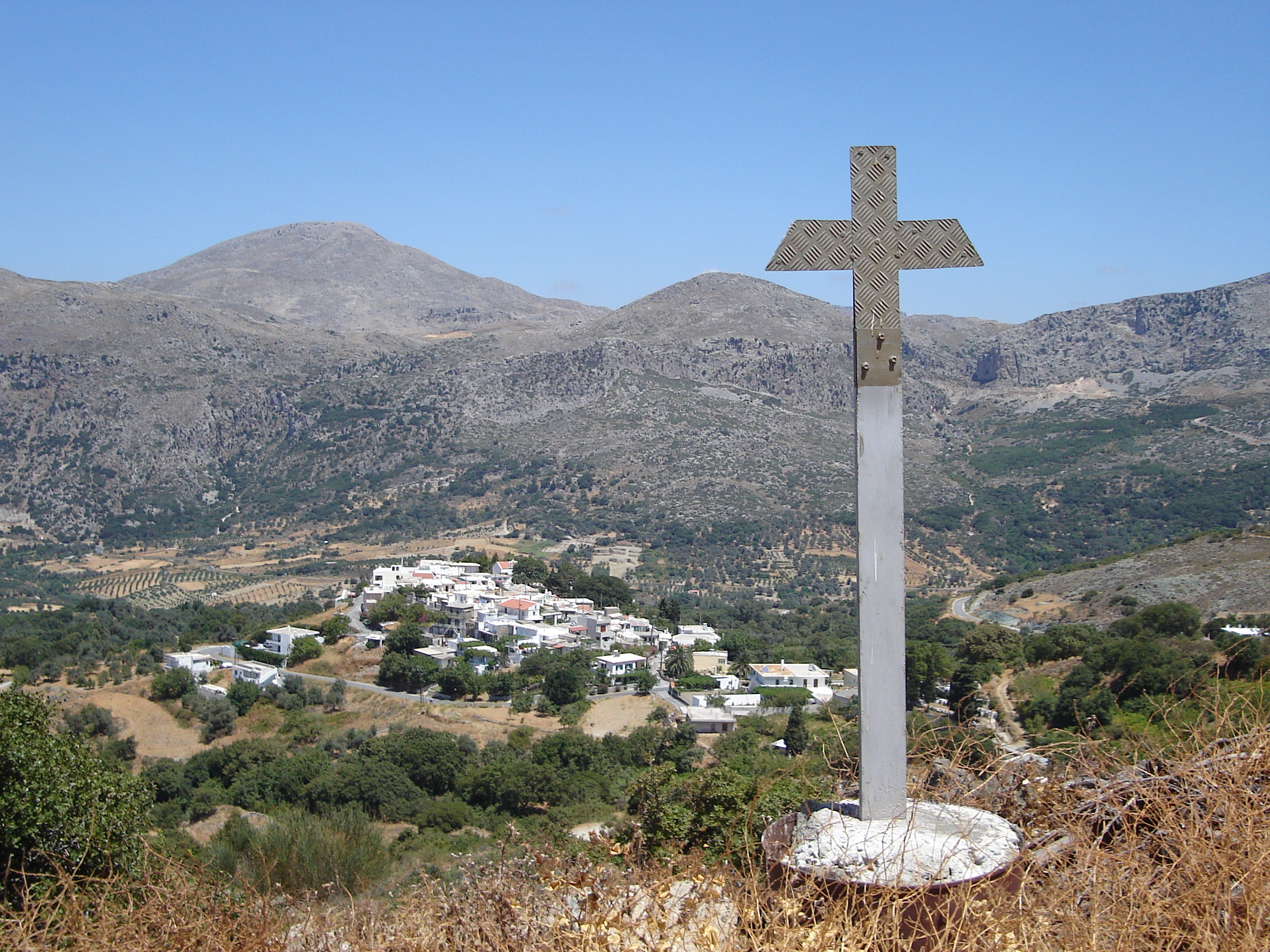
Holy Cross

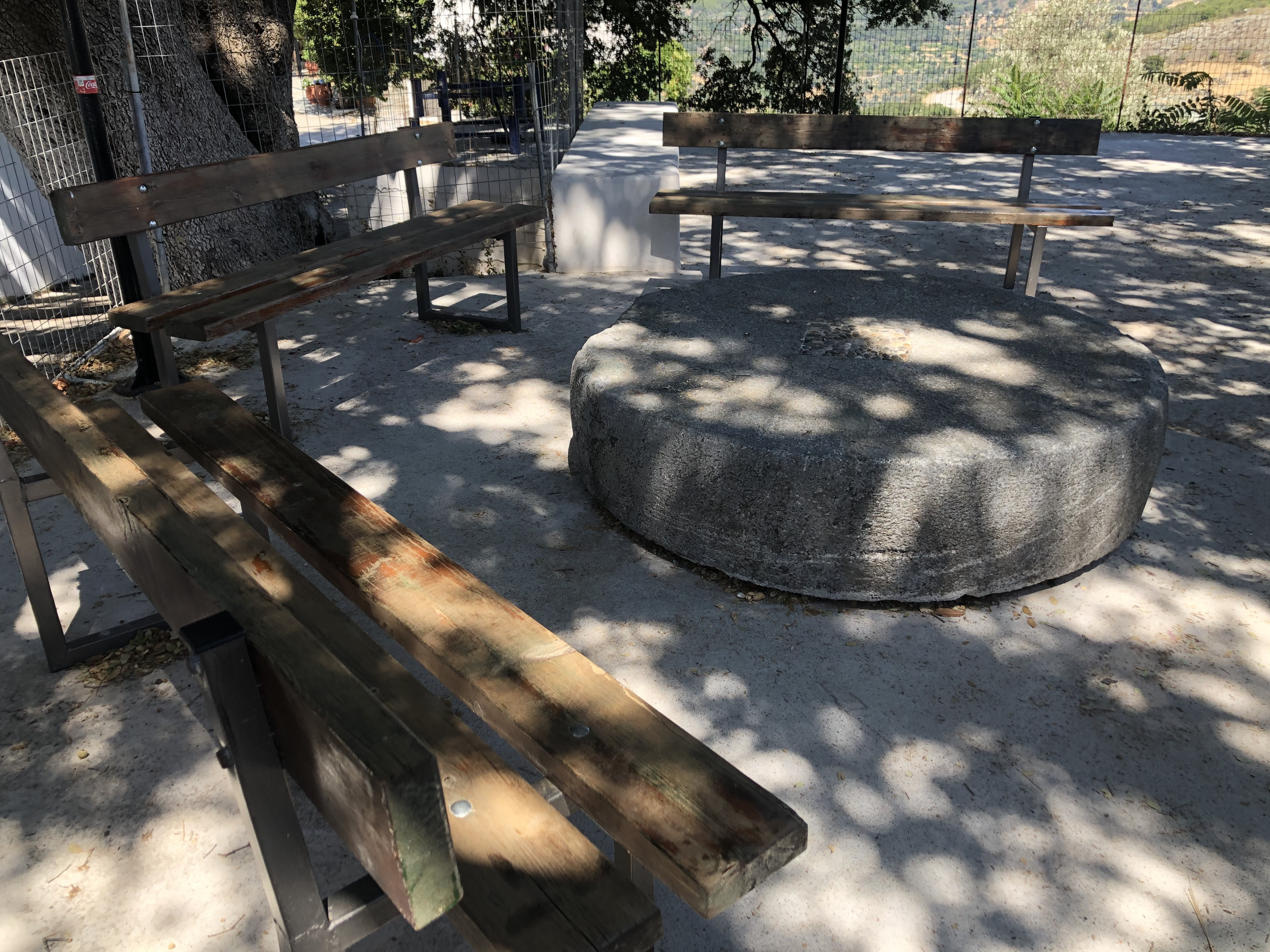
Petradi Main Square
