= Antonis Papadakis =

Greek musician

Kareklas – Καρεκλάς
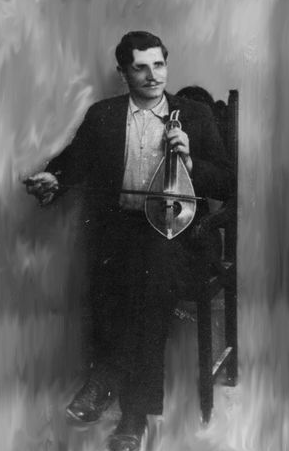
- Kareklas playing his Lyra

Background information
- Born: Antonis Papadakis; Αντώνης Παπαδάκης
- Origin: Crete, Greece
- Occupations: Composer, singer

Antonis Papadakis, or Kareklas (1893–1980) was a Cretan musician notable for his lyra performance. He was born in Pervolia, Rethymno, then part of the Ottoman Empire. He started playing the lyra as a child. He is considered one of the most important lyra performers of the early 20th century. When he started playing lyra the laouto was not yet established as an accompanying instrument of the lyre in Crete. Thus, he was occasionally using the string instrument boulgari as accompanying instrument, popular at that time in the Rethymnon. Bouzouki was a typical accompanying instrument for lyra at that time. Last Words, a short film by Werner Herzog, featured Papadakis.

Kareklas' bohemian style was characteristic of his time. He died in a Chania Home for the Aged on December 26 1977.
