= Axus (village) =

Village in Mylopotamos Municipality, Greece

Coordinates: 35°18′32″N 24°50′32″E

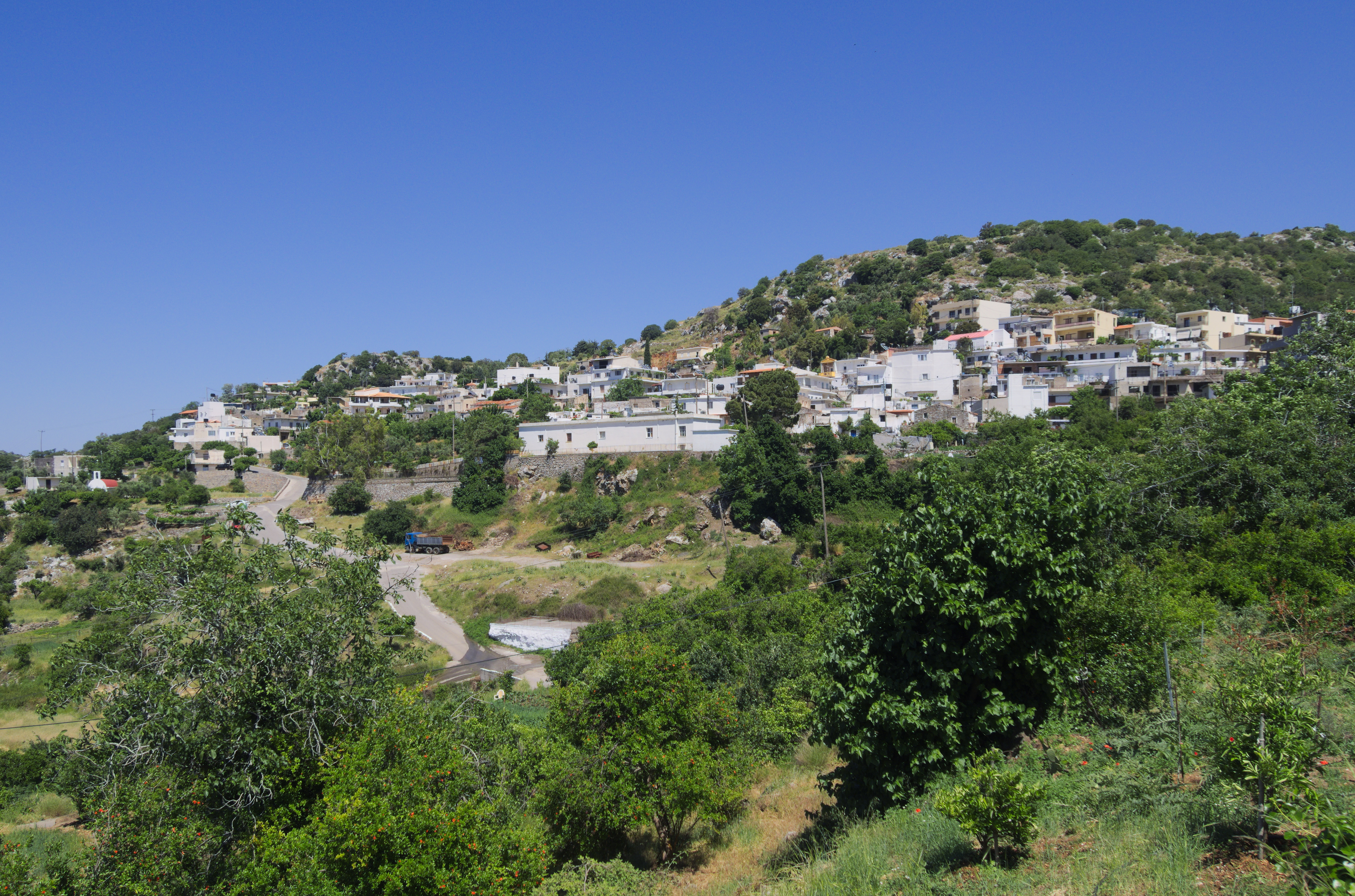

Axos (in Greek, Αξός) is a local community and a village in the municipality of Milopotamos, in Crete. In 2011, the community had a population of 424 and the village had 385 residents. It contains remains of the ancient city of Axos.
