= Kostas Mountakis =

Background information
- Also known as: Mountokostas
- Born: 10 February 1926; Mylopotamos, Crete, Greece
- Died: 31 January 1991 (aged 64)
- Occupation(s): Composer, singer

Kostas "Mountokostas" Mountakis (also Moundakis; Greek: Κώστας (Μουντόκωστας) Μουντάκης; 10 February 1926 – 31 January 1991) was a Greek musician who popularized the traditional music of the island of Crete, primarily with the Cretan lyra, the bowed string instrument of Crete and most popular surviving form of the medieval Byzantine lyra.

== Biography ==
He was born in 1926 in Mylopotamos, Crete. His parents came from the village Kallikratis in Sfakia, Crete. His older brother Nikistratos was playing the lira and so did Mitsos Kaffatos – one of the best musicians in Rethymno at that time – who was to become Kostas’ tutor.

When the German military occupation of Crete started, Kostas Mountakis was 15 years old. In those days, he played his lira and sang at the village coffee shop, and later at wedding receptions.

In 1952, Kostas Mountakis participated for the first time in an album recording when he accompanied Stelios Koutsourelis at the song "Arpaxsa kai Baildisa". In 1954, he recorded his first personal album accompanied by the Koutsourelis brothers with the all-time classics "De thelo stin kardia", "O pramateutis", "O argaleios", "Milonades kai mazoxtres", "Sto stadio pou m’efere", "Rethemniane mou kantife", "Harami sou", Erotokritos", "Kritikos Gamos", "H mahi tis Kritis", "O thanatos tou lirari". These songs are a small sample of his music.

Kostas Mountakis played an important and vital role in the popularization of the lira as well as in the formation of its teaching methods. His overall contribution to the musical tradition of Crete is very important.

== See also ==
- Music of Crete
