= Geropotamos =

Geropotamos Γεροπόταμος
- Municipal unit
- Location within the regional unit

- Location within Greece
- Coordinates: 35°22′N 24°45′E
- Country: Greece
- Administrative region: Crete
- Regional unit: Rethymno
- Municipality: Mylopotamos

Area
  - Municipal unit: 194.6 km^{2} (75.1 sq mi)

Population (2021)
  - Municipal unit: 7,516
  - Municipal unit density: 38.62/km^{2} (100.0/sq mi)
- Time zone: UTC+2 (EET)
  - Summer (DST): UTC+3 (EEST)
- Vehicle registration: ΡΕ

Geropotamos (Greek: Γεροπόταμος) is a former municipality in the Rethymno regional unit, Crete, Greece. Since the 2011 local government reform it is part of the municipality Mylopotamos, of which it is a municipal unit. The municipal unit has an area of 194.590 km^{2} (75.132 sq mi). Population 7,516 (2021). The seat of the municipality was in Perama.
