= Alekos Karavitis =

Alekos Karavitis Αλέκος Καραβίτης
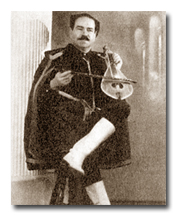
- Alekos Karavitis playing the Lyra

Background information
- Born: 1904
- Origin: Aktounta, Cretan State, Ottoman Empire
- Died: 1975 (aged 70–71)
- Occupation(s): Composer, singer

Alekos Karavitis (Greek: Αλέκος Καραβίτης, 1904–1975) was a Cretan lyra player.

Karavitis was born in Aktounta, a small village in the region of Aghios Vasileios, prefecture of Rethymnon in the Cretan State. A talented child, he very early fell in love with and started learning to play the lyra, an instrument at the heart of Cretan music, a descendant of the ancient string mini-harp of Apollo. At the age of 24, he married Chryssoula Gartzolaki from the nearby village of Yanniou and moved to Athens. They had three children, two girls and a boy.

He became a virtuoso of the lyra and developed the ambition of spreading his island's music throughout the world. He even composed his own melodies, which became widely known.

Although he was self-employed in various businesses, every year in Athens he staged the very successful "Festival of Lyra." His passion for Cretan music also spurred him to coordinate international presentations of Greek folk music and dance, bringing together famous societies of the time such as Koula Pratsika and Dora Stratou and other Hellenic institutions with his own Cretan group and others from all over Greece.

In 1936, the Cretan group and "Koula Pratsika folk music & dance society" performed at the Berlin Olympics and were awarded the prize of an elaborate cruise through North Sea fjords of Norway and Sweden aboard the renowned liner Oceania. Then, later, Karavitis and his Cretan team proceeded to Alexandria, Egypt where they were enthusiastically welcomed by the large Greek community.

In 1946, in yet another triumph for Cretan music, his group performed at the UNESCO headquarters in Paris. The zenith of his lifelong career promoting Cretan and all Greek folk music internationally was reached in the early 1950s when Karavitis organized a venture with the Dora Stratou folk music & dance society to the United States, which included a tour of several states from Maine to Florida. The climax came when his group performed at Carnegie Hall in New York.

In London, Alekos Karavitis appeared on BBC television, introduced by his close friend and war hero, Major Patrick Leigh Fermor and the internationally eminent pianist, Gina Bachauer.

Honored and widely loved, the multi-talented Karavitis helped as many people as he could. He made a large contribution to the "Kritiki Estia" (Cretan Center), and donated an apartment in central Athens to the University of Crete in Rethymnon.

He died in 1975, and certain of his works are still available in vinyl and also in CD format. Some of his many followers and talented lyra players who learned from him and his music are well known in Cretan communities. Many Cretans over the age of forty are familiar with the music of Alekos Karavitis.

== See also ==
- Lyra (Byzantine)
- Lyra (Cretan)
- Music of Crete
