= Mylopotamos, Crete =

Mylopotamos Μυλοπόταμος
- Municipality
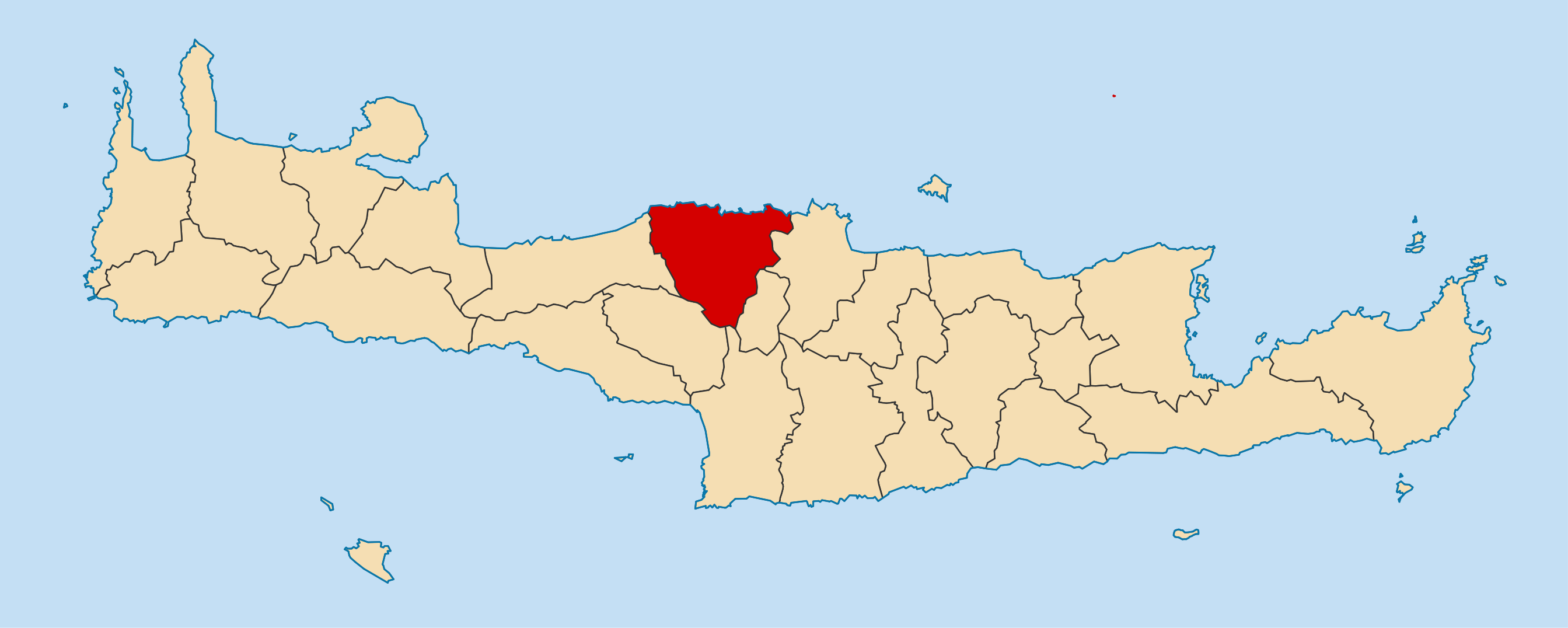

- Location within Greece
- Coordinates: 35°22′N 24°45′E
- Country: Greece
- Administrative region: Crete
- Regional unit: Rethymno
- Seat: Perama

Area
  - Municipality: 360.7 km^{2} (139.3 sq mi)

Population (2021)
  - Municipality: 14,363
  - Density: 39.82/km^{2} (103.1/sq mi)
- Time zone: UTC+2 (EET)
  - Summer (DST): UTC+3 (EEST)

Mylopotamos (Greek: Μυλοπόταμος) is a municipality in Rethymno regional unit in the Greek island of Crete. Spread across an area of 360.703 km^{2} (139.268 sq mi), it was formed from the former municipalities of Geropotamos, Kouloukonas, and Zoniana in 2011. The seat of the municipality is Perama. This region is characterized by mountainous terrain interspersed with fertile valleys.

== History ==
The broader region of Crete has a significant history dating back to the Palaeolithic era, more than 130,000 years ago. After early settlers, it came under Roman occupation in the first century BCE. It was under Byzantine rule during the early Middle Ages, before being captured by the Venetians in the 12th century. It came under the control of Ottoman Empire in the 17th century, with the locals fighting for independence. In 1866, the Battle of Arkadi resulted in widespread damage. It became part of Greece in 1913.

During the Second World War, the inhabitants actively participated in the Battle of Crete. After the capture of Crete by Nazi Germany in 1941, the local people from Mylopotamos fought against the invaders, which resulted in mass executions by German occupation forces. It was occupied by Germany till 1945, after which it re-joined Greece. The province of Mylopotamos was one of the provinces of Rethymno Prefecture. Its territory corresponded with that of the current municipalities Mylopotamos and Anogeia. It was abolished in 2006, and Mylopotamos was officially formed from the former municipalities of Geropotamos, Kouloukonas, and Zoniana in 2011.

== Geography ==
Mylopotamos municipality is located in the Rethymno regional unit in the Greek island of Crete. The name is derived from the water mills that existed in the Avlopotamos river. The municipal unit occupies an area of 360.703 km^{2} (139.268 sq mi). The topography of the region consists of the Kouloukonas and Talea mountains, interspersed with plains, where people engage in livestock farming.

== Demographics ==
Mylopotamos municipality had a total population of 14,363 inhabitants according to the 2021 census data. The population is distributed across numerous villages and settlements. The municipal unit of Perama had a population of 6,108 while Kouloukonas recorded 4,772 inhabitants.

== See also ==
- Axus (village)
- Vosakou Monastery
