= Ross Daly =

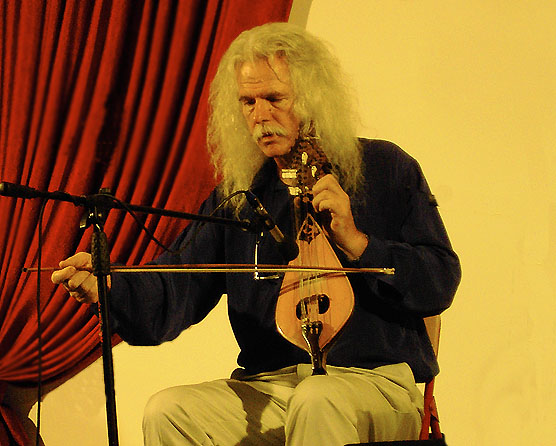
- Ross Daly in Archanes, Crete in 2007

Background information
- Born: 29 September 1952 (age 74); King's Lynn, Norfolk, England
- Genre: World music
- Label: Independent
- Website: rossdaly.gr
- Studio albums: The Other Side 2014, Tin Anixi Perimenes 2015, Osi Hara’Houn ta Poulia 2016, Lunar 2017

Ross Daly (born 29 September 1952) is a world musician who specializes in the Cretan lyra. Although of Irish descent, he has been living on the island of Crete for over 35 years.

== Biography ==
Music is the language of my dialogue with that which I perceive to be sacred.

— Ross Daly, Ross Daly biography

Ross Daly has traveled the world, mainly in the Middle East, Central Asia, and the Indian subcontinent, studying various forms of local music traditions.

In 1982, he established an educational institution called Labyrinth Musical Workshop, in the village of Houdetsi, Crete, twenty kilometers south of the capital city of Herakleion. More than 250 instruments that Daly collected during his travels are displayed.

Since 2002, the Labyrinth Musical Workshop hosts seminars and "master classes" with teachers of traditional music from around the world, attracting students from around the world. Labyrinth Musical Workshop was founded to initiate, mainly young people, a creative approach to traditional musical idioms from various parts of the world.

In 1990, Daly designed a new type of Cretan lyra that incorporates elements of raki, the byzantine lyra, and the Indian sarangi. The result was a lyra with three playing strings of 29 cm in length (the same as the standard Cretan lyra), and 18 sympathetic strings which resonate on Indian-styled jawari bridges (the number of sympathetic strings was later increased to 22).

Daly has released more than 35 albums of his compositions and of his own arrangements of traditional melodies collected during his travels.

In the Summer of 2004, he was the artistic director of the cultural program of the Olympic Games for the Olympic city of Heraklion on the island of Crete, titled "Crete, Music Crossroads". He organized and artistically supervised 15 concerts with the participation of 300 musicians from all over the world, including Jordi Savall, Eduardo Niebla, Huun Huur Tu, Habil Aliyev, Dhoad Gypsies of Rajasthan, Mohammad Rahim Khushnawaz, Chemirani Trio, Adel Selameh.

Ross Daly is the originator of the term Contemporary Modal Music, which refers to contemporary compositional works which draw their influences and inspiration from the broader world of Modal musical traditions which are found primarily (although not exclusively) in the vast geographical region between Western Africa and Western China. Composers of Contemporary Modal Music initially study intensively various of these traditions and subsequently compose new works in which they freely integrate influences and elements from these idioms into their work. The Musical Workshop Labyrinth, of which Ross Daly is the founder and artistic director, has been very active in promoting and supporting this type of composition as it crosses ethnic and other lines as well as stressing contemporary creative work in musical idioms which are usually considered to be "traditional" and therefore with their "creative center" in the past. Ross Daly himself disputes this notion, believing instead that the epithet "traditional" implies above all an element of timelessness in which the contributions of the past, present, and future are equally important and relevant to the creative process.

In the European Elections of 2009, he was the candidate with the Ecologists Greens.

== Discography ==
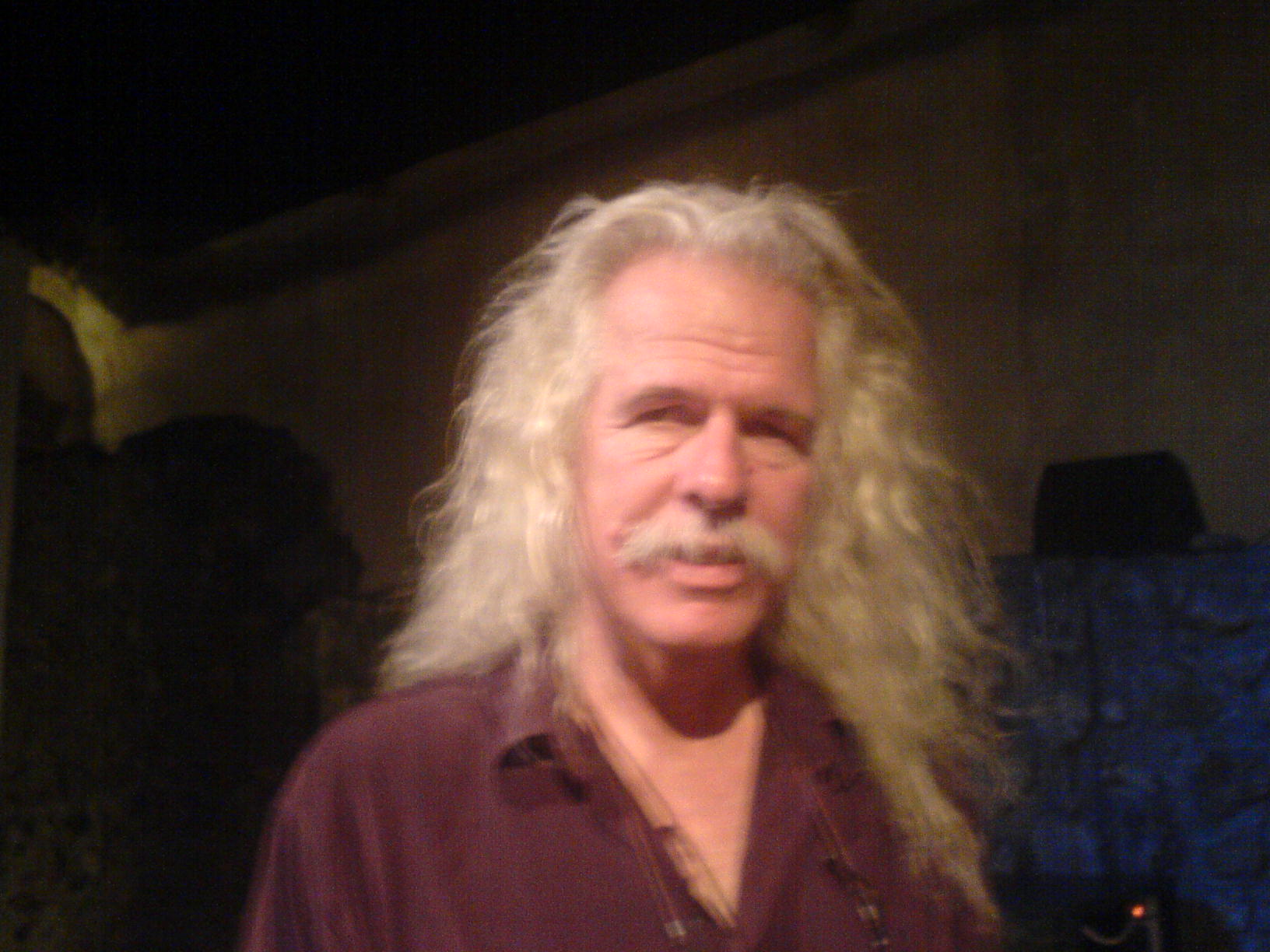
Photo of the musician Ross Daly

- Oneirou Topi (1982)
- Lavyrinthos (1984)
- Ross Daly (1986)
- Anadysi (1987)
- Elefthero Simio (1989)
- 7 songs and 1 Semai (with Spyridoula Toutoudaki) (1989)
- Kriti 1 (with Manolis Manassakis) (1989)
- Pnoe (with Vassilis Soukas) (1990)
- Hori (1990)
- the Circle at the Crossroads (1990)
- Kriti 2 (with Babis Chairetis aka "Vourgias")
- Selected Works (1991)
- An Ki (with Djamchid Chemirani) (1991)
- Mıtos (1992)
- Cross Current (with Djamchid Chemirani & Irshad Khan) (1994)
- Naghma (with Paul Grant, Bijan Chemirani & Nayan Ghosh) (1998)
- At The Cafe Aman (1998)
- Synavgia (1998)
- Beyond The Horizon (2001)
- Gulistan (with Bijan Chemirani) (2001)
- Kin Kin (2002)
- Music Of Crete (2002)
- Iris (2003)
- Mıcrokosmos (2003)
- Echo Of Time (2004)
- Spyrıdoula Toutoudaki – Ross Daly / Me Ti Fevga Tou Kerou (2004)
- Live At Theatre De La Vılle / Avec Le Trio Chemıranı (2005)
- White Dragon (2008)
- The Other Side (2014)
- Tin Anixi Perimenes (with Vassilis Stavrakakis, Giorgos Manolakis) (2015)
- Osi Hara’Houn ta Poulia (with Evgenia Damavoliti-Toli) (2016)
- Lunar (with Kelly Thoma) (2017)

== Concerts at festivals ==
Daly has performed in many venues and festivals:

- Musicaves, Givry (71), France (2013)
- Kala Kathoumena, Nicosia (Old City), Cyprus (2012)
- Bourges, France (2008)
- Al Dhafra Concert Hall, Abu Dhabi (2008)
- Rainforest World Music Festival, Sarawak, Malaysia (2008)
- Théâtre de la Ville, Paris, France (1992–93, 2002, 2003, 2005, 2008)
- Nikos Kazantzakis Theater, Herakleion, Crete (1996, 1999, 2001, 2008)
- Jerusalem Oud Festival (2008)
- San Sebastien Festival, Spain (2008)
- Purcell Room, London (2007), Clarinet Festival, Bretagne (2008)
- Pieśń naszych korzeni, Song of our Roots, Jarosław, Poland (2008)
- Emirates Palace Theater (2006, 2007)
- Nuremberg, Germany (1992, 2006)
- Migration Festival, Taipei, Taiwan (2006)
- International Lute Festival, Tetouan, Morocco (2006)
- Madrid Summer Festival, Sabatini Gardens, Spain (2006)
- International Festival, Warsaw, Poland (2006)
- Manresa Festival, Barcelona, Spain (2006)
- Municipal concert hall, Kayseri, Turkey (2006)
- Athens Concert Hall, (1993, 2006)
- Cairo Opera House (2006)
- Cemal Reşit Rey Concert Hall, Istanbul, Τurkey (1997, 2005, 2006)
- National Concert Hall, Dublin, Ireland(2005)
- Konzerthaus Mozart Saal, Vienna, Austria (2005)
- San Francisco World Music Festival, U.S.A (2005)
- State Theatre Company, Adelaide, Australia (2005)
- Skala Aglantza Nicosia, Cyprus (2005)
- Oslo Cathedral (2004)
- Södra Teatern, Stockholm, Sweden (2004)
- World Music Festival, Skopje, Macedonia (1999, 2003)
- Urkult Festival, Nämforsen, Sweden (2003)
- Festival de Saint Chartier, France (2003)
- Copanhagen, Denmark (1995–97, 2003)
- Thessaloniki Concert Hall (2002)
- Rudolstadt Festival, Germany (2002)
- Queen Elizabeth Hall, London, U.K (1998, 2000, 2002)
- Protestant Church, Brussels, Belgium (2001)
- Isle of Wight Festival (2000)
- Archaeological Museum, Madrid, Spain (1998–99, 2001)
- Festival of Murcia, Spain (1999)
- WDR, Munich, Germany (1999)
- Lycabbetus theatre, Athens (1987,91,93,98)
- Odeon of Herodes Atticus, Greece (1992, 1998, 2022)
- Aarhus, Denmark (1997)
- Huset theatre, Ahlborg, Denmark (1995–97)
- Passionskirche, Berlin (1994,95,96)
- Les Nuits Atypiques Festival, Langon, France (1995)
- Luxemburg Concert Hall (1992, 1994)
- WDR Wuppertal, Germany (1992)
- Frankfurt, Germany (1992)
- Epidaurus Theatre, Greece
