= Cretan lyra =

Musical instrument

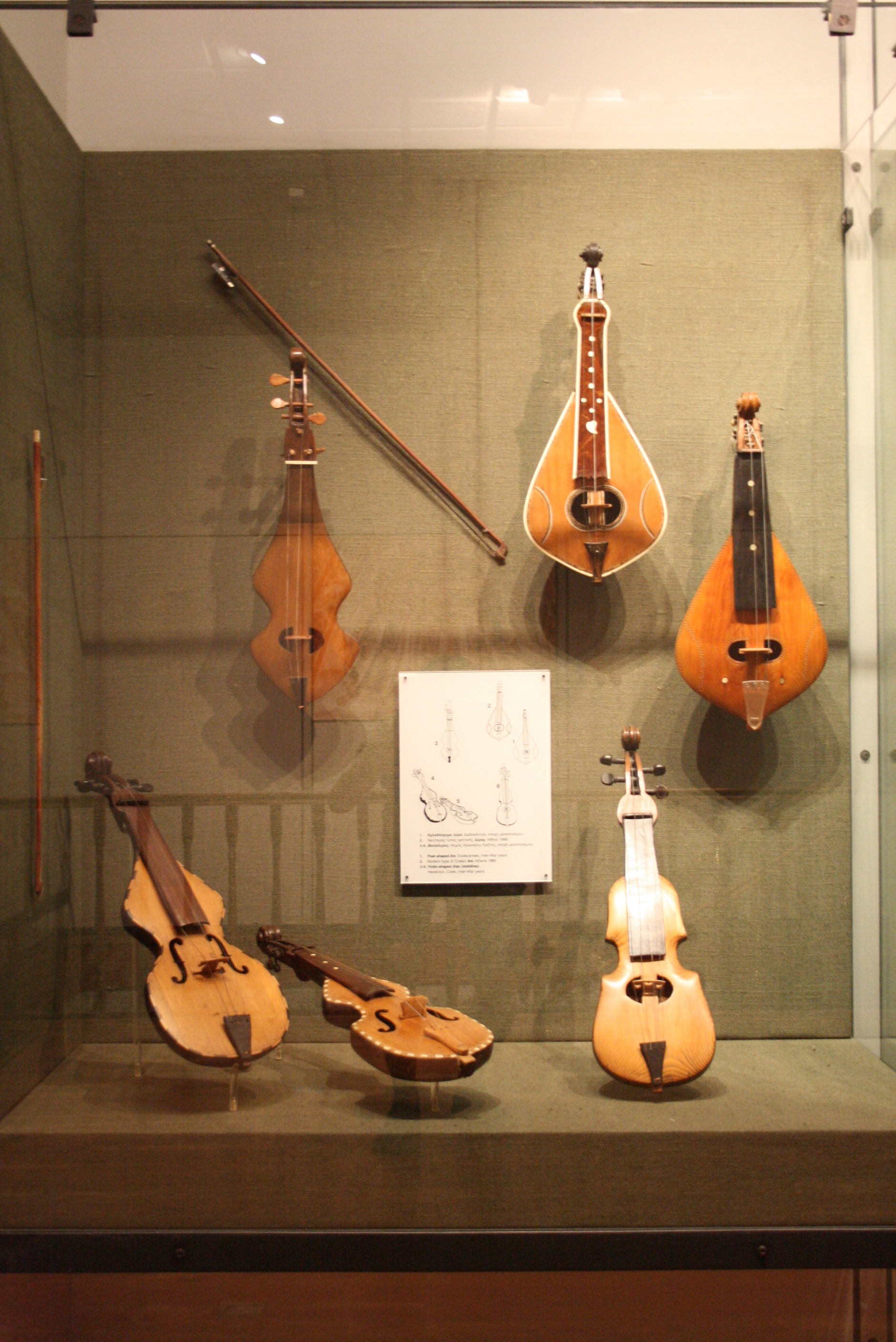
- Various models of the Cretan lyra at the museum of Greek traditional instruments, Athens.

String instrument
- Other names: Cretan lyra/lira, Aegean lyra
- Hornbostel–Sachs classification: 321.321-71 (Necked bowl lute sounded by a bow)
- Developed: 10th century AD (est)

Related instruments
- Byzantine lyra, the ancestor of the Cretan lyra; Calabrian lira (Italian: Lira Calabrese); Classical kemençe, (Turkish: Armudî kemençe, Greek: Politiki lyra); Gadulka (Bulgarian: Гъдулка); Lira da braccio; Rabāb (Arabic الرباب); Lijerica; Violin

Musicians
- Andreas Rodinos; Alekos Karavitis; Antonis Papadakis (Kareklas); Kostas Mountakis; Nikos Xilouris; Psarantonis; Ross Daly; Yiorgos Kaloudis; Thanassis Skordalos; Georgia Dagaki

The Cretan lyra (Greek: Κρητική λύρα) is a pear-shaped three-stringed Greek lyra, a traditional musical instrument, central to the traditional music of Crete and other islands in the Dodecanese and the Aegean Archipelago, in Greece. The Cretan lyra is considered to be the most popular surviving form of the medieval Byzantine lyra, an ancestor of most European bowed instruments.

== Playing style ==
The lyra is held vertically on the player's lap, in the same way as a small viol, rather than being placed under the chin of the player like a violin. For normal right-handed playing, the player's right hand holds the bow. The strings are stopped by pressing the fingernails of the player's left hand against the side of the string, rather than by pressing the string against the fingerboard. This gives it a different tone from the violin. Older lyras (lyrakis) have one string which is normally not fingered and is used as a drone, playing the same note while tunes are played on the other two strings

== Origins ==
The Cretan lyra is closely related to the bowed Byzantine lyra, the ancestor of many European bowed instruments. The 9th-century Persian geographer Ibn Khurradadhbih (d. 911), in his lexicographical discussion of instruments, cited the lyra as a typical instrument of the Byzantines along with the urghun (organ), shilyani (probably a type of harp or lyre) and the salandj (probably a bagpipe) (Margaret J. Kartomi, 1990).

The Byzantine lyra spread westward through Europe with uncertain evolution; a notable example is the Italian lira da braccio, a 15th-century bowed instrument and possibly the predecessor of the modern violin. Bowed instruments similar to the Cretan lyra and direct descendants of the Byzantine lyra have continued to be played in many post-Byzantine regions until the present day, with small changes, for example, the Gadulka in Bulgaria, the bowed Calabrian lira in Italy and the Classical Kemenche (Turkish: Armudî kemençe, Greek: Πολίτικη λύρα) in Istanbul, Turkey.

There are three schools of thought when it comes to how the bowed instrument was introduced to the island

1. The Byzantine lyra was introduced after 961 AD, when the island was reconquered from Arabs by the Byzantine Empire under the command of Nikephoros Phokas. At that time, noble families from Constantinople were sent to settle on Crete to inject new life and replenish the Greek population, and they introduced many Byzantine traditions from Constantinople.
2. The lyra was introduced from the islands of the Dodecanese, and entered the island through the eastern town of Sitia (where it was most popular), which is the neighbor of Kassos and Karpathos; this must have happened by the 12th century.
3. The lyra was gradually introduced into the island's traditions as a popular element of the Byzantine music and tradition, in the same way it was introduced in other regions (e.g. the Lira da braccio and Calabrian lira in Italy and the Gadulka in Bulgaria).

Over the centuries, and especially during the island's Venetian era, the violin exerted its influence on the music of Crete, both under the organological and musical aspect, bringing about profound changes in the instrument's repertory, tuning, organology, musical language and performance practice.

== Types ==
There are three major types of Cretan lyras:

1. the lyraki (Greek: λυράκι), a small model of lyra, almost identical to the Byzantine lyra, used only for the performance of dances (Anoyanakis, 1976)
2. the vrontolyra (Greek: βροντόλυρα), which has a very strong sound, ideal for accompaniment of songs
3. the common lyra (Greek: λύρα κοινή), popular in the island today; designed based on the combination of lyraki with the violin.

The influence of the violin caused the transformation of many features of the old form of Cretan Lyra (lyraki) into the contemporary lyra, including its tuning, performance practice, and repertory. In 1920, the viololyra was developed in an effort by local instrument manufacturers to give the sound and the technical possibilities of the violin to the old Byzantine lyraki. Twenty years later, a new combination of lyraki and violin gave birth to the common lyra. Other types include the four-stringed lyra.

In 1990, Ross Daly designed a new type of Cretan lyra which incorporates elements of lyraki, the Byzantine lyra and the Indian sarangi. The result was a lyra with three playing strings of 29 cm in length (the same as the standard Cretan lyra), and 18 sympathetic strings which resonate on Indian-styled jawari bridges (the number of sympathetic strings was later increased to 22).

== Construction ==
The Lyra has a body (kafka, or kafki) with a pear-shaped of oval soundboard (kapaki), with two small semi-circular soundholes. The body and neck are carved out of one piece of aged wood (minimum 10 years old). Traditionally, the body's wood was sourced from trees growing in Crete such as walnut, mulberry and asfadamos, the local plane tree; today it is mostly imported.

The soundboard is carved with a shallower arch and is usually made of straight-grained softwood: traditionally the aged wooden beams of buildings (katrani) and, ideally, 300-year-old wooden beams from Venetian ruins. In the past, the strings were made of animal gut and the bow (doxari) of horse-tail hair. In the past, the bow's arc usually had a series of spherical bells, gerakokoudouna (hawk bells), to provide rhythmic accompaniment to the melody when the bow was moving. Today, most lyras are played with violin bows.

A method for the vibration analysis and characterization of the Cretan lyre top plates was reported in 2006.

== Tuning ==
The old model of the Cretan lyra (also called lyraki ~ small lyra), is tuned 5-1-4. That is, the middle string is the lowest in pitch and the others are a 4th and a 5th above it. The performer plays the melody on the 1st and 3rd string, using the 2nd string as a drone (Magrini 1997), similarly to the Byzantine lyras from ca. 1190 AD, found in the excavations of Novgorod (Anthony Baines, 1992).

The contemporary lyra, modeled after Stagakis' design, is tuned in fifths (to G-d-a'), similar to the lowest three strings of a violin, albeit without a droning string. All strings may be fingered and used as melody strings. Some Lyras have a fourth string at the top tuned, to "e" (E5), as a violin E-string, to allow for a larger octave range.

Common lyra

Lyraki

== In use ==
The Cretan lyra is still widely used in Crete (see Music of Crete), in some islands of the Dodecanese and the Aegean archipelago as well as in parts of northern Greece.

== Artists ==
Noted Cretan Lyra performers include Andreas Rodinos, Thanassis Skordalos, Kostas Mountakis, Kareklas, Nikos Xilouris, Leonidas Klados, Ross Daly, Michalis Kallergis, Nikos Gonianakis, Kelly Thoma, Zacharias Spyridakis, Paris Perysinakis, Dimitris Vakakis, Stelios Petrakis, Vassilis Skoulas, Yiorgos Kaloudis and Psarantonis. Today in Rhodes, Yiannis Kladakis is known for reviving this type of lyra in the island. Georgia Dagaki is known for playing the instrument at the current shows of rock singer Eric Burdon. Yiorgos Kaloudis has interpreted Johan Sebastian Bach's suites for violoncello on the Cretan Lyra.

== Gallery ==
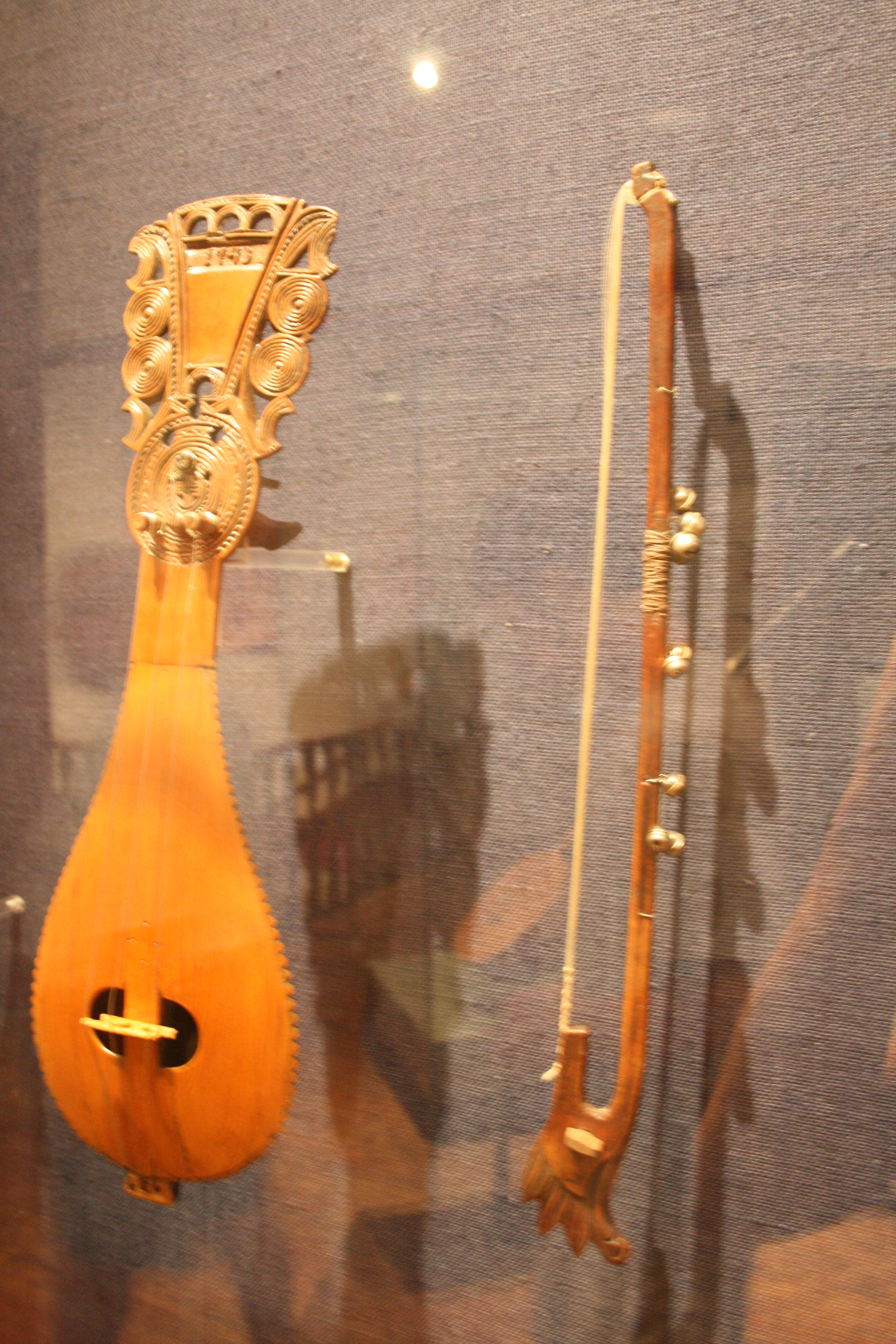
Cretan Lyra - old type (lyraki).

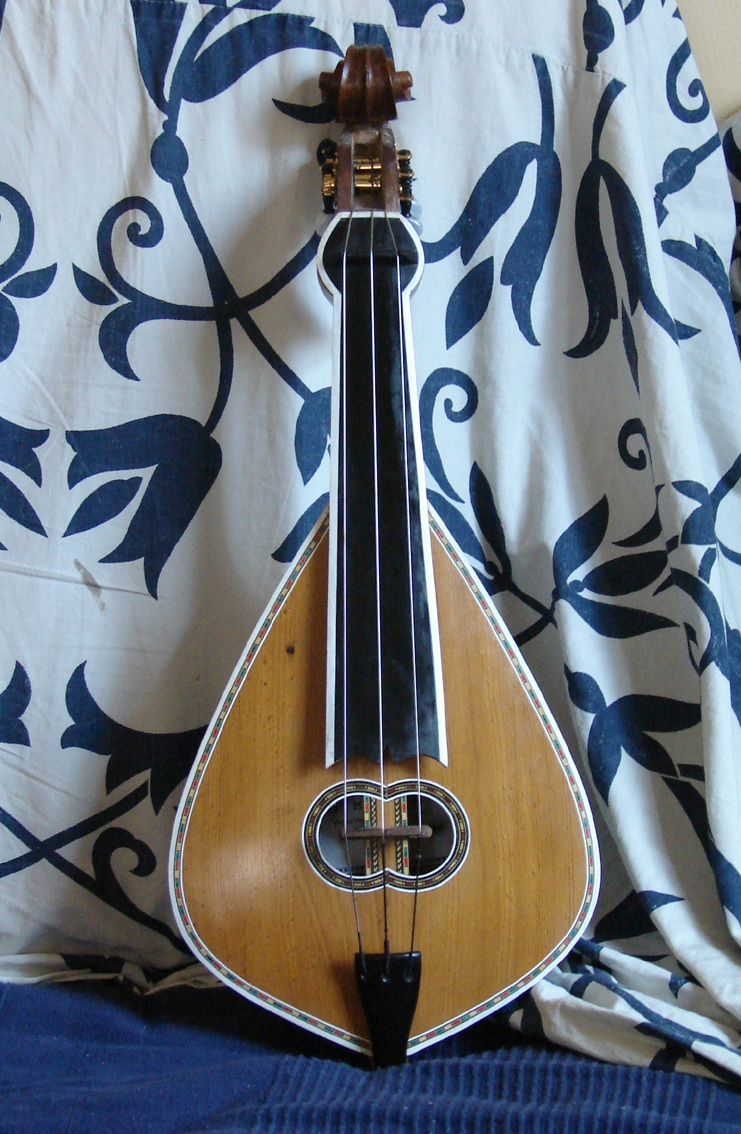
Cretan lyra - common type after 1940.

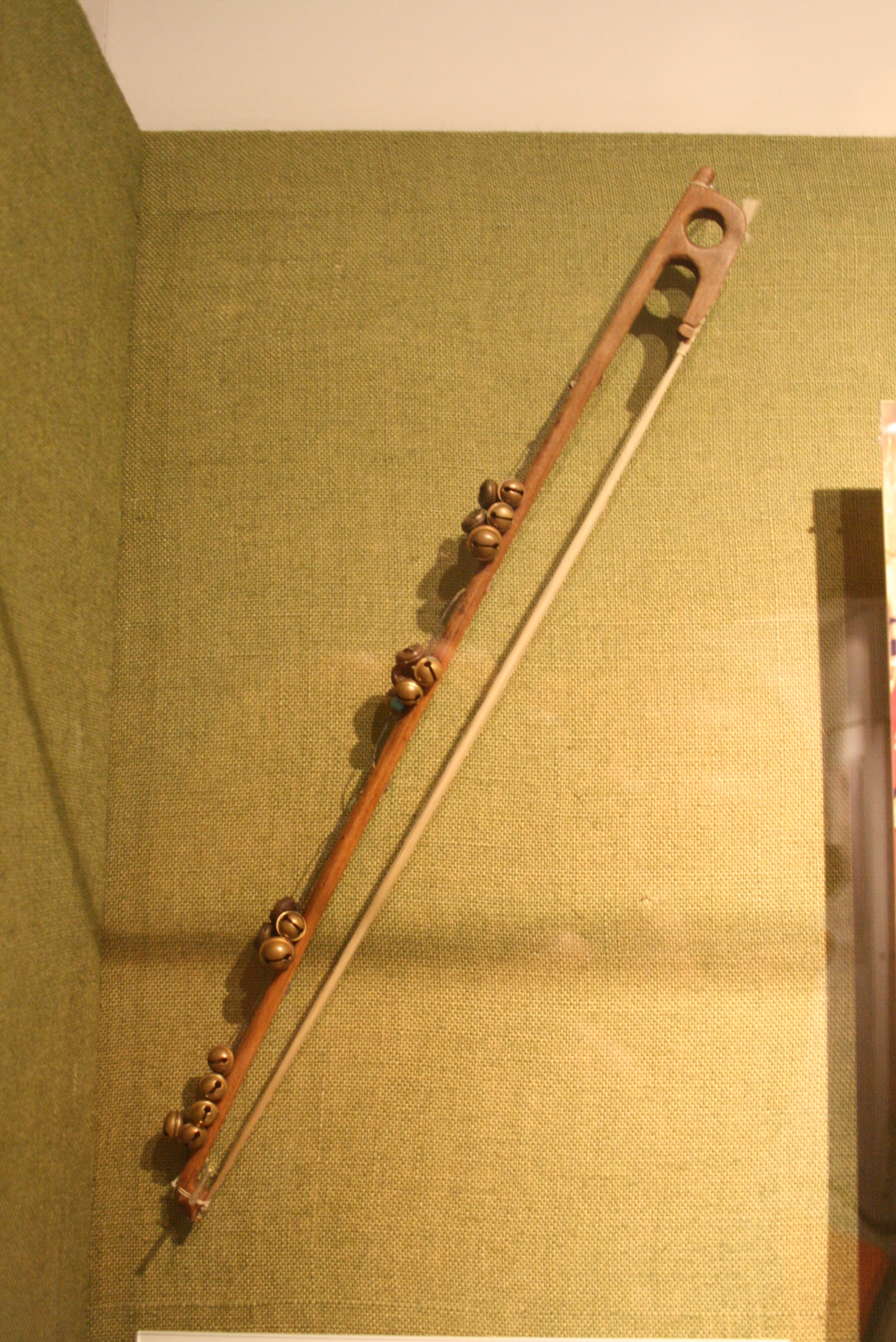
Bow with spherical bells (gerakokoudouna).

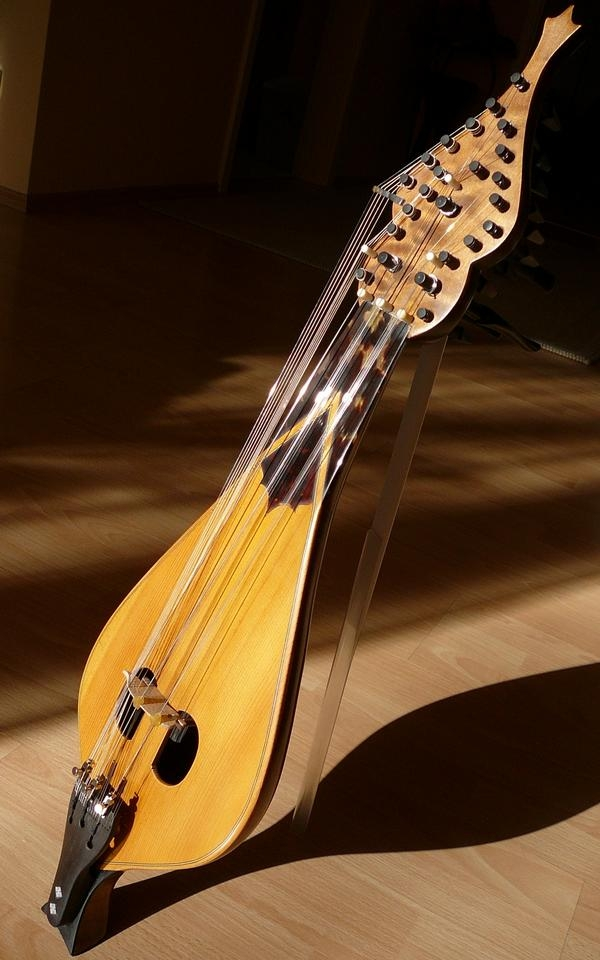
Cretan lyra with sympathetic strings, designed by Ross Daly.

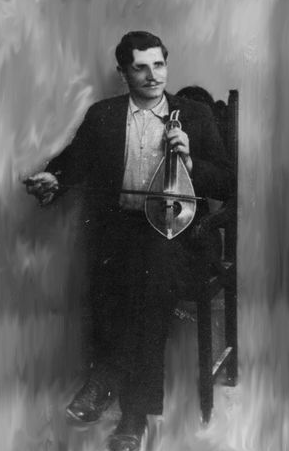
Kareklas (1893-1980).

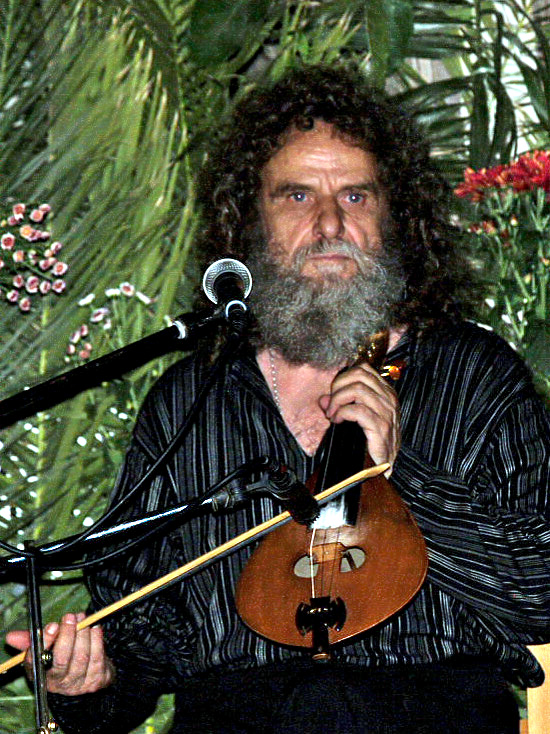
Psarantonis (1939-).

== Sources ==
- Anoyanakis, Fivos: Elliniká laiká mousiká órgana. Athens: E.T.E., 1976
- Anthony Baines: The Oxford Companion to Musical Instruments. Oxford University Press, 1990, p. 109
- Magrini, Tullia. 1997. The Cretan Lyra and the Influence of Violin. Ethnomusicology Online 3
- Margaret J. Kartomi: On Concepts and Classifications of Musical Instruments. Chicago Studies in Ethnomusicology, University of Chicago Press, 1990
