= Kouloukonas =

Kouloukonas Κουλούκωνας
- Municipal unit
- Location within the regional unit

- Location within Greece
- Coordinates: 35°19′N 24°48′E
- Country: Greece
- Administrative region: Crete
- Regional unit: Rethymno
- Municipality: Mylopotamos

Area
  - Municipal unit: 148.2 km^{2} (57.2 sq mi)

Population (2021)
  - Municipal unit: 4,098
  - Municipal unit density: 27.65/km^{2} (71.62/sq mi)
- Time zone: UTC+2 (EET)
  - Summer (DST): UTC+3 (EEST)
- Vehicle registration: ΡΕ

Kouloukonas (Greek: Κουλούκωνας) is a former municipality in the Rethymno regional unit, Crete, Greece. Since the 2011 local government reform it is part of the municipality Mylopotamos, of which it is a municipal unit. The municipal unit has an area of 148.187 km^{2} (57.215 sq mi). Population 4,098 (2021). The seat of the municipality was in Garazo.
