= Rebetes =

A rebetis (Greek: ρεμπέτης [re(m)ˈbetis]; pl. rebetes ρεμπέτες [re(m)ˈbetes]) was a musician involved in the scene of the Greek musical genre of rebetiko, which flourished between 1911 and 1967.

Prominent rebetes include:

- Rita Abatzi
- Angela Papazoglou
- Babis Tsertos
- Yiorgos Batis
- Sotiria Bellou
- Anestis Delias
- Kyria Koula
- Roza Eskenazi
- Mihalis Genitsaris
- Dimitris Gogos (Bayianderas)
- Giannis Eitziridis (Yovan Tsaous)
- Apostolos Hatzichristos
- Manolis Hiotis
- Manolis Chrysafakis
- Anna Chrysafi
- Apostolos Nikolaidis
- Marika Ninou
- Giannis Papaioannou
- Vangelis Papazoglou
- Stratos Pagioumtzis
- Stelios Perpiniadis (Stellakis)
- Kostas Roukounas
- Kostas Skarvelis
- Prodromos Tsaousakis
- Vassilis Tsitsanis
- Markos Vamvakaris (Markos)
- Kostas Kaplanis
- Andonis Kalyvopoulos
- A. Kostis
- Antonis Diamantidis (Antonis Dalgas)
- Giorgos Theologitis (Katsaros)
- Stelios Keromytis
- Giorgos Mouflouzelis
- Giorgos Kavouaras
- Odysseas Moshonas

Note: Sometimes (not without controversy) this definition is extended to include modern day performers of this kind of music, such as Babis Goles and Agathonas Iakovidis.

== Sources ==
- Damianakos Stathis, Κοινωνιολογία του Ρεμπέτικου 2nd Edition. Athens, Plethron, 2001.
- Gauntlett Stathis, Rebetika, Carmina Graeciae Recentoris. Athens, D. Harvey and Co., 1985.
- Hadjidakis Manos, Ερμηνεία και θέση του ρεμπέτικου τραγουδιού. 1949.
- Holst-Warhaft Gail, Road to Rembetika: Music of a Greek sub-culture, songs of love, sorrow and hashish, Athens, Denise Harvey, 1989
- Kotarides Nikos, Ρεμπέτες και ρεμπέτικο τραγούδι. Athens, Plethron, 1996.
- Kounades Panagiotis, Εις ανάμνησιν στιγμών ελκυστικών. Athens, Katarti, 2000.
- Petropoulos Elias, Ρεμπέτικα τραγούδια. Athens, 1968.
