= Nikos Vrachnas =

Rembitiko bouzouki player

Nikos Vrachnas (Greek: Νίκος Βραχνάς) was a rembetiko bouzouki player who in his playing evoked the Piraeus rembetiko style of the 1930s.

== Biography ==
Nikos Vrachnas was born into a poor family in Nikaia (Kokkinia), Piraeus. There is some uncertainty about his year of birth, which has been given variously as circa 1936, or 1941. He died in Piraeus in 2004. As a young man he worked in foundries, while later on he was better known as a second hand dealer and scrap metal collector. Never seeking publicity, he did not achieve popularity on a larger scale, though his musicianship was known and much appreciated within a small group of rebetes and fans during his lifetime.

== Musical background and style ==
Vrachnas began playing as a child in 1952. He became familiar as a youth with many of the legendary figures of rembetiko who at that time had been forgotten, such as Markos Vamvakaris, Yiorgos Batis, Stelios Keromitis, Nikos Tsokaropoulos and many others who played in the area. His style is a synthesis of the early styles of Markos Vamvakaris and Stelios Keromitis (with whom he learned) and the Piraeus school of the 1930s; traces of older styles also characterize his simple melodic taximia (improvisations) and powerfully played zeibekika, always executed with the use of open strings and his rough and passionate baritone voice.

== Recordings ==
Few live recordings of his playing survive to capture his original style, which survived basically unchanged until the 21st century. However, the rembetiko producer Charles Howard recorded sessions with Vrachnas in about 1980, and in 2000, of which three songs have been issued on CD: Vrachnas' own composition "Κάτω απ’ τη Σκάλα του Παπά" ('Down by the Priest's Jetty') (2000), "Ηθέλα να' μουν Ηρακλής" ('I wanted to be Hercules') by Markos Vamvakaris, and "Ραντεβόυ σαν περιμένω" ('Waiting for you on our date') by Ioannis Papaioannou. The rest of these recordings remain unissued. A number of privately recorded videos also survive.
