= Prodromos Tsaousakis =

Prodromos Tsaousakis Πρόδρομος Τσαουσάκης
- Born: Prodromos Moutafoglou; 15 September 1919; Constantinople
- Died: 23 October 1979 (aged 60) Kallithea, Greece
- Genres: Rebetiko, Laiko
- Occupations: songwriter, composer, singer
- Instrument: Bouzouki
- Years active: 1946–1979

Prodromos Moutafoglou (Greek: Πρόδρομος Μουτάφογλου, 15 September 1919 – 23 October 1979), better known by his stage name Prodromos Tsaousakis (Πρόδρομος Τσαουσάκης), was a popular Greek rebetiko singer, songwriter and composer.

== Biography ==
Tsaousakis was born in Constantinople,^{[a]} Greek religious base. At the age of three, he moved with his family to Thessaloníki. He became a professional wrestler at a young age and volunteered to the Greek army in 1940. During the Greco-Italian War he was promoted to sergeant for his bravery and gained the nickname Tsaousakis (from Tchaoush, Turkish: çavuş, i.e. sergeant). He was arrested and tortured during the German occupation.

In 1942, Tsaousakis met Anna Kadoglou and married her a year later. At that time, Tsaousakis sung with various bands in Thessaloniki and met Vassilis Tsitsanis. Tsaousakis' recording career started in 1946 and he quickly rose to fame. He worked until 1951 with Tsitsanis, who wrote several of his great songs inspired by Tsaousakis' voice. In later years, Tsaousakis cooperated with other composers such as Giannis Papaioannou, Giorgos Mitsakis, and Apostolos Kaldaras.

From 1955 onward, his career started to decline, partially due to the appearance of Stelios Kazantzidis.

Tsaousakis died of a heart attack on 23 October 1979, in Kallithea, Greece.
