= Stratos Pagioumtzis =

Singer from Rebetiko

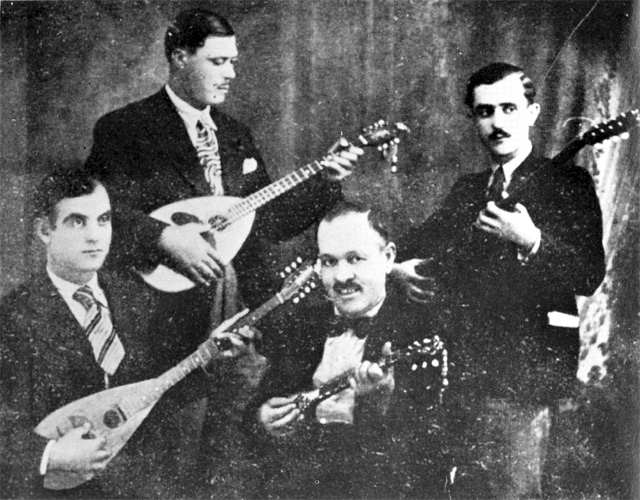
I Tetras tou Peiraia; Pagioumtzis is first from the left (mid 1930s).

Stratos Pagioumtzis (Greek: Στράτος Παγιουμτζής; 1904 – 16 November 1971) was a Greek rebetiko singer, also known with the nickname Stratos the sluggard (Στράτος ο τεμπέλης) or simply Stratos.

== Biography ==
Pagioumtzis was born in 1904 in the Asia Minor town of Ayvalık and he migrated to Greece before the Greco-Turkish war of 1919–1922. He settled in the port city of Piraeus and supported himself by working as a fisherman and later as a supplier of provisions to moored ships, but he always had in mind to earn his living from his greatest passion, music. He started to sing professionally in the late 1920s and his first recordings appeared in 1933.

In 1934, he got together with other Greek rebetiko singers Yiorgos Batis, Anestis Delias and Markos Vamvakaris, and founded the rebetiko quartet, I Tetras i Xakousti tou Peiraios (Greek: Η τετράς η ξακουστή του Πειραιώς, literally The famed quarted of Piraeus). In 1937, during the Metaxas dictator regime, he was convicted of drug use and was exiled internally to the Cycladic island of Sifnos.

Pagioumtzis had a beautiful voice, which earned him wide recognition. He is considered as one of the greatest singers of the classical rebetiko era. Pagioumtzis recorded over 400 songs with his voice and worked with many well-known composers such as Vassilis Tsitsanis, Giannis Papaioannou, Bayianteras, and Panagiotis Toundas. Vassilis Tsitsanis once said that Pagioumtzis had nightingales in his throat.

Pagioumtzis died of a stroke on 16 November 1971 in New York City, after completing a concert in a Greek nightclub.
