= Anestis Delias =

Greek musician (1912–1944)

Anestis Delias Ανέστης Δελιάς
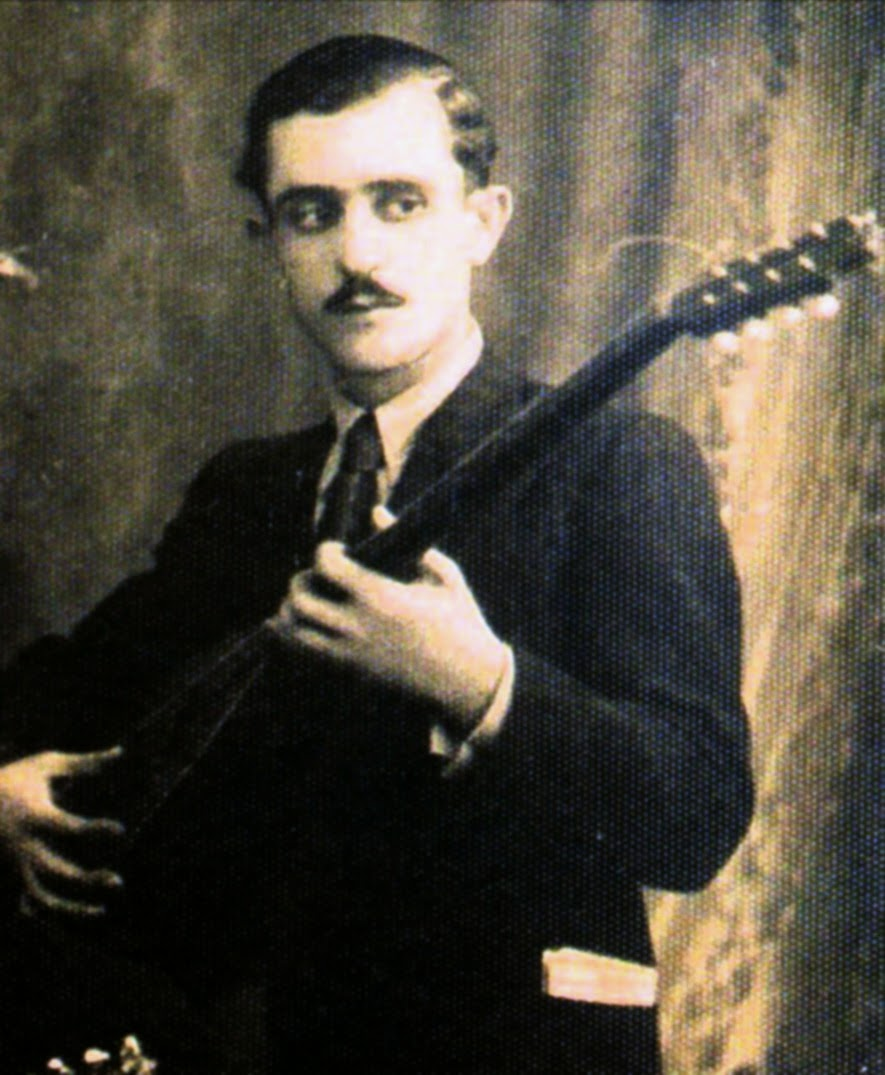
- Anestis Delias in about 1934.

Background information
- Also known as: 'Anestaki' (Ανεστάκι), 'Artemis' (Αρτέμης), 'Black Cat' ('Μαύρη Γάτα')
- Born: Anastasios Delios (Αναστάσιος Δέλιoς); 1912; Smyrna, Anatolia
- Died: 31 July 1944
- Genre: Rebetiko
- Occupations: Musician, composer, song-writer
- Instruments: Bouzouki, baglamas

Anestis Delias (Greek: Ανέστης Δελιάς; 1912 – 31 July 1944) was a Greek bouzouki player, composer and singer of rebetiko. Delias was from a musical family of Smyrna in Anatolia, who arrived on the Greek mainland as a young refugee during the Greco-Turkish war. He became an accomplished player of the bouzouki and joined with other musicians in the refugee suburbs of Athens and Piraeus, creating music in the 1930s that exemplifies the genre known as Piraeus rebetiko. Delias played on early rebetiko recordings, including songs of his own composition released under his name. He became addicted to heroin and died of starvation, aggravated by his drug dependency, during the Nazi occupation of Greece. Despite his short life, Anestis Delias was an important figure and an influential exponent of the Piraeus-style of rebetiko.

== Biography ==
=== Early life ===
Delias was born Anastasios Delios (Αναστάσιος Δέλιoς) in 1912 in Smyrna, on the Aegean coast of Anatolia. His father, Panagiotis Delios, was a shoemaker by profession and was a well-known professional musician in Asia Minor. The Delios family had a significant musical heritage; like his father before him, Panagiotis Delios played the santouri and his brother Michalis (Delias' uncle) played the violin. Delias' mother, Photina, was also a singer. Panagiotis Delios was known as 'Μαύρη Γάτα' ('Black Cat'), an epithet later given to Anestis Delias by his fellow musicians.

In July 1922, young Anestis, aged about ten years, arrived at the port of Piraeus in Greece with his pregnant mother and younger sister, refugees from the final stages of the Greco-Turkish war. His father had remained in Smyrna and was killed that year during the destruction and atrocities that occurred when the Turkish forces captured the city. The family settled at Drapetsona, one of the refugee neighbourhoods of Piraeus (on the northern side of the inlet), and Delias' sister Eleni was born soon afterwards. By 1928 the population of Athens almost doubled as a result of the mass movement of Christian refugees from Asia Minor to the Greek mainland, with the result that the city was surrounded by encampments and shanty towns such as Drapetsona and Kokkinia, with largely impoverished populations mostly speaking Turkish as their first language.

As the only son of the family, Anestis worked in many different jobs to support his widowed mother and two younger sisters. In about 1930 Delias found work in a tavern in Drapetsona, where met older bouzouki players such as Nikos Aivaliotis, as well as players closer to his own age such as Markos Vamvakaris and Stratos Pagioumtzis. In the inter-war years in Greece, the bouzouki was an instrument of low social standing, which was embraced by the new generation of musicians based in the urban refugee suburbs.

=== Musical career ===
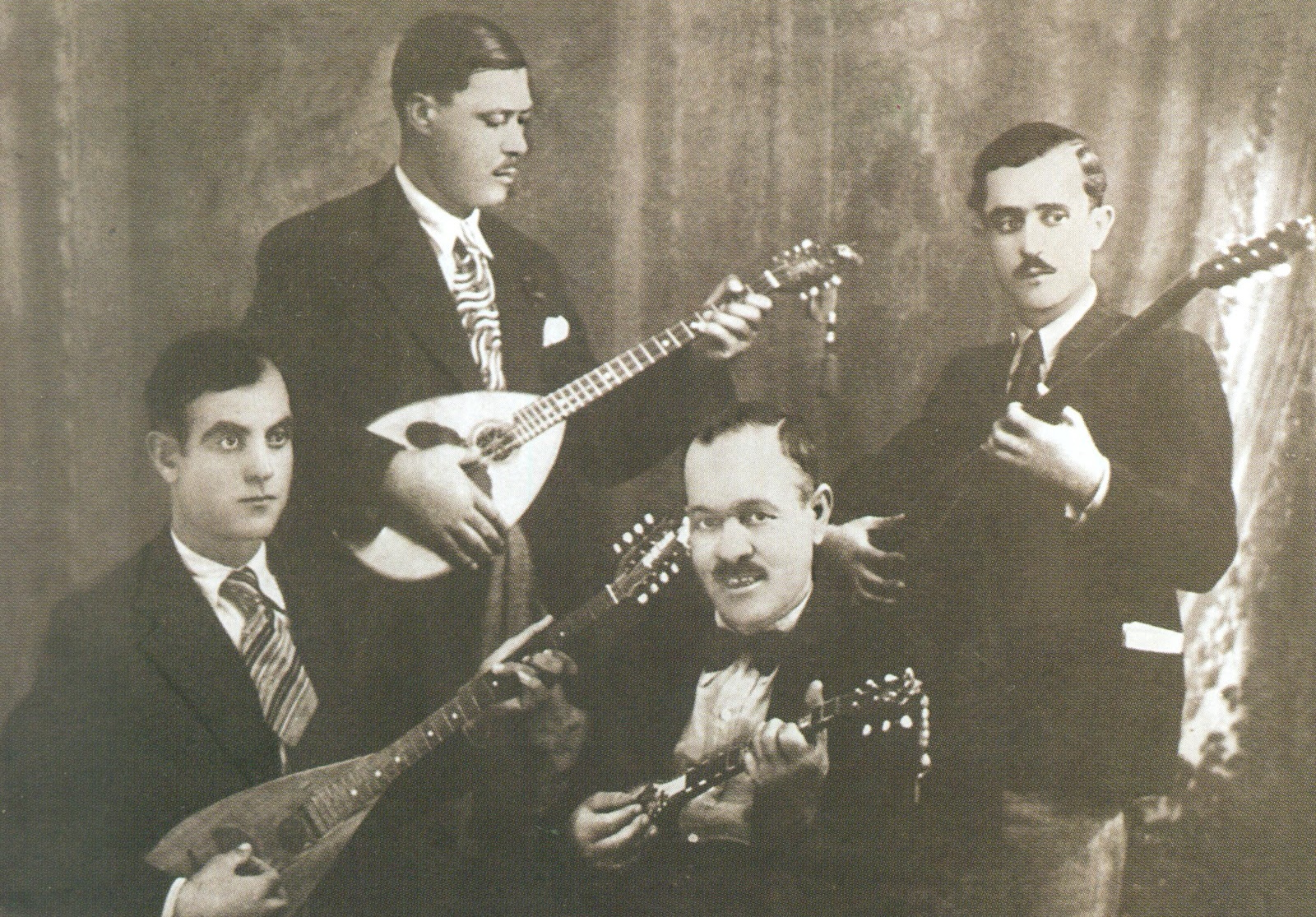
Members of The Famous Quartet of Pireaus, (l. to r.) Stratos Pagioumtzis, Markos Vamvakaris, Yiorgos Batis and Anestis Delias.

By the early 1930s, Anestis Delias had become known as a proficient player of the bouzouki and baglamas. In about 1933, he joined with fellow musicians Yiorgos Batis, Stratos Pagioumtzis and Markos Vamvakaris, to form the first professional rebetiko orchestra called I Tetras i Xakousti tou Peiraios (Greek: Η τετράς η ξακουστή του Πειραιώς, literally The Famous Quartet of Piraeus). Delias was the youngest member of the quartet. Both he and Payoumtzis were refugees from Asia Minor and Vamvakaris had moved to Piraeus from the island of Syros. Batis was the oldest of the group and the instigator for the formation of the ensemble. In 1934 the quartet gave its first professional performance at Sarantopoulos' tavern in Drapetsona. This quartet, and the recordings and subsequent careers of its individual members, influenced subsequent generations of musicians and composers.

Individual members of The Famous Quartet of Piraeus began recording songs from late 1932, with recording sessions which often included one or more of the other members of the quartet, as well as other rebetiko musicians. In 1933, Batis released a song he had written called "Spanish zeïbekáno (Quietly into a boat)" ["Ζεϊμπεκάνο Σπανιόλο (Ζούλα σε μια βάρκα μπήκα)"]. From acknowledgements between the musicians during the song, heard on the live studio recording, those playing on the record can be identified as Pagioumtzis (vocalist), Delias (bouzouki), Vamvakaris (bouzouki) and Batis (baglamas).

The early recordings by the members of The Famous Quartet of Piraeus, while dominated by the sounds of fretted instruments (the bouzouki and the baglamas), nevertheless "bear a distinct imprint of eastern modality and language" revealing the influence of the Anatolian refugees on the music. In acknowledgements and greetings between the musicians on the recorded songs, Delias was sometimes referred to as 'Anestaki' (Ανεστάκι), an affectionate version of Anestis (literally 'little Anestis'). He was also referred to as 'Artemis' (Αρτέμης) or 'Black Cat' ('Μαύρη Γάτα'), in both song lyrics and musicians’ acknowledgements.

The members of the quartet, and other rebétes (ρεμπέτες; rebetiko musicians) of the period, were the early exponents of the genre referred to as Pireaus rebetiko (Pireotika). The style of music featured a mix of modal and tonal structures performed on tempered instruments (mostly the bouzouki and the baglama, sometimes the guitar), with less ornamented voices and a rough style of singing. Piraeus rebetiko borrowed themes from the underworld (prison life, disdain of the police, use of hashish) which appealed to groups of the lower socio-economic strata and became popular in Greece as recordings became available during the 1930s.

Delias began to release songs under his own name in 1935; his first release was "The harem in the hamám" ("Το χαρέμι στο χαμάμ") backed with "The jacket" ("Το σακάκι"), released on the Greek division of the Columbia label. A total of ten songs were recorded under his name from 1935 to 1937, issued on the Columbia and His Master's Voice labels. On two of the songs issued under Delias' name, Stratos Pagioumtzis features as the vocalist, but Delias himself sings on most of his recordings. Delias also continued to play as a studio musician on the recordings of others during this period.

Soon after the imposition of the totalitarian Metaxas regime in Greece in August 1936, the Ministry of Press and Tourism was formed and given the responsibilities of supervision of the Greek and foreign press, the supervision of Greek cultural production and the 'enlightenment' of public opinion. By 1937, the Ministry had begun to impose censorship on musical records, with particular focus on rebetika, which was considered to be a debased Oriental music from the slums and outside of Greek tradition. The focus of attention was applied to the lyrics of songs, which were required to be submitted to the Ministry for approval. Lyrics were extensively censored, with songwriters forced to rewrite lyrics or practice self-censorship before submission.

=== Heroin addiction and death ===
By 1938, when Delias’ recording activities ceased, he had become addicted to heroin (an addiction that possibly began as early as 1935). In 1938, he was sentenced to eighteen months’ exile on the island of Ios because of his heroin use, as part of the Metaxas regime's policy of expelling drug addicts from urban centres to designated provincial areas. While on Ios Delias met up with Michalis Yenitsaris, his friend and a fellow rebetis, who had been exiled for a year on the island after being deemed to be ‘Δημόσιο Επικίνδυνο’ (a danger to the public). The island held a large number of exiled drug addicts and, according to Yenitsaris' account, during Delias' banishment on Ios he continued to use heroin.

After his release from Ios in about mid- to late-1939, Delias' lived with a prostitute named Koula Skoularikou, who was also a heroin addict. Various of Delias' friends and fellow musicians have described his unsuccessful attempts to work as a musician and to end his drug dependency. Friends such as Stratos Pagioumtzis and Bayianteras attempted to help him abstain from drugs, but without success. Delias' failure to give up heroin led to "his gradual, tragic decline".

In 1941 the Axis forces occupied Greece, with the country divided between Nazi Germany, Fascist Italy and Bulgaria. Germany administered the most strategically important zones, including Athens. The occupation by the Axis powers decimated the Greek economy and severely disrupted agricultural production, causing widespread hardship and famine amongst the Greek population.

The date of Delias' death has been the subject of speculation. Some sources claim he died in 1941 (the year of the beginning of the 'Great Famine' in Greece during the Axis occupation). However, further evidence, published in 2007, has revealed that Delias died in 1944. By that year, Delias was living with, and being cared for, by his old friend and fellow musician, Stratos Pagioumtzis, and Stratos' wife Zoe. In early February 1944, Delias was admitted to the Dromokaiteion Psychiatric Hospital, in the suburb of Haidari (west of central Athens), with Pagioumtzis listed as his guardian on the admission form. When he was released after several weeks on February 28, Delias refused to return to the Pagioumtzis household and probably died several months later. Some sources specify the date of Delias' death as 31 July 1944. It is generally agreed that Anestis Delias died of starvation, aggravated by his addiction to heroin. Most accounts claim his dead body was found on the street and was picked up by a municipal cart responsible for clearing the streets of corpses during the occupation by the Axis powers.

The nature and details of Delias' death has prompted many commentators to draw attention to the seemingly prophetic line of lyrics in Delias' song 'Ο πόνος του πρεζάκια' ('The pain of the junkie'), recorded in 1936: "η πρέζα μ’ έκανε στους δρόμους ν’ αποθάνω" ("the drugs have pushed me into the streets to die"). Markos Vamvakaris' comment that Delias was "an angel thrown in the garbage" is also often quoted.

== Assessment of Delias' legacy ==
Delias was a figure largely forgotten in the decades after his death, during a period when the 'Greekness' of the 1930s rebetika was being questioned, with commentators challenging the genre's contribution to modern Greek culture and identity because of its low-class origins and distinct Oriental elements and influences. The revival of rebetiko, which began in the 1960s, gathered pace in the mid-1970s after the collapse of the Greek military junta, leading to a more positive reassessment of the legacy of inter-war rebetiko and its leading exponents. A focus on rebetiko history and its sociological and cultural importance led to an intensified interest in the biographies of the rebétes musicians. The sources for determining the details of Delias' life are few. Primary sources include recorded songs, advertisements and a small number of photographs. However, most of the information comes from recorded interviews of his friends, fellow musicians and family members, which began to be published in magazines and newspapers in the 1970s. Historians of rebetika also recorded interviews with rebétes, providing commentary and additional information about Delias' life.

Despina Michael, in her examination of the depiction of Delias in the popular imagination, asserts that the paucity of firm evidence about Delias' life "has stimulated the mythopoetic tendencies of his various biographers" in their attempts to give "the shadowy figure of Delias substance and form". The bare outline of his "inherently tragic story" has been shaped to fit certain archetypal narratives, such as the victim unable to save himself, innocence succumbing to evil, or a symbol of lost youth. As a musician who died young, there is the added dimension of the tragic artist, overwhelmed by self-destruction and the wasted potential of the music he might have created. These factors have combined to give the present-day image of Delias many enduring qualities and a particular mythic potency.

== Discography ==
=== Original recordings ===
The following are the recordings released under Anestis Delias' name; each release was made up of two songs, one on each side of a 78 rpm gramophone record:

- "Το χαρέμι στο χαμάμ (Μες στης πόλης το χαμάμ)" ["The harem in the hamám (In the city’s hamám)"] b/w "Το σακάκι" ("The jacket") – Columbia (Greece) DG-6165 : CG-1308 / CG-1309 (1935).
- "Ο πόνος του πρεζάκια" ("The pain of the junkie") b/w "Ο Νίκος ο Τρελάκιας" ("Níkos the Crazy") – Columbia (Greece) DG-6185 : CG-1348 / CG-1349 (January 1936).
- "Το κουτσαβάκι (Βρε μάγκα, το μαχαίρι σου)" ["The koutsaváki (Hey mágka, your knife)"] b/w "Σούρα και μαστούρα" ("Drunk and stoned") – His Master's Voice (Greece) AO-2307 : OGA-334 / OGA-335 (1936).
- "Αθηναίισσα" ("Athenaiissa") b/w "Ραστ Νεβά μανές (Μόνον εγώ γεννήθηκα αμαρτωλός)" "Rast Neva manés (I alone was born a sinner)" [Stratos Pagioumtzis (vocals)] – His Master's Voice (Greece) AO-2375 : OGA-498 / OGA-499 (1937).
- "Ουσάκ (Το Τραγούδι Της Ξενιτειάς)" ["Uşşâk (The song of the foreigner)"] [Stratos Pagioumtzis (vocals)] b/w "Τον άντρα σου κι εμένα" ("Your husband and me") – Columbia (Greece) DG-6282 : CG-1546 / CG-1547 (1937).

=== Compilation ===
In 1988, the Αδελφοί Φαληρέα (Falireas Brothers) label, an independent Greek record label founded in the early 1980s, published an LP compilation of Delias' recordings (plus two songs released under Stratos Pagioumtzis' name, on which Delias played bouzouki). The compilation was later released on the Lyra label.

== Sources ==
- Despina Michael (2010), 'Μαύρη Γάτα: The Tragic Death and Long After-Life of Anestis Delias', Modern Greek Studies (Australia & New Zealand), Volume 14, pages 44–74.
- Stathis Gauntlett (2003), Chapter 18: 'Between Orientalism and Occidentalism: The Contribution of Asia Minor Refugees to Greek Popular Song, and its Reception', pages 247–260 (in) Renée Hirschon (ed.), Crossing the Aegean: An Appraisal of the 1923 Compulsory Population Exchange between Greece and Turkey, New York: Berghahn Books, ISBN 978-1-57181-767-9.
