= Yiorgos Batis =

Yiorgos Batis Γιώργος Μπάτης
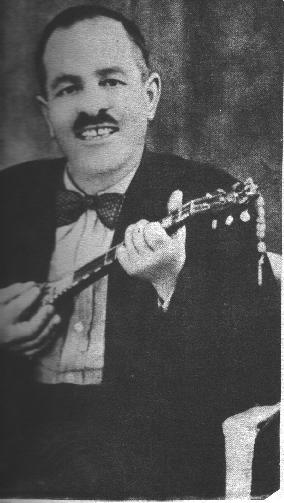
- Yiorgos Batis in the 1930s

Background information
- Also known as: Yiorgos Ampatis (Γιώργος Αμπάτης)
- Born: Yiorgos Tsoros (Γιώργος Τσώρος); 1885; Methana, Greece
- Died: 10 March 1967 (aged 81–82) Piraeus, Greece
- Genre: Rebetiko
- Occupations: Musician, composer, songwriter
- Instruments: Baglamas, bouzouki

Yiorgos Batis (also Giorgos Batis; Greek: Γιώργος Μπάτης; born Giorgos Tsoros (Γιώργος Τσώρος); 1885 – 10 March 1967) was one of the first rebetes influential to rebetiko music.

== Life and career ==
He was born in Methana in 1885 and moved to Piraeus when he was very young.

He served in the Greek army from 1912 to 1918. In the mid-1920s, he opened a music school called "Carmen". He opened a café named "Georges Baté" in 1931 and formed one of the most important scenes of rebetiko music. He continued to work as a quack salesman, improvising treatments for toothache and other minor ailments. He kept a collection of many instruments and also used to name them. In 1933, Yiorgos Batis did his first sound-recording with bouzouki in Greece. In the 1930s, he dedicated himself solely to music and collaborated closely with Anestis Delias, Markos Vamvakaris, and Stratos Pagioumtzis in a rebetiko band (Greek: Η τετράς η ξακουστή του Πειραιώς, romanized: I Tetras i Xakousti tou Peiraios, lit. 'the Famous Quartet of Piraeus').

He died in Piraeus on March 10, 1967.
