= Babis Tsertos =

Greek musician (born 1956)

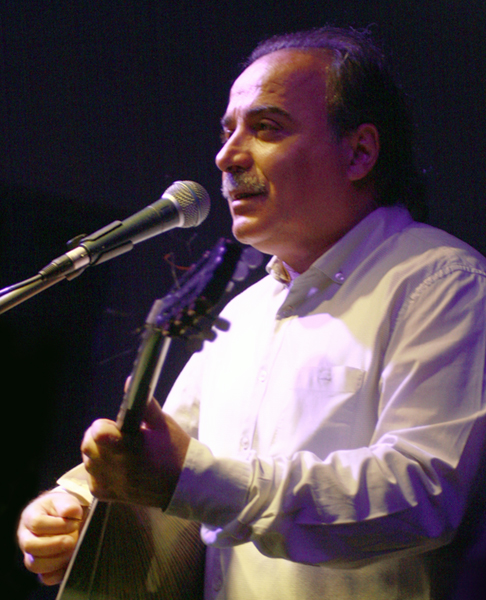

Background information
- Born: Χαράλαμπος); 27 October 1956 (age 69); Tropaia, Arcadia, Greece
- Origin: Tropaia, Greece
- Genres: Laïka, rebetiko, éntekhno, Greek folk
- Years active: 1980–present
- Website: www.babistsertos.gr

Charalambos (Babis) Tsertos (Greek: Χαράλαμπος (Μπάμπης) Τσέρτος; born October 27, 1956) is a Greek musician. His sister is the singer Nadia Karagianni and his father was also a musician who played the mandolin. At the age of 17, he settled permanently in Athens and in 1974, he entered the Faculty of Physics at the National and Kapodistrian University of Athens.

== Early years ==
As a student, he studied playing the bouzouki and participated in the University music band singing entexno, rebetiko and folk songs. In 1980, he started to work as a professional, singing at the tavern "Oi filoi" ("The Friends") at Kypseli, Athens.

== Collaborations ==
Since then, he has worked with great Greek artists, such as Sotiria Bellou, Takis Binis, Anna Chrysafi, Keti Gray, Kostas Kaplanis, Theodoros Polykandriotis, Koulis Skarpelis, Hondronakos, as well as with recent years singers such as Babis Goles, Giorgos Xindaris, Stelios Vamvakaris, Mario, Agathonas Iakovidis, Glykeria, Manolis Mitsias, Vicky Moscholiou, Lakis Halkias, Petros Vagiopoulos, Eleni Vitali, George Dalaras, Pantelis Thalassinos, Nadia Karagianni, Chronis Aidonidis, Theodosia Stiga, Sotiria Leonardou, and others.

In the recent years he is also cooperating with the Mandolin Orchestra of Exarchia "Dionisios Lavragas", which has given a series of concerts in many theaters and at the National Opera of Greece, with great lyrical artists. The culmination of this cooperation was his participation at the album "Diadromes" (music by Christos Nikolopoulos, lyrics by Fontas Ladis), that refers at the neighborhoods of Athens and is a live recording from the concert of the Mandolin Orchestra in the National Opera.

== Awards ==
In 2002, he won the award for the best singer of rebetiko at the "Corfu Awards" and in 2003, the award for the best folk album for "Anaglifa mias tehnis tapinis" at the "Arion Awards". He has also cooperated with the orchestra "Estudiantina" of Nea Ionia (Volos, Greece), presenting the great musical richness of the folk songs from Smyrne. He also participated in the album "Smyrne" of Estudiantina, that was released in 2003 as a production of George Dalaras with the participation of many great singers, that won the award for the best traditional album at the "Arion Awards".

== Discography ==
Babis Tsertos has 9 personal albums as well as several participations in other albums.

=== Personal albums ===
- 1993 - Atimi tihi
- 1996 - Erotopoulion
- 1998 - Ta niata ta berbandika
- 1999 - To meraklidiko pouli
- 2000 - Tis ligeris apenanti
- 2002 - Anaglifa mias tehnis tapinis
- 2006 - To monopati
- 2008 - O Babis Tsertos tragouda Mihali Souyioul (Babis Tsertos sings Mihalis Souyioul)
- 2010 - I girologi (Book + CD)
- 2010 - Stou paradisou to vitho

=== Participations ===
- 1988 - Babis Goles 6
- 1992 - Ellada stin iyia sou
- 1993 - I veterani tou rempetikou (The veterans of Rebetiko)
- 1995 - Tragoudopiion i orea Ellas
- 1995 - Me mia ombrela tripia
- 1996 - I rimes tis agapis
- 1996 - Me ti fora tou anemou
- 1997 - Gia sou kir-isagelea
- 1999 - I topi tis kardias mou
- 1999 - Drosostalida
- 2001 - Ta fantaristika
- 2001 - Saranta hronia tragoudia ke moussikes(Forty years of songs and music)
- 2002 - Ta Arkadika
- 2002 - Diadromes
- 2003 - Paravasis
- 2003 - Egeo
- 2003 - Smyrne
- 2003 - Xigimena ke parexigimena
- 2005 - Isovia
- 2006 - I Estudiadina parousiazi tin orhistra laikon organon "Odissos"
- 2006 - Spai to rodi
- 2007 - Laika fegaria
- 2007 - To telefteo mou tsigaro
- 2008 - Tragoudia me ousies
- 2008 - Attik - Tribute
- 2008 - Handra-Handra tragoudo
- 2009 - Panigiri sto Pertouli
- 2009 - Sta monopatia tis paradosis
- 2009 - Me ton Obama adama
- 2009 - Na ta poume?
- 2011 - Gerapetros - Traditional Songs & Carols from Crete
- 2011 - Carmina Graeca
- 2011 - Stou hronou tis katapaktes
- 2011 - Dose mou mia spitha ap' to fili sou
- 2011 - Osa hronia ki an perasoun

=== Collections ===
Personal Collections

- 2005 - Deka hronia tragoudia (10 years songs)
- 2007 - Glenti me ton Tserto

Collections of the "Rebetiki Tetras" (Glykeria, Agathonas Iakovidis, Babis Tsertos, Babis Goles)

- 1997 - Pino ke metho
- 1998 - Me paresire to rema
- 2003 - Tis gerakinas gios
- 2004 - Arhisan ta organa

== Sources ==
- "Guide of Hellenic Discography", by Petros Dragoumanos
