= Stathis Damianakos =

Greek sociologist

Stathis Damianakos (Greek: Στάθης Δαμιανάκος; 1939–2003) is considered one of the most prominent researchers in the fields of agriculture, ethnological and cultural sociology in Greece. Among his most known works are the "Sociology of Rebetiko" and "Paradosi antarsias kai laikos politismos" (Tradition of mutiny and popular culture). Damianakos was a Marxist sociologist and was professor at the University Paris X. In 2002 he was invited as a guest professor in the University of Crete in Rethymnon. Little before he was found dead in his apartment in Paris, he had expressed his wish to continue teaching in Crete. In May 2005 a conference to his memory was held in Athens.
