= Sotiria Bellou =

Greek singer (1921–1997)

Background information
- Born: August 22, 1921; Drosia, Euboia, Greece
- Died: August 27, 1997 (aged 76) Athens, Greece
- Genre: Rebetiko
- Occupation: Singer
- Years active: 1941–1995
- Formerly of: Vassilis Tsitsanis, Markos Vamvakaris

Sotiria Bellou (Greek: Σωτηρία Μπέλλου; August 22, 1921 – August 27, 1997) was a Greek singer and performer of the rebetiko style of music. She was one of the most famous rebetissa of all. (Note: A female singer of rebetiko is called in Greek ρεμπέτισσα (rebetisa), plural ρεμπέτισσες (rebetises).) On March 14, 2010, Alpha TV ranked Bellou the 22nd top-certified female artist in the nation's phonographic era (since 1960).

== Early years ==
Bellou was born in Halia (now called Drosia, part of the town of Chalkida) on the island of Euboia. She was the oldest of five siblings of a wealthy family. Her grandfather Sotiris Papasotiriou, after whom she was named and who was particularly fond of her, was an Orthodox priest at Shimatari. As a little girl, Sotiria would go to church along with her grandfather and she would absorb the religious sounds and Byzantine hymns. She began singing at the age of three, and was soon making her own guitars out of wire and wood and playing them. Her father, Kyriakos Bellos, had a grocery store in Neapolis in the northern part of Chalkida. The movie "The little emigree" (I prosphygopoula), featuring the popular singer Sofia Vembo was the catalyst that pushed her to pursue an artistic career. On hearing of her daughter's ambitions, her mother Eleni beat her because, as a conservative woman of that time, she did not want her daughter to pursue an artistic career. However, her father bought her a guitar and paid for private lessons.

== Career ==
In 1940, she moved to Athens. Her arrival there coincided with World War II (October 28, 1940 – the day Italy declared war on Greece) and a new challenging period started for Bellou. Her family completely lost touch with her. They found her again after seven years, singing with legendary rebetiko composer Vassilis Tsitsanis. In the meantime, she had worked as a servant at a wealthy lawyer's house, as a hawker selling pasteli (παστέλι), as a luggage carrier and in many other different jobs. One night she was working as a waitress in a rebetiko club in the Exarheia neighborhood of downtown Athens and sang two songs after a bet with a customer. Kimonas Kapetanakis happened to be there and recognised her genuine talent. He introduced her to Tsitsanis, who instantly became fond of her powerful and melodic voice, and with whom she recorded the first of her many 78 rpm gramophone records.

In December 1948, after a beating by a group of right-wingers (see Activism below), she moved from the "Tzimis o Hontros" club to the "Panagaki" where she worked with Markos Vamvakaris.

She sang in the best music clubs of Athens, such as the Rosiniol, Tzimis o Hontros, Hydra, Triana, Falirikon and many more. As the times changed, and rebetiko was no longer sought after, Sotiria, like many other artists of her generation, found very little work in night clubs.The mid-1960s brought with them a sense of cultural awakening, and a new-found interest in rebetiko among young people, which peaked in the 1980s. Sotiria was heard on many recordings and helped usher in a new era for rebetiko.

== Works ==
During her career from 1941 to 1976, she collaborated with the best composers of rebetiko. Some of her greatest hits were:

- Synefiasmeni Kyriakh (Συννεφιασμένη Κυριακή) (Cloudy Sunday) by Vassilis Tsitsanis
- Kavourakia (Καβουράκια) by Vassilis Tsitsanis
- Otan pineis stihn taverna (Όταν πίνεις στην ταβέρνα) by Vassilis Tsitsanis
- Kane ligaki ypomoni (Κάνε λιγάκι υπομονή) by Vassilis Tsitsanis
- Pos tha perasei i vradia (Πώς θα περάσει η βραδιά) by Yannis Papaioannou
- Kane kourayio kardia mou (Κάνε κουράγιο καρδιά μου) by Yannis Papaioannou
- Anoixe, anoixe (Άνοιξε, άνοιξε) by Yannis Papaioannou
- O naftis (Ο ναύτης) by Giorgos Mitsakis
- To svisto fanari (Το σβηστό φανάρι) by Mitsakis
- Eipa na sviso ta palia (Είπα να σβήσω τα παλιά) by Apostolos Kaldaras
- Laiko Tsigaro (Λαϊκό τσιγάρο) by Apostolos Kaldaras

== Activism ==
Bellou was also a political activist who joined the Greek Resistance against the Axis occupation of Greece during World War II. She was caught by the Nazis, tortured and then put into prison. In 1944 she participated in the Dekemvriana as a member of the Greek People's Liberation Army (ELAS). During the civil war she supported the leftists and she was caught at least once and kept in detention.

Members of extreme right groups never forgave her political stance and her participation in the Dekemvriana and in one incident they visited the club "Tzimis o hontros" where she was singing on stage with Peristeris, Kasimatis, Keromytis, Stelios, Roukounas and Tourkakis, and demanded that she sing a famous right wing song. After her refusal she was beaten by six members of the royalist group X, also known as 'Chites' (Χίτες), who threatened to kill her and called her "vulgara" (Bulgarian, a common slur for communists and leftists used by the royalists). Years afterwards she still expressed her grievance that not one man from those in the club and none of her colleagues stood up to defend her.

== Personal life ==
In 1938, at the age of 17 she met her future husband Vangelis Trimouras, a bus conductor. Her father arranged her marriage despite her objections because he thought that her husband could tame her. Their marriage lasted for only six months as he reportedly abused her, even causing her a miscarriage. During one of their fights, she reacted by throwing vitriol, a corrosive acid, in his face. She was sentenced to three years and three months imprisonment. She spent three months in prison at Chalkida before the trial and one month at the Averof prison in Athens. She appealed and her sentence was reduced to six months. After paying for bail, she returned to her home town where she was treated with hostility and was often beaten by her relatives for the embarrassment that she supposedly brought to her family.

In her personal life, she had two big weaknesses: gambling and alcohol, which eventually led her to poverty and caused her mental problems. She was treated in a psychiatric clinic on at least one occasion. Sotiria was openly a lesbian in a time when this was practically unheard of.

Sotiria's grandfather was a priest, and she herself was a devout Orthodox Christian.

== Illness and death ==
Although she was particularly admired by artists, critics, and the public, she was alone and ignored towards the end of her life. Only a handful of people supported her in the last stages of her year-long struggle with throat cancer with which she was diagnosed in 1993. She died in Athens on August 27, 1997, and she was buried according to her request in the First Cemetery of Athens next to Vassilis Tsitsanis.

== Legacy ==
Her talent has attracted many celebrities and she had many famous fans. Among them was the famous Greek painter Yannis Tsarouchis who would burst into tears each time he listened to her singing. Paradoxically, the government never honoured her during her lifetime, perhaps due to her controversial personality. Only after her death was she regarded significantly.

Her biography was published in 1998 under the title "Sotiria Bellou – Pote dortia pote exares". The author of the biography also wrote a theatrical play by the title "Sotiria me lene", a production sponsored in 2008 by the Hellenic Broadcasting Corporation (ERT) and starring Lida Protopsalti.
