= Rebetiko =

Greek music genre

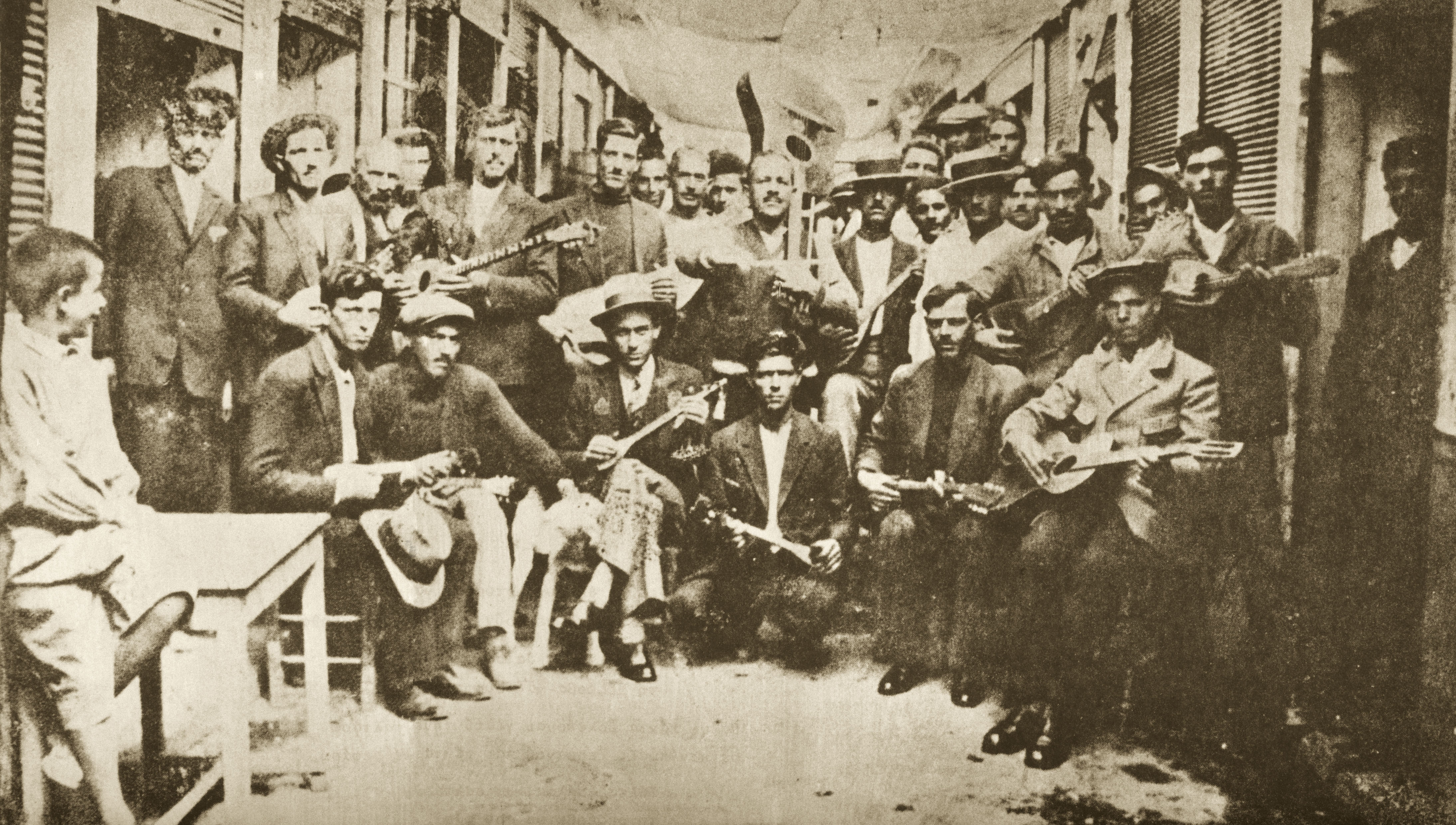
- Rebetes in the Karaiskaki Square, Piraeus (1933)
- Native name: Ρεμπέτικο
- Other names: Rembetico; rebetico
- Stylistic origins: Greek folk music; Byzantine music; Turkish makams; Arabic maqams
- Cultural origins: Late 19th century Greece and Asia Minor
- Derivative forms: Smyrna style rebetiko; laïko

Fusion genres
- Rebetiko rock

Rebetiko
- UNESCO Intangible Cultural Heritage
- Country: Greece
- Reference: 01291
- Region: Europe and North America

Inscription history
- Inscription: 2017 (12th session)
- List: Representative

Rebetiko (Greek: ρεμπέτικο, pronounced [re(m)ˈbetiko]), plural rebetika (ρεμπέτικα [re(m)ˈbetika]), occasionally transliterated as rembetiko or rebetico, is a term used to designate previously disparate kinds of urban Greek music which in the 1930s went through a process of musical syncretism and developed into a more distinctive musical genre. Rebetiko can be described briefly as the urban popular song of the Greeks, especially the poorest, from the late 19th century to the 1950s, and served as the basis for further developments in popular Greek music. The music, which was partly forgotten, was rediscovered during the so-called rebetika revival, which started in the 1960s and developed further from the early 1970s.

In 2017 rebetiko was added in the UNESCO Intangible Cultural Heritage Lists.

== Definition and etymology ==
The word rebetiko (plural rebetika) is an adjectival form derived from the Greek word rebetis (Greek: ρεμπέτης, pronounced [re(m)ˈbetis]), which is construed to mean a person who embodies aspects of character, dress, behavior, morals and ethics associated with a particular subculture. The etymology of rebetis remains a subject of dispute and uncertainty. An early scholar of rebetiko, Elias Petropoulos, and the modern Greek lexicographer Georgios Babiniotis each offer suggested derivations, but leave the question open. The earliest known source of the word is a Greek-Latin dictionary published in Leiden, Holland in 1614 where the word ῥεμπιτός is defined as a 'wanderer', 'blind', 'misguided'.

== Musical bases ==
Although nowadays treated as a single genre, rebetiko is, musically speaking, a synthesis of elements of European music, the music of the various areas of the Greek mainland and the Greek islands, Greek Orthodox ecclesiastical chant, often referred to as Byzantine music, and the modal traditions of Ottoman art music and café music.

=== Melody and harmony ===
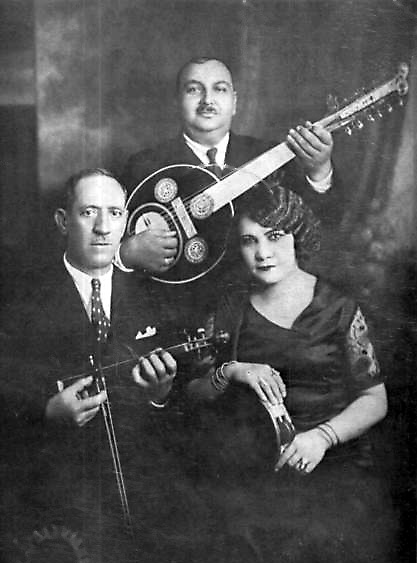
Dimitrios Semsis (violin), Agapios Tomboulis (oud) and Roza Eskenazi (voice), the Smyrna Trio (Athens, 1932)

The melodies of most rebetiko songs are thus often considered to follow one or more dromoi (δρόμοι, Greek for 'roads' or 'routes'; singular is dromos (δρόμος). (Note: The word dromos means 'path' or 'road'.) The names of the dromoi are derived in all but a few cases (Note: Piraeotiko dromos is named after the harbour town of Piraeus, and the terms matzore (ματζόρε) and minore (μινόρε) are loosely used in order to include the Western major and minor scale variations within the category of dromoi.) from the names of various Turkish modes, also known as makam.

However, the majority of rebetiko songs have been accompanied by instruments capable of playing chords according to the Western harmonic system, and have thereby been harmonized in a manner which corresponds neither with conventional European harmony, nor with Ottoman art music, which is a monophonic form normally not harmonized. Furthermore, rebetika has come to be played on instruments tuned in equal temperament, in direct conflict with the more complex pitch divisions of the makam system.

During the later period of the rebetiko revival, there has been a cultural entente between Greek and Turkish musicians, mostly of the younger generations. One consequence of this has been a tendency to increase emphasis on the makam aspect of rebetiko as opposed to the Westernized polyphonic components, at the possible expense of perceiving and problematizing the truly syncretic nature of the music. (Note: A further genre term has recently seen the light as a result of this entente. Paradosiaká, a word which originally simply means "traditional", is nowadays used to refer to a fairly narrow urban musical form which has emerged in Greece since the 1970s, and which almost exclusively employs the instruments and musical language of Ottoman art music. For a detailed examination of this phenomenon, see Eleni Kallimopoulou, Paradosiaká: Music, Meaning and Identity in Modern Greece. Ashgate, 2009.)

A considerable proportion of the rebetiko repertoire on Greek records until 1936 was not dramatically different, except in terms of language and musical "dialect", from Ottoman café music (played by musicians of various ethnic backgrounds) which the mainland Greeks called Smyrneika. This portion of the recorded repertoire was played almost exclusively on the instruments of Smyrneika/Ottoman café music, such as kanonaki, santouri, politikí lyra (πολίτικη λύρα), tsimbalo (τσίμπαλο, actually identical with the Hungarian cimbalom, or the Romanian țambal), and clarinet.

=== Scales ===
The scales used in rebetiko music are the traditional Western major and minor scales, as well as a series of Eastern makams, influenced by the Ottoman classical music. Some of them include rast, uşşâk, hijaz (or "phrygian dominant scale"), saba(h) and nahawand. The makam system of modes serves as the melodic core of any Rebetiko composition.

=== Rhythms ===
Most rebetiko songs are based on traditional Greek or Anatolian dance rhythms. Most common are:

- Syrtos, a general name for many Greek dances (including the Nisiotika), (mostly a 4/4 meter in various forms)
- Zeibekiko, a 9/4 or a 9/8 meter, in its various forms
- Hasaposervikos, including various kinds of Greek music. It is also the fast version of hasapiko (like 4/4 and 2/4 meter)
- Hasapiko, a 4/4 meter and the fast version hasaposerviko in a 2/4 meter
- Antikristos or Karsilamas and argilamas (a 9/8 meter)
- Kamilierikos (a 9/8 meter) and aptalikos, broken down into sixteenths, (slow version a 9/4 and fast version a 9/16 meter in various forms
- Tsifteteli, cheerful dance for women (a 4/4)
- Bolero, in a few songs, mainly for guitar (a 3/4)

Various other rhythms are used too.

=== Taxim ===
There is one component within the rebetiko tradition which is common to many musical styles within Eastern musical spheres. This is the freely improvised unmeasured prelude, within a given dromos/makam, which can occur at the beginning or in the middle of a song. This is known in Greek as taxim or taximi (ταξίμ or ταξίμι) after the Arabic word usually transliterated as taqsim or taksim.

== Instruments ==
The first rebetiko songs to be recorded, as mentioned above, were mostly in Ottoman/Smyrna style, employing instruments of the Ottoman tradition. During the second half of the 1930s, as rebetiko music gradually acquired its own character, the bouzouki began to emerge as the emblematic instrument of this music, gradually ousting the instruments which had been brought over from Asia Minor.

=== The bouzouki ===
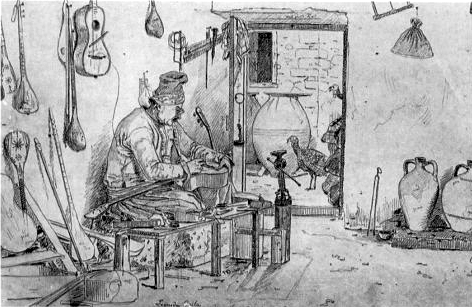
Martinus Rørbye (1835): Leonidas Gailas da Athina, Fabricatore di bossuchi

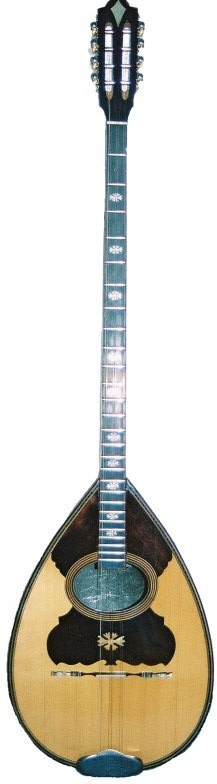
Trixordo or three course (three double string) bouzouki

The bouzouki was apparently not particularly well known among the refugees from Asia Minor, but had been known by that name in Greece since at least 1835, from which year a drawing by the Danish artist Martinus Rørbye has survived. It is a view of the studio of the Athenian luthier Leonidas Gailas (Λεωνίδας Γάϊλας), whom the artist describes as Fabricatore di bossuchi. The drawing clearly shows a number of bouzouki-like instruments. Despite this evidence, we still know nothing of the early history of the instrument's association with what came to be called rebetiko. Recent research has however uncovered a number of hitherto unknown references to the instrument during the 19th and early 20th centuries, including evidence of its established presence in the Peloponnese.

Although known in the rebetiko context, and often referred to in song lyrics, well before it was allowed into the recording studio, the bouzouki was first commercially recorded not in Greece, but in America, in 1926, when the Peloponnesian musician Konstandinos Kokotis (1878 – after 1948) recorded two Peloponnesian folk songs with the accordionist Ioannis Sfondilias. This recording, reissued for the first time in 2013, reveals a "folk" melodic style never recorded before or since. The first recording to feature the instrument clearly in a recognisable somewhat more "modern" melodic role, was made in 1929, in New York. Three years later the first true bouzouki solo was recorded by Ioannis Halikias, also in New York, in January 1932.

In Greece the bouzouki had been allowed into a studio for the first time a few months previously, in October 1931. In the hands of Thanassis Manetas (1870-ca 1943), together with the tsimbalo player Yiannis Livadhitis, it can be heard accompanying the singers Konstantinos Masselos, aka Nouros, and Spahanis, on two discs, three songs in all.

These early commercial recordings in America and in Greece had however been preceded by a group of documentary recordings, consisting of one shellac 78 rpm disc and five wax cylinders, made in Görlitz, Germany in July 1917, during WWI. The amateur bouzouki player Konstandinos Kalamaras accompanied a professional Byzantine singer, Konstandinos Vorgias, and an amateur singer, Apostolos Papadiamantis. These three men were among 6500 Greek soldiers interned as guests of Germany in an ex-POW camp in the small town of Görlitz at the Polish border, from September 1916 until their release in February 1919.

It was not until October 1932, in the wake of the success of Halikias' New York recording, which immediately met with great success in Greece, that Markos Vamvakaris made his first recordings with the bouzouki. These recordings marked the real beginning of the bouzouki's recorded career in Greece, a career which continues unbroken to the present day.

=== Other instruments ===
The core instruments of rebetiko, from the mid-1930s onwards, have been the bouzouki, the baglamas and the guitar. Other instruments included accordion, politiki (Constantinopolitan) lyra (sometimes other lyra were used), clarinet, kanonaki, oud, santur, violin and finger-cymbals. Other instruments heard on rebetiko recordings include: double bass, laouto, mandola, mandolin and piano. In some recordings, the sound of clinking glass may be heard. This sound is produced by drawing worry beads (komboloi) against a fluted drinking glass, originally an ad hoc and supremely effective rhythmic instrument, probably characteristic of teké and taverna milieux, and subsequently adopted in the recording studios.

== Lyrics ==
Like several other urban subcultural musical forms such as the blues, flamenco, fado, bal-musette and tango, rebetiko grew out of particular urban circumstances. Often its lyrics reflect the harsher realities of a marginalized subculture's lifestyle. Thus one finds themes such as crime, drink, drugs, poverty, prostitution and violence, but also a multitude of themes of relevance to Greek people of any social stratum: death, eroticism, exile, exoticism, disease, love, marriage, matchmaking, the mother figure, war, work, and diverse other everyday matters, both happy and sad. (Note: A both extensive and intensive English-language analytic study of rebetiko lyrics is given by Stathis Gauntlett.)

The womb of rebetika was the jail and the hash den. It was there that the early rebetes created their songs. They sang in quiet, hoarse voices, unforced, one after the other, each singer adding a verse which often bore no relation to the previous verse, and a song often went on for hours. There was no refrain, and the melody was simple and easy. One rebetis accompanied the singer with a bouzouki or a baglamas (a smaller version of the bouzouki, very portable, easy to make in prison and easy to hide from the police), and perhaps another, moved by the music, would get up and dance. The early rebetika songs, particularly the love songs, were based on Greek folk songs and the songs of the Greeks of Smyrna and Constantinople.

— Elias Petropoulos

Manos Hatzidakis summarized the key elements in three words with a wide presence in the vocabulary of modern Greek meraki, kefi, and kaimos (μεράκι, κέφι, καημός: love, joy, and sorrow).

A perhaps over-emphasized theme of rebetiko is the pleasure of using drugs (cocaine, heroin-preza etc.), but especially hashish. (Note: A database search in the comprehensive Greek 78 rpm discography by Dionysis Maniatis (Note: Comprehensive list of Greek 78 rpm issues including title, artist(s), composer(s) and genre assignation.) reveals that less than 7% of recorded rebetiko songs have drug-related themes.) Rebetiko songs emphasizing such matters have come to be called hasiklidika (χασικλίδικα), although musically speaking they do not differ from the main body of rebetiko songs in any particular way.

== Culture ==
Rebetiko is closely related with nightlife entertainment: ouzeri, taverna (Greek tavern) and night centres.

Rebetiko is also sometimes related with the icon of mangas (Greek: μάγκας, pronounced [ˈma(ŋ)ɡas]), which means strong guy that "needs correction", a social group in the Belle Époque era's counterculture of Greece (especially of the great urban centers: Athens, Piraeus, and Thessaloniki).

Mangas was a label for men belonging to the working class, behaving in a particularly arrogant/presumptuous way, and dressing with a very typical vesture composed of a woolen hat (kavouraki, καβουράκι), a jacket (they usually wore only one of its sleeves), a tight belt (used as a knife case), stripe pants, and pointy shoes. Other features of their appearance were their long moustache, their bead chaplets (κομπολόγια, sing. κομπολόι), and their idiosyncratic manneristic limp-walking (κουτσό βάδισμα). A related social group were the Koutsavakides (κουτσαβάκηδες, sing. κουτσαβάκης); the two terms are occasionally used interchangeably.

== History ==
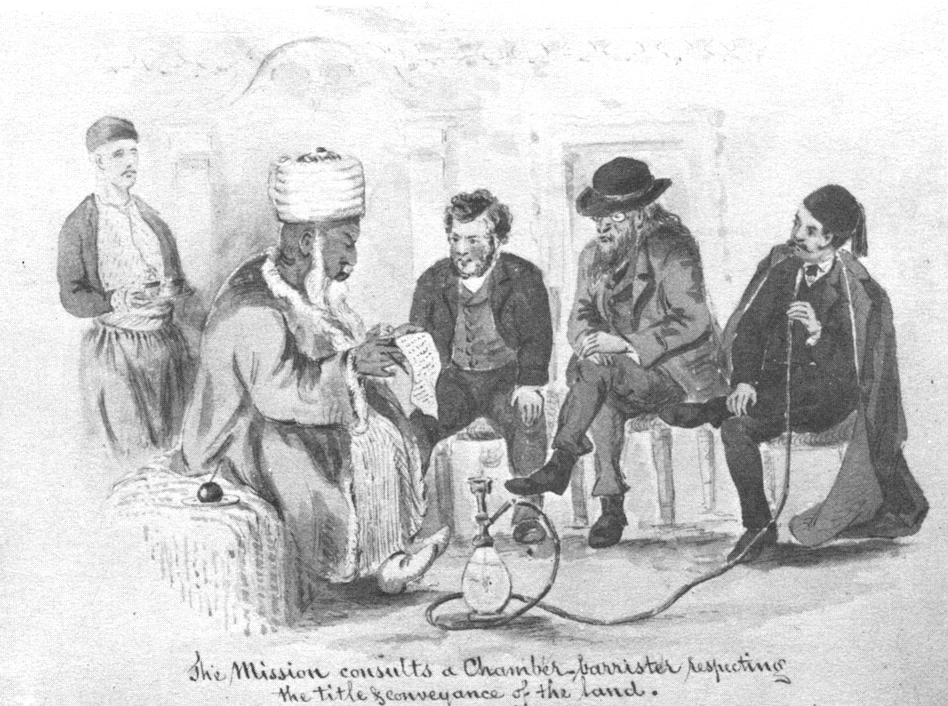
Depiction of a hookah shop in the Ottoman Empire.

Initially a music associated with the lower classes, rebetiko later reached greater general acceptance as the rough edges of its overt subcultural character were softened and polished, sometimes to the point of unrecognizability. Then, when the original form was almost forgotten, and its original protagonists either dead, or in some cases almost consigned to oblivion, it became, from the 1960s onwards, a revived musical form of wide popularity, especially among younger people of the time.

=== Origins ===
Rebetiko probably originated in the music of the large (mainly) coastal cities with large Greek communities of Western Anatolia during the Ottoman era. In these cities the cradles of rebetiko were likely the ouzeri, the hashish dens (tekedes) with hookahs, coffee shops and even the prison. In view of the paucity of documentation prior to the era of sound recordings it is difficult to assert further facts on the very early history of this music. (Note: Although Petropoulos, for example, divides the history of the style into three periods: 1922–1932 – the era when rebetiko emerged from its roots with the mixture of elements from the music of Asia Minor and mainland Greece, 1932–1942 – the classical period, 1942–1952 – the era of discovery, spread, and acceptance.; This division, though possibly useful as a rough guide, is slightly misleading as it excludes not only the unknowable pre-sound recording era, but the relatively few, but no less significant, recordings made during the first two decades of the 20th century.) There is a certain amount of recorded Greek material from the first two decades of the 20th century, recorded in Constantinople/Istanbul, Egypt and in America, of which isolated examples have some bearing on rebetiko, such as in the first case of the use of the word itself on a record label. But there are no recordings from this early period which give an inkling of the local music of Piraeus such as first emerged on disc in 1931 (see above).

=== Smyrna style (Smyrneïko) ===
Smyrna style rebetiko (Smyrneïko)
- Stylistic origins: Rebetiko; Turkish makams
- Cultural origins: early 20th century, Asia Minor
- Typical instruments: Politiki lyra; Oud; Cimbalom; bouzouki; toubeleki

Minore from Smyrna
"Smyrna Minore", traditional, sings Marika Papagika, 1918

Smyrnia
"Smyrna girl", traditional, sings Giorgos Vidalis, 1924

During the early 20th century, the main centre of rebetiko music was the multi-national port of Smyrna (modern İzmir) in Asia Minor. The musicians of Smyrna were influenced not only by the Eastern sounds inside the Ottoman Empire, but also by the European-style music of the many European communities of the city, most notably the Italians. Smyrneiki Estudiantina was a group of musicians playing popular music for Greeks worldwide. After the Great fire of Smyrna, many of them (Panagiotis Toundas, Angela Papazoglou, Spyros Peristeris, Giorgos Vidalis, Rita Abatzi, Anestis Delias and others) fled to Greece, contributing to the development of the rebetiko style music in Greece.

=== 1922–1932 ===
In the wake of the Asia Minor Catastrophe and the population exchange of 1923, huge numbers of refugees settled in Piraeus, Thessaloniki, Volos and other harbor cities. They brought with them both European and Anatolian musical instruments and musical elements, including Ottoman café music, and, often neglected in accounts of this music, a somewhat Italianate style with mandolins and choral singing in parallel thirds and sixths.

Many of these Greek musicians from Asia Minor were highly competent musicians. Initially, an "Athenian Estudiantina" was established with Giorgos Vidalis and some musicians of the old Smyrneiki Estudiantina. Other musicians became studio directors (A&R men) for the major companies, for example Spyros Peristeris (who played mandolin, guitar, piano and later bouzouki), Panagiotis Toundas (primarily a mandolinist) and the violin virtuoso Giannis Dragatsis (Oghdhondakis). The musical personalities of Peristeris and Toundas in particular came to have enormous influence on the further development of recorded rebetiko. While from the middle of the 1920s a substantial number of Anatolian-style songs were recorded in Greece, examples of Piraeus-style rebetiko song first reached shellac in 1931 (see above).

=== 1930s ===
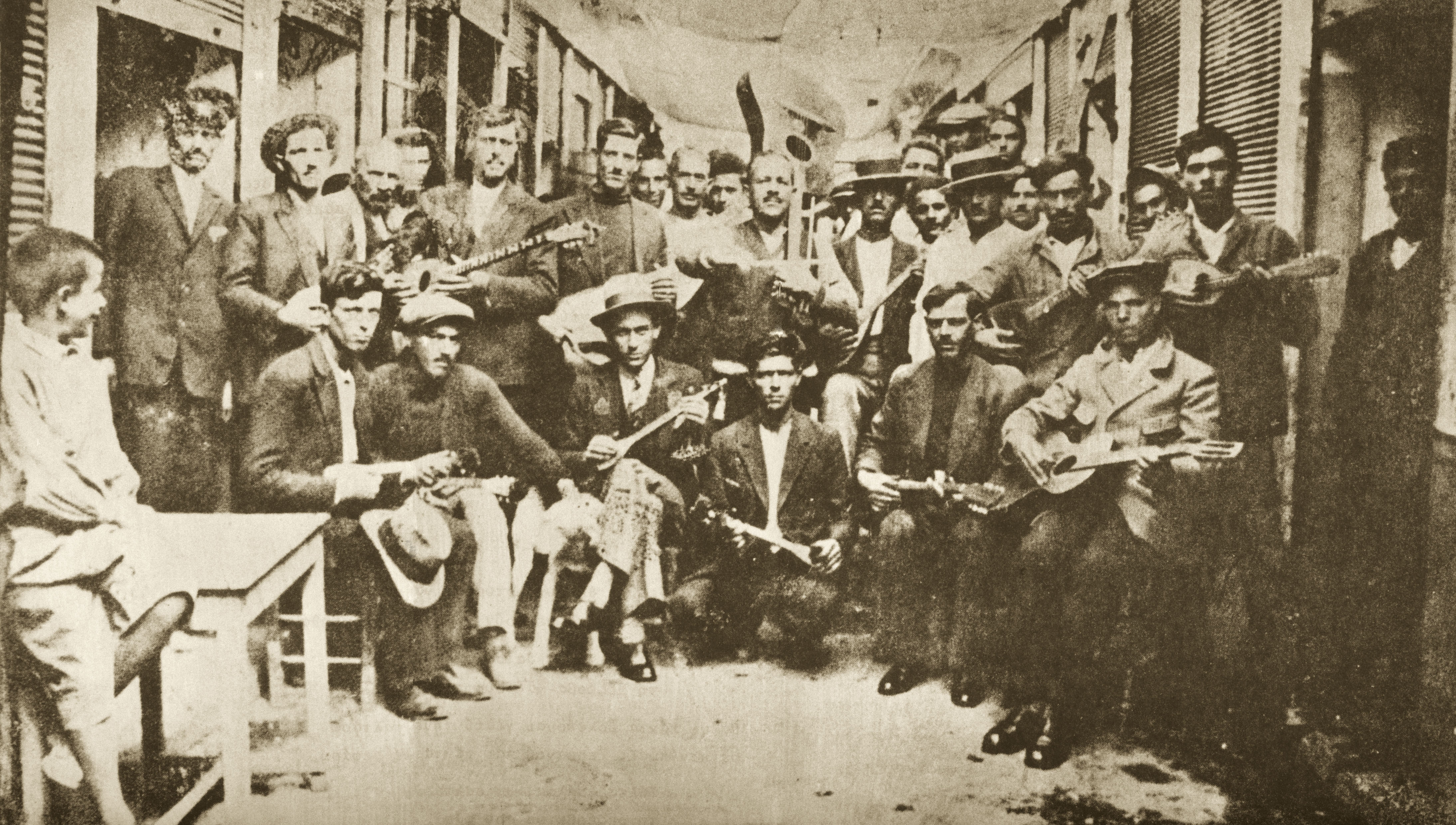
Rebetes in Karaiskaki, Piraeus (1933). Left Vamvakaris with bouzouki, middle Batis with guitar.

During the 1930s, the relatively sophisticated musical styles met with, and cross-fertilised, with the more heavy-hitting local urban styles exemplified by the earliest recordings of Markos Vamvakaris and Batis. (Note: 3rd ed. 1983, pp. 24–27.)

This historical process has led to a terminology intended to distinguish between the clearly Asia Minor oriental style, often called "Smyrneïka", and the bouzouki-based style of the 1930s, often called Piraeus style. (Note: The term "Smyrneïka" is slightly misleading, as it is used to refer to the urban Ottoman-Greek café music styles not only of Smyrna but of Constantinople/Istanbul and other cities, and even to American recordings by artists with no connection to Smyrna.) Also, the use of mandolin totally vanished.

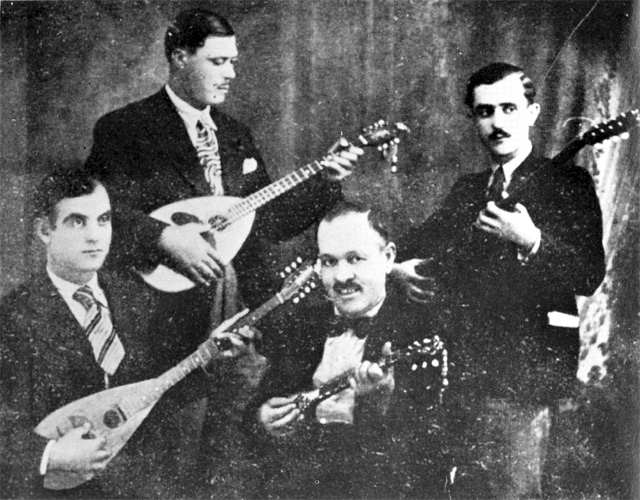
Piraeus Quartet from right: Anestis Delias (aka Artemis), Yiorgos Batis, Markos Vamvakaris, Stratos Pagioumtzis (mid-1930)

By the end of the 1930s rebetiko had reached what can reasonably be called its classic phase, in which elements of the early Piraeus style, elements of the Asia Minor style, clearly European and Greek folk music elements, had fused to generate a genuinely syncretic musical form. Simultaneously, with the onset of censorship, a process began in which rebetiko lyrics slowly began to lose their defining underworld character. This process extended over more than a decade.

=== Metaxas censorship, new directions ===
In 1936, the 4th of August Regime under Ioannis Metaxas was established and with it, the onset of censorship from 1937 onwards. Some of the subject matter of rebetiko songs was then considered disreputable and unacceptable. During this period, when the Metaxas dictatorship subjected all song lyrics to censorship, composers would rewrite lyrics or practice self-censorship before submitting lyrics for approval. The music itself was not censored, although proclamations were made recommending the "Europeanisation" of the outcoming Anatolian music, which led to certain radio stations banning amanedes in 1938, i.e. on the basis of music rather than lyrics. This was, however, not bouzouki music. The term amanedes, (sing. amanes, Gr. αμανέδες, sing. αμανές) refers to a kind of improvised lament, in ummeasured time, sung in a particular dromos/makam. The amanedes were perhaps the most pointedly oriental songs in the Greek repertoire of the time. (Note: Stathis Damianakos has argued that the rebetiko songs of this first period were mostly the musical expression of the lumpenproletariat.)

Metaxas also closed all the tekedes (hashish dens) in the country. References to drugs and other criminal or disreputable activities vanished from recordings made in Greek studios, to reappear briefly in the first recordings made at the resumption of recording activity in 1946. In the United States, however, Greek musical production flourished, with song lyrics apparently unaffected by censorship, (see below) although, strangely, the bouzouki continued to be rare on American recordings until after WWII.

It is notable that Rebetiko music was also rejected by the Greek Left because of its "reactionary" (according to the Communist Party of Greece) and subculture character, and its drug references.

=== Postwar period ===
Recording activities ceased during the Axis occupation of Greece during World War II (1941–1944), and did not resume until 1946; that year, during a very short period, a handful of uncensored songs with drug references were recorded, several in multiple versions with different singers.

The scene was soon popularized further by stars like Vassilis Tsitsanis. His musical career had started in 1936 and continued during the war despite the occupation. A musical genius, he was both a brilliant bouzouki player and a prolific composer, with hundreds of songs to his credit. After the war, he continued to develop his style in new directions, and under his wing, singers such as Sotiria Bellou, Ioanna Georgakopoulou, Stella Haskil and Marika Ninou made their appearance. Tsitsanis developed the "Westernization" of the rebetiko and made it known to larger sections of the population, setting also the bases for the future laiko.

In 1948, Manos Hatzidakis shook the musical establishment by delivering his legendary lecture on rebetiko, until then with heavy underworld and cannabis use connections and consequently looked down upon. Hatzidakis focused on the economy of expression, the deep traditional roots and the genuine emotion displayed in rembetika, and exalted the likes of composers like Markos Vamvakaris and Vassilis Tsitsanis. Putting theory into practice, he adapted classic rembetika in his 1951 piano work, Six Folk Paintings (Έξι Λαϊκές Ζωγραφιές), which was later also presented as a folk ballet.

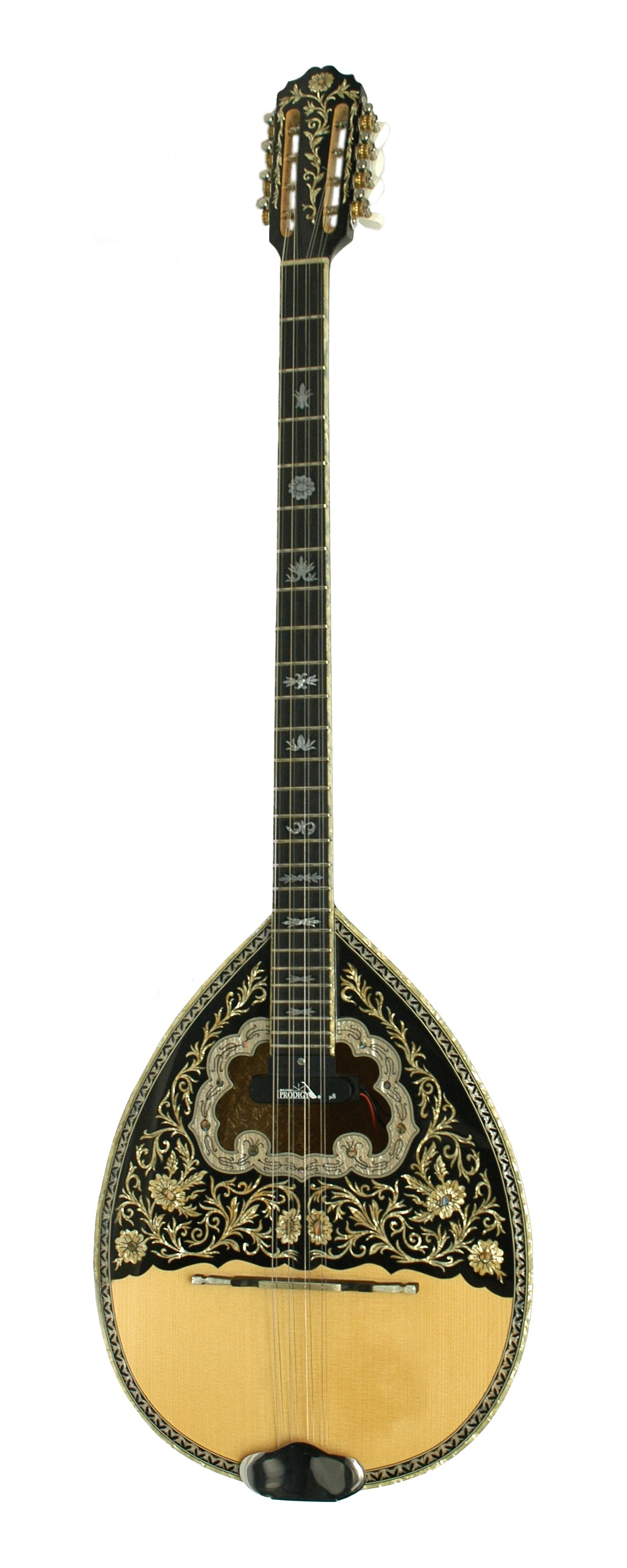
A modern four-course bouzouki

Parallel to the post-war career of Tsitsanis, the career of Manolis Chiotis took rebetiko and Greek popular music in more radically new directions. Chiotis developed much more the "Europeanisation/Westernization" of the rebetiko. In 1953, he added a fourth pair of strings to the bouzouki, which allowed it to be played as a guitar and set the stage for the future 'electrification' of rebetiko.

Chiotis icorpotated Latin American and other international music influences, including flamenco, rumba, mambo in his work. His compositions also tended to favor a lighter style than the traditionally associated with rebetiko. In 1956 he introduced and poplarized the four-course bouzouki (tetrahordho), a modified version fo the instrument. Already an accomplished perfomer on the traditional three-course bouzouki, Chiotis developed new playing techniques based on the guitar-like of the four-course instrument. These innovations had a significant influence on the development of laïki mousiki (laiko) and other styles of bouzouki performance, distinguishing them from earlier forms of rebetiko.

A comparable development also took place on the vocal side. In 1952, a young singer named Stelios Kazantzidis recorded a couple of rebetika songs that were quite successful. Although he would continue in the same style for a few years, it was quickly realized, by all parties involved, that his singing technique and expressive abilities were too good to be restricted to rebetiko. Soon, well-known composers of rebetika—like Kaldaras, Chiotis, Klouvatos—began to write songs tailored to Stelios' powerful voice and this created a further shift in rebetika music. The new songs had a more complex melodic structure and were usually more dramatic in character. Kazantzidis went on to become a star of the emerging laiki music.

Kazantzidis, however, not only contributed to the demise of classical rebetika of the Piraeus style. Paradoxically, he was also one of the forerunners of its revival. In 1956 he started his cooperation with Vassilis Tsitsanis, who, in addition to writing new songs for Kazantzidis, also gave him some of his old ones to reinterpret. Kazantzidis, thus, sung and popularized such rebetika classics as "Synnefiasmeni Kyriaki" (Clouded Sunday), "Bakse tsifliki" and "Ta Kavourakia". These songs, and many others, previously unknown to the wider public, suddenly became cherished and sought after.

At about the same time, many of the old-time performers—both singers and bouzouki players—abandoned the musical scene of Greece. Some of them died prematurely (Haskil, Ninou), others emigrated to the US (Binis, Evgenikos, Tzouanakos, Kaplanis), while some quit music life for other work (Pagioumtzis, Genitsaris). This, of course, created a void that had to be filled with new blood. In the beginning, the new recruits—like, for example, Dalia, Grey and Kazantzidis—stayed within the bounds of classical rebetica. Soon, however, their youthful enthusiasm and different experiences found expression in new stylistic venues which eventually changed the old idiom.

This combined situation contributed, during the 1950s, to the almost total eclipse of rebetiko by other popular styles. By the late 1950s, rebetiko had declined; it only survived in the form of archontorebetiko (αρχοντορεμπέτικο, 'posh rebetiko' or 'bourgeois rebetiko'), a refined style of rebetiko that was far more accepted by the upper class than the traditional form of the genre.

Somewhat confusingly, from at least the 1950s, during which rebetiko songs were not usually referred to as a separate musical category, but more specifically on the basis of lyrics, the term laïki mousiki (λαϊκή μουσική), or laïka, (λαϊκα) covered a broad range of Greek popular music, including songs with the bouzouki, and songs that later would without doubt be classified as rebetiko. The term in its turn derives from the word laos (λάος), which translates best as 'the people'.

=== The revival ===
The first phase of the rebetiko revival can perhaps be said to have begun around 1960. In that year, the singer Grigoris Bithikotsis recorded a number of songs by Markos Vamvakaris, and Vamvakaris himself made his first recording since 1954. During the same period, writers such as Elias Petropoulos began researching and publishing their earliest attempts to consider rebetiko as a subject in itself. The bouzouki, unquestioned as the basic musical instrument of rebetiko music, then began to make inroads into other areas of Greek music, not least due to the virtuosity of Manolis Chiotis. From 1960 onwards prominent Greek composers such as Mikis Theodorakis and Manos Hatzidakis employed bouzouki virtuosi such as Manolis Chiotis, Giorgos Zambetas, and Thanassis Polyhandriotis in their recordings.

The next phase of the rebetiko revival can be said to have started in the beginning of the 1970s, when LP reissues of 78 rpm recordings, both anthologies and records devoted to individual artists, began to appear in larger numbers. This phase of the revival was initially, and is still to a large extent, characterized by a desire to recapture the style of the original recordings, whereas the first phase tended to present old songs in the current musical idiom of Greek popular music, laïki mousiki. Many singers emerged and became popular during this period. It was during the 1970s that the first work which aimed to popularize rebetiko outside the Greek language sphere appeared (Note: 1st ed. 1975.) and the first English-language academic work was completed.

During the 1970s, a number of older artists made new recordings of the older repertoire, accompanied by bouzouki players of a younger generation. Giorgios Mouflouzelis, for example, recorded a number of LPs, though he had never recorded during his youth in the 78 rpm era. The most significant contribution in this respect was perhaps a series of LPs recorded by the singer Sotiria Bellou, who had had a fairly successful career from 1947 onwards, initially under the wing of Tsitsanis. These newer recordings were instrumental in bringing rebetiko to the ears of many who were unfamiliar with the recordings of the 78 rpm era, and are still available as CDs.

An important aspect of the revival of the late 1960s and early 1970s was the element of protest, resistance and revolt against the military dictatorship of the junta years. This was perhaps because rebetiko lyrics, although seldom directly political, were easily construed as subversive by the nature of their subject matter and their association in popular memory with previous periods of conflict.

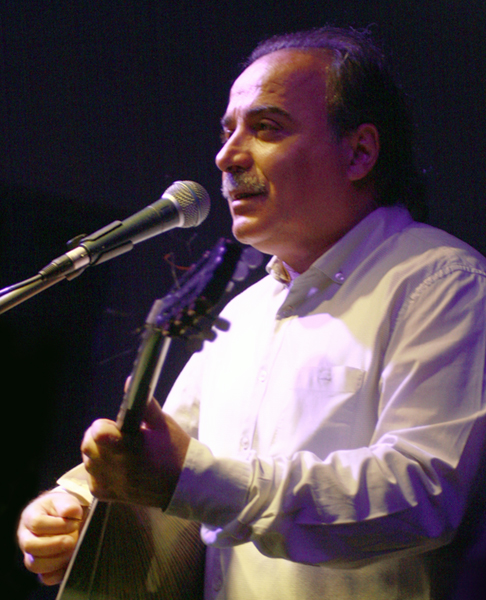
Babis Tsertos

Rebetiko in its original form was revived during the Junta of 1967–1974, when the Regime of the Colonels banned it. After the end of the Junta, many revival groups (and solo artists) appeared. The most notable of them include Opisthodhromiki Kompania, Rembetiki Kompania, Babis Tsertos, Agathonas Iakovidis and others.

Giorgos Dalaras in 1975 decided to release his own renditions of rebetiko songs on the double LP 50 Chronia Rebetiko Tragoudi (50 Χρόνια Ρεμπέτικο Τραγούδι, 50 Years of Rebetiko Songs). The recording proved an immediate success, despite the toning down of the lyrics. However, as a result, a new movement was set to take place in Greek music, and the once forgotten rebetes were finding themselves performing, in some cases for the first time in 30 to 40 years. He followed up this work with an LP in 1980, Rebetika tis Katochis (Ρεμπέτικα της Κατοχής, Rebetiko (songs) of the occupation), which was a more gritty and meaty release, more faithful to the tone of the original rebetika as heard in the 1930s. However, references to drugs were again cut out and only mentioned in passing. Unlike the previous double LP, this one contained some of the original musicians, Bayianteras and Genitsaris in particular, making an appearance on the album.

=== Modern times ===
Rebetiko songs are still popular in Greece, both in contemporary interpretations which make no attempt to be other than contemporary in style and in interpretations aspiring to emulate the old styles. The genre is a subject of growing international research, and its popularity outside Greece is well-established.

Some of the musicians and singers of the genre include Babis Tsertos, Babis Goles and Agathonas Iakovidis.

In 2012, Vinicio Capossela released his music album Rebetiko Gymnastas.

== In the United States ==
Greek emigration to the United States started in earnest towards the end of the 19th century. From then, and in the years following the Asia Minor Disaster, until immigration became restricted in the mid-1920s, a great number of Greeks emigrated to the United States, bringing their musical traditions. American companies began recording Greek music performed by these immigrants as early as 1896. (Note: The Berliner company recorded eight songs sung by Michael Arachtingi in May 1896 (see Richard K. Spottswood).) The first Greek-American recording enterprises made their appearance in 1919. From the closing years of the second decade of the century there exist a number of recordings that can be considered as rebetiko, a few years before such songs began to appear on recordings in Greece.

The music industry in the United States played a role from the mid-1930s onwards in recording rebetiko lyrics which would not have passed the censors in Greece. This phenomenon came to repeat itself during the Greek military junta of 1967–1974. An example of American recording studios permitting some 'bolder' lyrics can be found in the LP Otan Kapnizi O Loulas (Όταν Καπνίζει Ο Λουλάς, When They Smoke The Hookah) by Apostolos Nikolaidis, released in 1973. Releasing this album in Greece, with its overt references to drug use, would have been impossible at that time. It is worth noting, however, that the censorship laws invoked in Greece by Metaxas were not officially revoked until 1981, seven years after the fall of the junta. Another characteristic of American Greek recordings of the time was the recording of songs in the Anatolian musical styles of rebetiko, which continued in the United States well into the 1950s. Even songs originally recorded with typical bouzouki-baglamas-guitar accompaniment could appear in Anatolian garments.

After WWII, beginning in the early 1950s, many Greek rebetiko musicians and singers traveled from Greece to tour the United States, and some stayed for longer periods. Prominent among them were Ioannis Papaioannou, Manolis Chiotis, Vassilis Tsitsanis, Iordanis Tsomidis, Roza Eskenazi, Stratos Pagioumtzis, Stavros Tzouanakos and Giannis Tatasopoulos, of whom the latter three died in the United States.

== Rebetiko rock ==
Rebetiko rock
- Stylistic origins: Rock; rebetiko; Greek folk; hard rock
- Cultural origins: 1970s, Greece
- Typical instruments: Tambouras; bouzouki; toubeleki; oud

Rebetiko rock is a music genre that fuses the elements of rock music and rebetiko. Hard rock and the Greek folk music are also a major influence on rebetiko rock.

== Performers of rebetiko on 78 rpm recordings ==
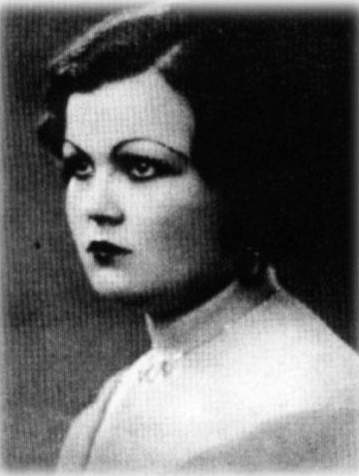
Rita Abatzi

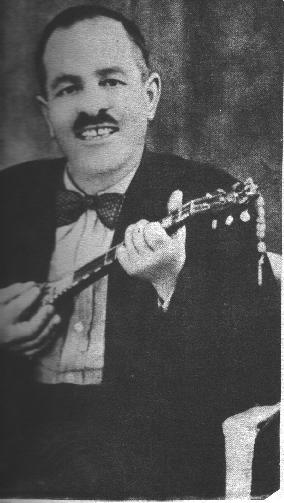
Yiorgos Batis

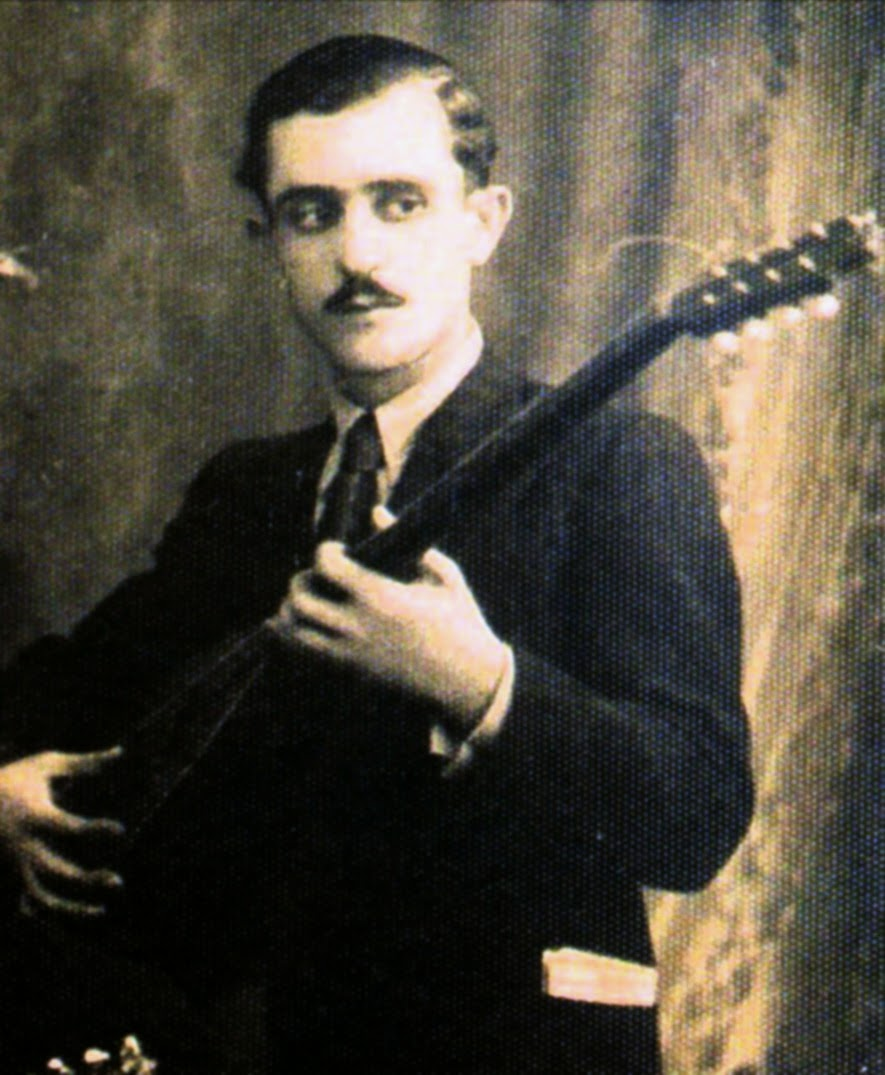
Anestis Delias

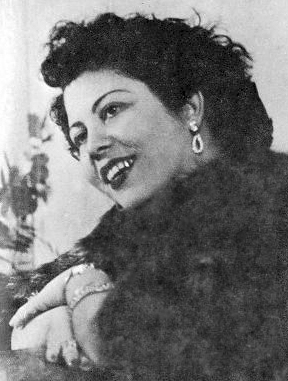
Marika Ninou

Kostas Roukounas

== Selected recordings ==
- Margarita (Rita Abatzi, 1936) – Instruments: guitar, bouzouki, baglamas)
- Neo Hasapaki (Roza Eskenazi, 1932) – Instruments: bouzouki, guitar, accordion, oud, percussion, violin)
- Tha Se Klepso (Kostas Roukounas, 1934) – Instruments: guitar, violin, bouzouki, Politiki lyra, oud, percussion)

== Discography ==
Much rebetiko is issued in Greece on CDs, which quickly go out of print. Since the 1990s a considerable number of high quality CD productions of historical rebetiko have been released by various European and American labels. The following select discography includes some of these historical anthologies, which are likely to be available in English speaking countries, plus a few Greek issues. All are CDs unless otherwise noted. The emphasis on English-language releases in this discography is motivated both by their consistently high sound quality and by their inclusion, in many cases, of copious information in English, which tends to be lacking in Greek issues. See however link section below for one Greek source of historic CDs with website and notes in English.

- Apostolos Hadzichristos – A Unique Greek Voice, (4CD), JSP Records, 2011.
- From Tambouras to Bouzouki The History and Evolution of the Bouzouki and its First Recordings (1926–1932), Orpheum Phonograph ORPH-01 ISBN 978-618-80538-0-9, 2013.
- Great Voices of Constantinople 1927–1933, Rounder Records, 1997.
- Greek-Oriental Rebetica-Songs & Dances in the Asia Minor Style:The Golden Years, Arhoolie Records, 1991.
- Greek Rhapsody – Instrumental Music from Greece 1905–1956, (2CD & book) Dust-To-Digital DTD-27, 2013.
- Marika Papagika – Greek Popular and Rebetic Music in New York 1918–1929, Alma Criolla Records, 1994.
- Markos Vamvakaris, Bouzouki Pioneer, 1932–1940, Rounder Records, 1998.
- Markos Vamvakaris, Master of Rembetika – Complete Recordings 1932–1937, plus selected recordings 1938, (4CD), JSP Records, 2010
- Mortika – Rare Vintage Recordings from a Greek Underworld, ARKO records, Uppsala, 2005. CD and book, also issued as 2LP box by Mississippi Records, 2009.
- Mourmourika: Songs of the Greek Underworld, Rounder Records, 1999.
- My Only Consolation: Classic Pireotic Rembetica 1932–1946, Rounder Records, 1999.
- Rembetica: Historic Urban Folk Songs From Greece, Rounder Records, 1992.
- Rembetika: Greek Music from the Underground, JSP Records, 2006.
- Rembetika 2: More of the Secret History of Greece's Underground Music, JSP Records, 2008.
- Rebetiki Istoria, EMIAL-Lambropoulos, Athens 1975–76 – LP series in six volumes, later also issued on cassettes and CDs.
- Roza Eskenazi – Rembetissa, Rounder Records, 1996.
- The Rough Guide to Rebetika, World Music Network, 2004.
- Vassilis Tsitsanis – All the pre-war recordings, 1936–1940 (5CD), JSP Records, 2008.
- Vassilis Tsitsanis – The Postwar Years 1946–1954, (4CD), JSP Records, 2009.
- Women of Rembetica, Rounder Records, 2000.
- Women of Rembetika, (4CD), JSP Records, 2012.
- Various – The Diaspora Of Rembetiko, Network Medien, (2CD), compilation, 2004

== See also ==
- Byzantine music
- Hasapiko
- Mangas
- Rembetiko – a film by Costas Ferris
- Syrtaki – fast version of Hasapiko
