= Bouzouki =

Greek plucked stringed instrument

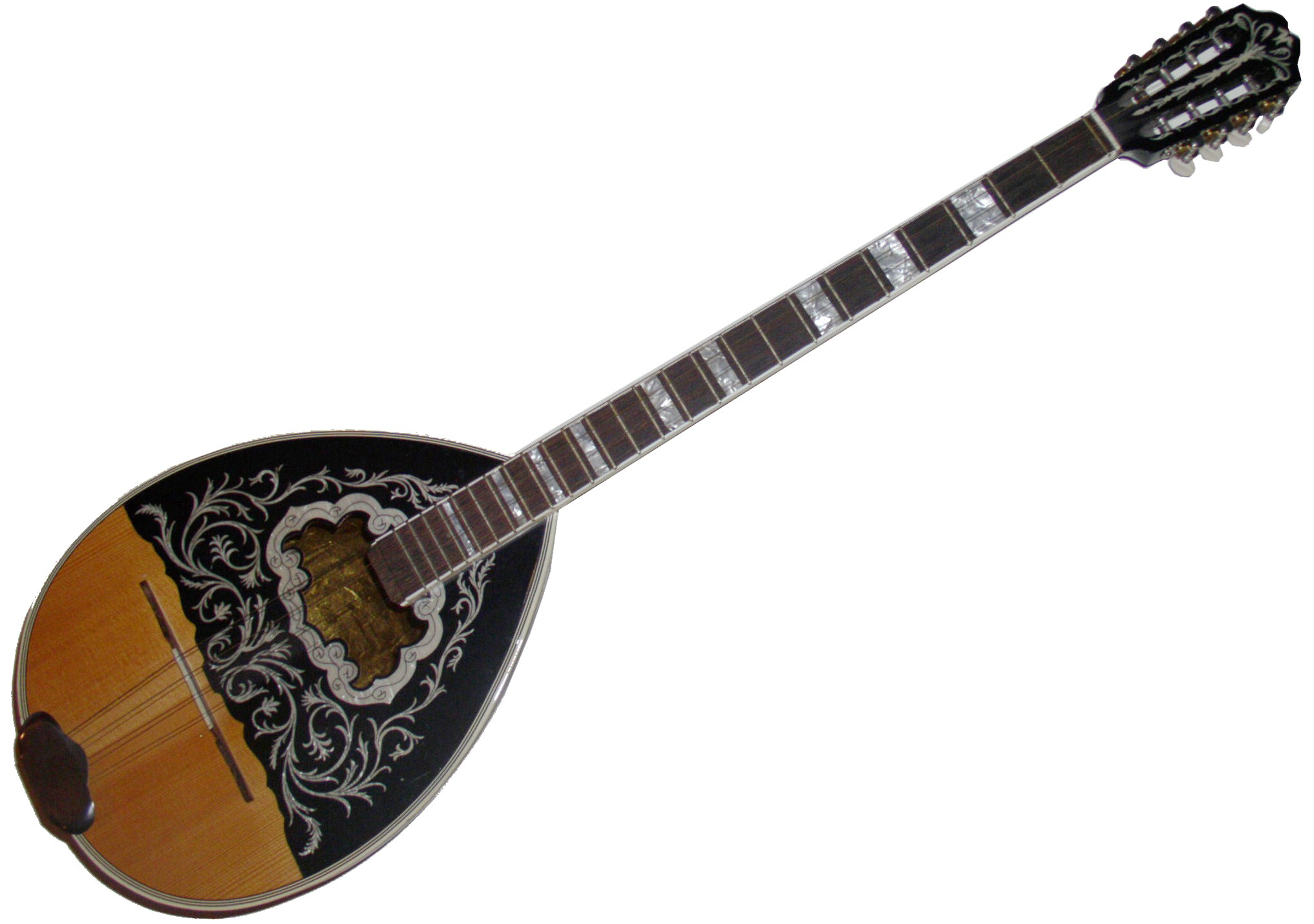
- Other names: Buzuki, trichordo, tetrachordo
- Classification: Plucked string instrument: Necked bowl lutes; String instruments
- Hornbostel–Sachs classification: 321.321 (string instrument with a pear-shaped body and a long neck, played with plectrum)

Playing range
- C3 – E6 (tetrachordo), D3 – E6 (trichordo)

Related instruments
- Balkan tambura; Tzouras; Tambouras; Buzuq; Baglamas; Bağlama (saz); Pandura

The bouzouki (/buːˈzuːki, bʊˈ-/, also US: /bəˈ-/; Greek: μπουζούκι [buˈzuki]; plural. bouzoukis or bouzoukia, μπουζούκια) is a musical instrument popular in Greece.

It is a member of the long-necked lute family, with a round body and a long neck with a fretted fingerboard. It has steel strings and is played with a plectrum, producing a sharp metallic sound, reminiscent of a mandolin but pitched lower. It is the precursor to the Irish bouzouki, an instrument derived from the Greek bouzouki that is popular in Celtic, English, and North American folk music. Instruments similar to the bouzouki (like buzuq and Balkan tambura) are also common in West Asia (Syria, Iraq, Lebanon, Cyprus), Balkans and Turkey.

The instrument was brought to Greece in the early 1900s by Greek refugees from Anatolia, and quickly became the central instrument to the rebetiko genre and its music branches. It is now an important element of modern Laïko pop Greek music.

== Etymology ==
The name bouzouki comes from the Turkish word bozuk, meaning "broken" or "modified", and comes from a particular re-entrant tuning called bozuk düzen, which was commonly used on its Turkish counterpart, the saz-bozuk. It is in the same instrumental family as the mandolin and the lute.

Originally the body was carved from a solid block of wood, similar to the saz, but upon its arrival in Greece in the early 1910s it was modified by the addition of a staved back borrowed from the Neapolitan mandola, and the top angled in the manner of a Neapolitan mandolins so as to increase the strength of the body to withstand thicker steel strings. The type of the instrument used in rebetiko music was a three-course instrument with three pairs of strings, but in the 1950s a four-course variety was developed and was made popular by Manolis Chiotis.

== Construction ==
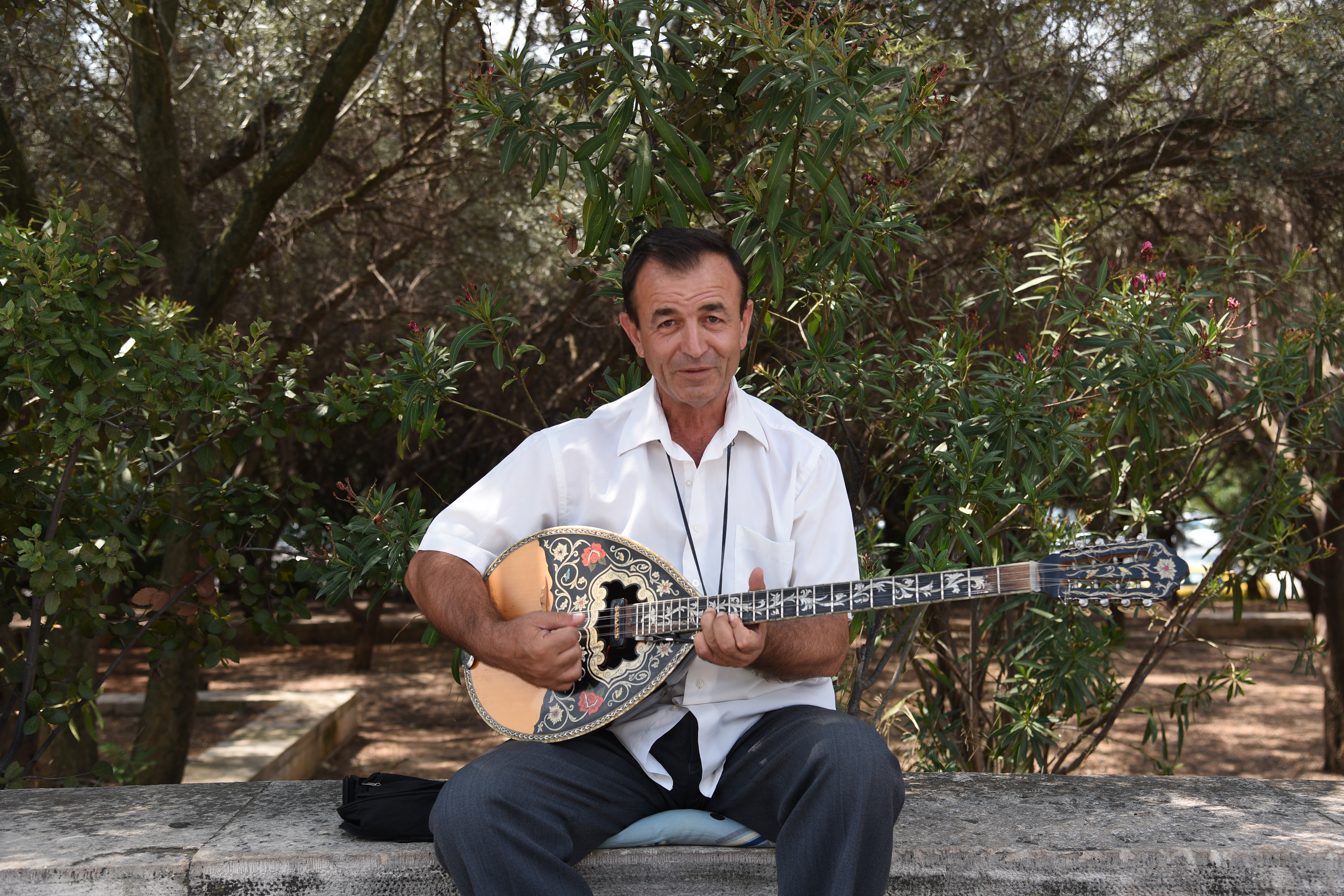
Bouzouki player in Athens, July 2018

From a construction point of view, the bouzouki can have differences not only in the number of strings but also in other features, e.g. neck length, width, height, depth of the bowl or main body, the width of the staves (the wooden gores or slices of the bowl) etc. These differences are determined by the manufacturer, who in his experience and according to the sound that the instrument should make, modifies his functional elements to achieve a more piercing, deeper or heavier sound.

The size and type of the resonating body largely determine the instrument's timbre, while the length of the neck, and by extension the strings, determines the instrument's pitch range, as well as influencing the timbre. While neck length can vary from instrument to instrument, most bouzoukis have the same number of frets (27), spaced such as to provide a chromatic scale in 12-tone equal temperament. On modern instruments the frets are metal, and set into a fixed position in the fingerboard (in contrast to early instruments and the related baglama, in which frets were of gut or cord tied onto the neck, and moveable.) The quality of the wood from which the instrument is made is of great importance to the sound. For the construction of the bowl, mulberry, apricot, cherry, acacia, and elm are considered to be the best woods, with walnut, plane, and chestnut being slightly inferior. The wood must be solid and sourced from slow-growth trees. The top or soundboard should be cedar or spruce (preferably spruce) if possible, cut in one piece. The top plays a major role in the sound because it resonates and strengthens and prolongs the vibration of the strings. Another factor that affects the quality of the sound is the varnish and the method of its application. The best varnish is a natural one made of shellac, which is applied by hand in many layers in the traditional way, for both acoustic and visual effects. The neck must be of very dry hardwood in order not to warp and increase the distance of the strings from the fretboard (the action height), which makes playing the instrument more laborious. Manufacturers use different techniques to achieve this, each one having its own secrets. Many modern instruments have a metal rod or bar (truss-rod) set into a channel in the neck, under the fingerboard, which adds some weight but increases rigidity, and allows adjustment of the neck should it begin to warp.

== History ==
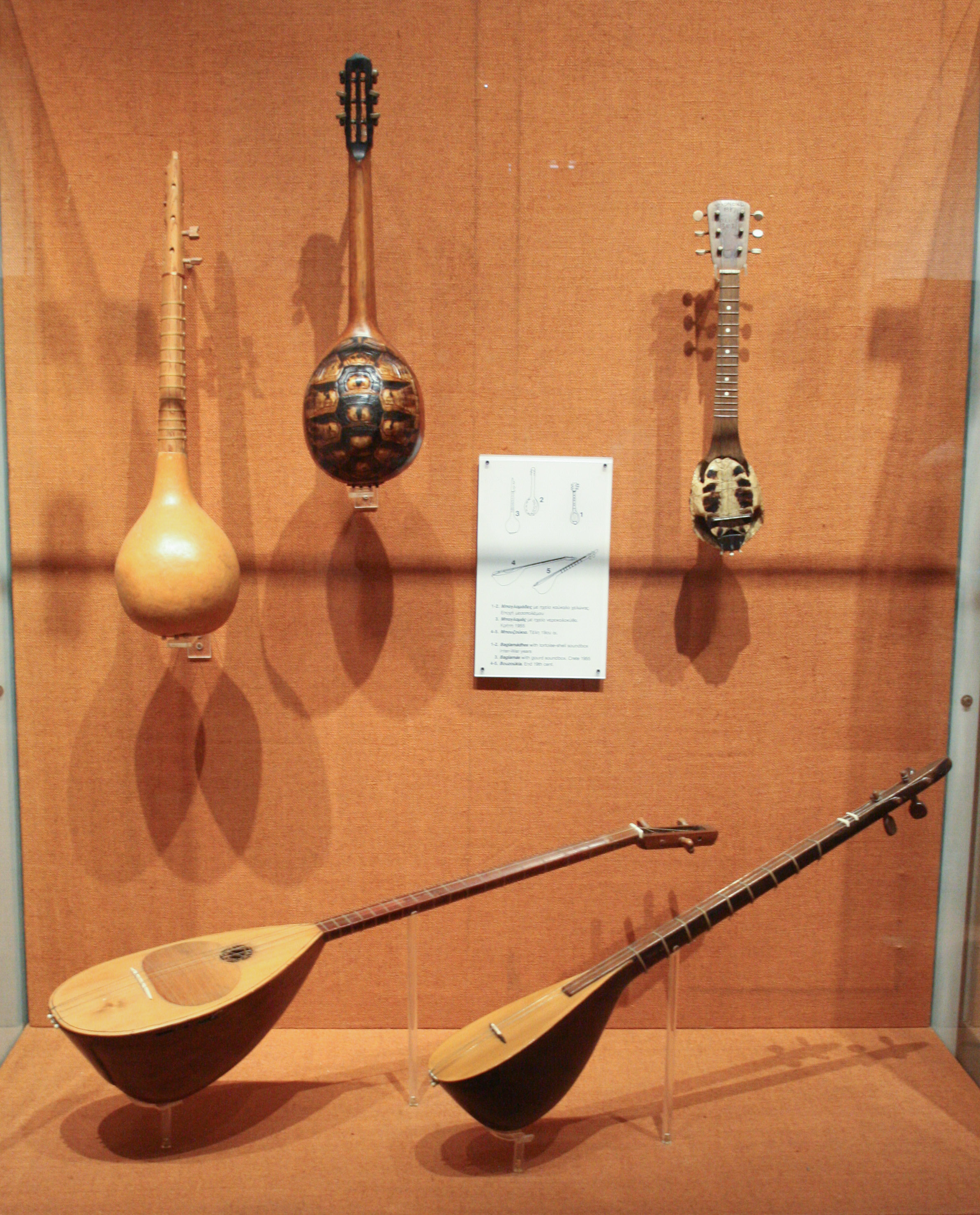
Bouzouki in the Museum of Greek Folk Musical Instruments in Athens

The Greek bouzouki is a plucked musical instrument of the lute family, called the thabouras or tambouras family. The tambouras existed in ancient Greece as the pandura, and can be found in various sizes, shapes, depths of body, lengths of neck and number of strings. The bouzouki and the baglamas are the direct descendants. The Greek marble relief, known as the Mantineia Base (now exhibited at the National Archaeological Museum of Athens), dating from 330–320 BC, shows a muse playing a variant of the pandoura.

From Byzantine times it was called first pandoura and then tambouras. On display in the National Historical Museum of Greece is the tambouras of a hero of the Greek revolution of 1821, General Makriyiannis.

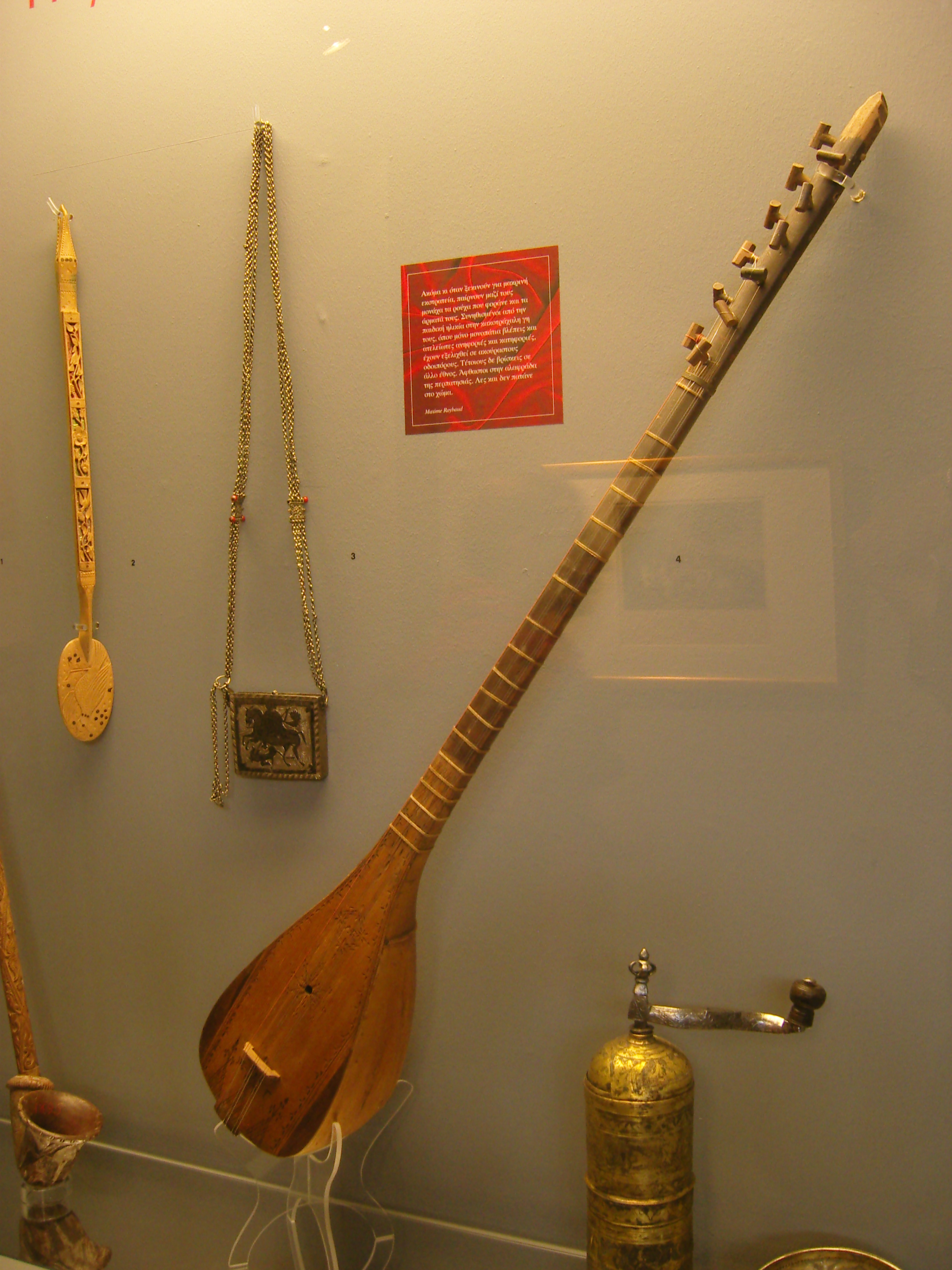
The tambouras of Yannis Makriyannis in the National Historical Museum, Athens

Other sizes have appeared and include the Greek instrument tzouras, an instrument smaller in size than standard bouzoukia.

The bouzouki arrived in Greece following the 1919–1922 war in Asia Minor and the subsequent population exchange between Greece and Turkey. The early bouzoukia mostly had three courses (six strings in three pairs, known as trichordo) and were tuned in different ways, according to the scale one wanted to play. At the end of the 1950s, four-course (tetrachordo) bouzoukia started to gain popularity. The four-course bouzouki was made popular by Manolis Chiotis, who also used a tuning akin to standard guitar tuning, which made it easier for guitarists to play bouzouki; this angered purists, but allowed for greater virtuosity and helped elevate the bouzouki into a truly popular instrument capable of a wide range of musical expression. Recently the three-course bouzouki has gained in popularity. The first recording with the four-course instrument was made in 1956.

The Irish bouzouki, with four courses, a flatter back, and differently tuned from the Greek bouzouki, is a more recent development, stemming from the introduction of the Greek instrument into Irish music by Johnny Moynihan around 1965. It was subsequently adopted by Andy Irvine, Dónal Lunny, and many others, although some Irish musicians, such as the late Alec Finn, continued to use the Greek-style instruments.

== Three-course bouzouki (trichordo) ==
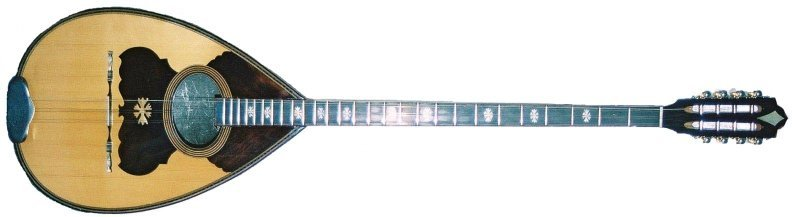
Greek trichordo bouzouki

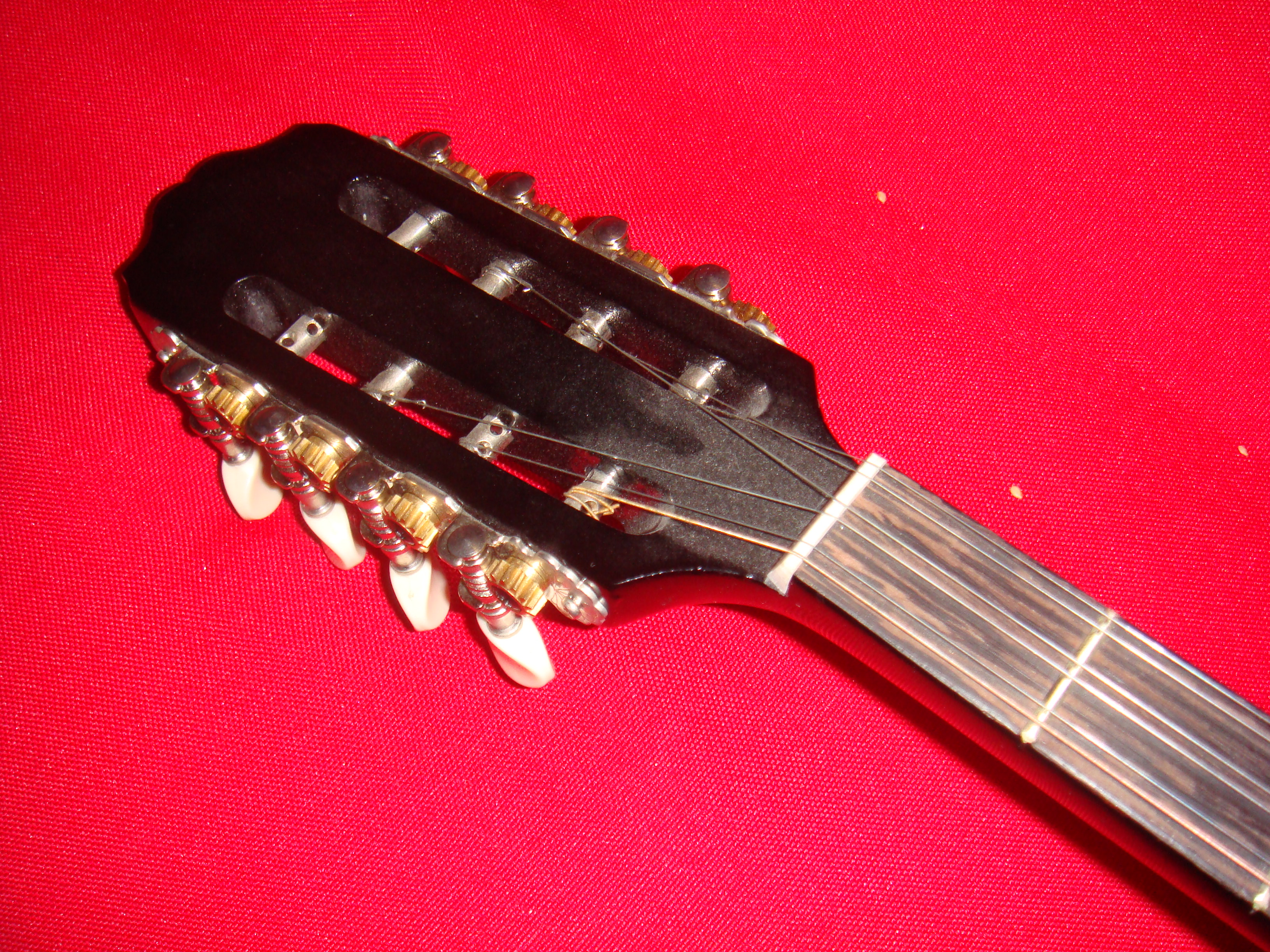
A close up of the headstock of a trichordo bouzouki. Two of these eight tuners are not strung.

This is the classic style of bouzouki, introduced around 1900, that was the mainstay of most rebetiko music. It has fixed frets and 6 strings in three pairs. In the lower-pitched (bass) course, the pair consists of a thick wound string and a thin string, tuned an octave apart. The conventional modern tuning of the trichordo bouzouki is D_{4}D_{3}–A_{3}A_{3}–D_{4}D_{4}. This tuning was called the "European tuning" by Markos Vamvakaris, who mentioned several other tunings, or douzenia" (some of which he used in pieces), in his autobiography. Examples of said douzenia include the isio/tis psihis (straight/of the soul; D_{3}D_{4}–G_{3}G_{3}–D_{4}D_{4}), the karadouzeni A_{2}A_{3}–G_{3}G_{3}–D_{4}D_{4} and others. The illustrated bouzouki was made by Karolos Tsakirian of Athens, and is a replica of a trichordo bouzouki made by his grandfather for Markos Vamvakaris. The absence of the heavy mother-of-pearl ornamentation often seen on modern bouzoukia is typical of bouzoukia of the period. It has tuners for eight strings, but has only six strings, the neck being too narrow for eight. The luthiers of the time often used sets of four tuners on trichordo instruments, as these were more easily available, and were also used on mandolins.

== Four-course bouzouki (tetrachordo) ==
This type of bouzouki has 8 metal strings, which are arranged in 4 pairs, known as courses, typically tuned C_{3}C_{4}–F_{3}F_{4}–A_{3}A_{3}–D_{4}D_{4} (i.e., one whole step below the four high strings of a guitar). In the two higher-pitched (treble) courses, the two strings of the pair are tuned to the same note. In the two lower-pitched (bass) courses, the pair consists of a thick wound string and a thin string tuned an octave apart. On the bouzouki, the lower-pitched string comes first in these courses, the reverse of most other instruments with octave-paired courses (such as the 12-string guitar, charango or bajo sexto). These 'octave strings' add to the fullness of the sound and are used in chords and bass drones (continuous low notes that are played throughout the music). The guitar-like tuning was introduced by composer and soloist Manolis Hiotis, who found it better suited to the kind of virtuoso playing he was famous for. Today, the tetrachordo is the most common bouzouki used in Greek music, though a few traditionalists still prefer the trichordo, particularly for the older rebetiko style of playing.

== Five-course bouzouki (pentachordo) ==
This bouzouki has 10 strings arranged in 5 pairs, adding on an Octave G Course tuned G_{2}G_{3} in addition to the other 8 strings to extend the range so the tuning is G_{2}G_{3}-C_{3}C_{4}–F_{3}F_{4}–A_{3}A_{3}–D_{4}D_{4} (a whole step below the 5 high strings of a guitar) which allows for extended Chords & versatility, & was popularized by Antonopoulos Giorgos.

== Amplification ==
In addition to developing the modern tetrachordo bouzouki, Manolis Hiotis was a pioneer of the use of amplification for the instrument, which he may have been using as early as 1945. However, the earliest documented use of amplification for the bouzouki comes from a 1952 photograph, showing Vasilis Tsitsanis and Yiannis Papaioannou playing bouzoukis, each with an electric guitar-style pick-up attached in the soundhole. There are also numerous photographs between 1953 and 1959 showing bands in which both vocalists and bouzouki players are using microphones for amplification. By 1960, special bouzouki pickups (such as the German "Ideal") were being produced and permanently mounted in the instruments. Similar pickups are widely used by several Greek artists today and come in active and passive versions.

== Related instruments ==
The Greek baglamas (Greek: μπαγλαμάς) or baglamadaki (Greek: μπαγλαμαδάκι) is very different from the Turkish bağlama. It is tuned the same as the trichordo bouzouki but pitched an octave higher (nominally D–A–D), with unison pairs on the four highest strings and an octave pair on the lower D. Musically, the baglamas is most often found supporting the bouzouki in the Piraeus style of rebetiko.

- Tzouras
- Irish bouzouki
- Balkan tambura
- Lute
- Mandolin
- Pandura
- Bağlama
- Šargija

== Notable players ==
- Angelo Avramakis
- Manolis Chiotis
- Anestis Delias
- Alec Finn
- Dimitris Gogos
- Apostolos Kaldaras
- Charis Lemonopoulos
- Colin Meloy
- Giannis Papaioannou
- Spyros Peristeris
- Giannis Tatasopoulos
- Babis Tsertos
- Vassilis Tsitsanis
- Markos Vamvakaris
- Nikos Vrachnas
- Giorgos Zambetas
- Phil X
- Frank Zappa
- Mihalis Genitsaris

== See also ==
- Arabic music
- Balalaika
- Balkan music
- Celtic music
- Cittern
- Greek folk music
- Greek music
- Irish folk music
- Laiko
- Laouto, another Greek lute
- Lute
- Mandola
- Mandolin
- Octave mandolin
- Rebetiko
- Stringed instrument tunings
- Syriac sacral music
- Turkish music
- Tzouras
