= Angela Papazoglou =

Smyrniote Greek rebetiko singer

- Αγγέλα Παπάζογλου
- Born: Angela Maronitou; November 8, 1899; Smyrna, Ottoman Empire
- Died: August 17, 1983 (aged 83); Kokkinia, Greece
- Occupation: Singer
- Notable work: Dervísena (Ντερβίσένα), recorded 1934, Galata Manes (Γαλάτα Μανές), Recorded 1934,
- Spouse: Vangelis Papazoglou
- Children: 1

Angela Papazoglou (Greek: Αγγέλα Παπάζογλου; November 8, 1899 – August 17, 1983) was a Greek rebetiko singer from Smyrna, then part of the Ottoman Empire. She is best known for her memoirs, which were published posthumously and adapted into a play.

== Biography ==
Angela Papazoglou was born Angela Maronitou on November 8, 1899, in Smyrna, now called İzmir, to Eleni Maronitou and Dimitris Maronitis. Her father Dimitris was a violinist. She learned to play the santouri and violin at a young age, and by the time she was 11, she appeared onstage with her father. By the time she was 17, Papazoglou was singing at venues across Smyrna with other rebetiko players. To appeal to the diverse audiences of cosmopolitan Smyrna, she sang in Hebrew, Arabic, and Armenian as well as Greek. She learned a variety of Greek musical styles and also different genres from Europe and the Middle East. She went by the stage name Angelitsa while performing.

In 1922, following the Great Fire of Smyrna and the Greek-Turkish population exchange, Papazoglou resettled in Kokkinia, Greece. Music was important to Papazoglou throughout her life. Speaking on her experience as a refugee, she said, "They had taken everything from us; only our songs were left."

In 1924, Angela Papazoglou met Vangelis Papazoglou, a composer of rebetiko music. They married in 1927 and had one son, Giorgis. In 1929, Papazoglou went blind after a period of illness. Papazoglou's husband Vangelis discouraged her from singing. He died in 1943 of tuberculosis.

Angela Papazoglou died on August 17, 1983. She left recordings of seven songs, including six amanedes. After her death, her son Giorgis published her memoirs under the title Dreams of the Unburnt and Burnt Smyrna (Greek: Ονείρατα της άκαυτης και της καμένης Σμύρνης). The book describes her life during major historical events, including the Occupation of Smyrna, the 4th of August Regime, and the World War II. Her memoirs provided the inspiration for the play Angela Papazoglou, a dramatized theatrical account of her life. It was first staged in 1999, with Anna Vagena playing the lead. The play focuses on her experiences as a refugee fleeing Smyrna after the war. As of January 2026, Angela Papazoglou is still performed onstage in Greece.

== Discography ==
Recordings of Angela Papazoglou's music appear on two anthologies:

- Women of Rembetika 1908-1947, 4-CD collection, JSP Records, 2012
- Smirneiko Et Rebetiko: Les Grandes Chanteuses 1915-1936 (Smirneiko and Rebetiko: The Great Singers 1915–1936), Silex Records, 1995
