= Vassilis Tsitsanis =

Greek musical artist (1915–1984)

Vassilis Tsitsanis Βασίλης Τσιτσάνης

Background information
- Born: 18 January 1915; Trikala, Kingdom of Greece
- Died: 18 January 1984 (aged 69) Royal Brompton Hospital, London, England
- Occupations: Composer, songwriter, musician, singer
- Instrument: Bouzouki
- Spouse: Zoe Samara (m. 1942)
- Website: "Βασίλης Τσιτσάνης". Archived from the original on 7 December 2013.

Vassilis Tsitsanis (Greek: Βασίλης Τσιτσάνης 18 January 1915 – 18 January 1984) was a Greek songwriter and bouzouki player. He became one of the leading Greek composers of his time and is widely regarded as one of the founders of modern Rebetiko and Laiko music. Tsitsanis wrote more than 500 songs and is still remembered as an extraordinary composer and bouzouki player.

== Biography ==
Tsitsanis was born on 18 January 1915 in Trikala, Greece. His family came from the region of Epirus. He has been described as having been an Aromanian, and his surname Tsitsanis could indicate some connection with the Aromanians of Metsovo. He was the only figure performing rebetiko at his time coming from the Greek mainland and not from the islands. This may be the reason why he was sometimes known as "the Vlach" by his fellow musicians, although this could be due to the actually Aromanian ethnic origin of Tsitsanis (as Aromanians are known as Vlachs in Greece). It is also rumored that Stratos Pagioumtzis gave him this nickname. Tsitsanis was also nicknamed "Tsilias".

From a young age, Tsitsanis was interested in music and learned to play violin, mandola and mandolin which were mainstays of so many of his songs. In 1936, he left for Athens to study law, and by 1937 had also learned bouzouki and made his first musical recording. In 1938, he moved to Thessaloniki, where he completed his military service, and stayed there for about ten years, during the German occupation of Greece. There he became famous, opened also an ouzeri, got married and wrote many of his best songs that were later recorded after the end of the War. By the shut-down of the record companies by the German occupation Forces in 1941, he had already recorded about 100 of his own songs and played on many recordings of other composers.

In 1946, Tsitsanis returned to Athens and began recording many of his own compositions that made famous many of the singers that worked with him, such as Sotiria Bellou (Σωτηρία Μπέλου), Marika Ninou (Μαρίκα Νίνου), Ioanna Georgakopoulou and Prodromos Tsaousakis. Tsitsanis developed the "westernization" of the rebetiko and made it more known to large sections of the population, setting also the bases for the future laiko.

Vassilis Tsitsanis was a close friend with Andreas Papandreou, Prime Minister of the country. Tsitsanis died at the Royal Brompton Hospital in London following a lung operation, on his sixty-ninth birthday. He was mourned across Greece, where his music is still enjoyed to this day and he is regarded as a legend of rebetiko music.
