= Spyros Peristeris =

Spyros Peristeris (Greek: Σπύρος Περιστέρης; 1900 – 15 March 1966) was a Greek rebetiko composer and a mandolin and bouzouki player.

== Biography ==
He was born in 1900 in Smyrna in the Ottoman Empire, to Aristides, a musician, and Despina (née Bekou). Around 1914, his family moved to Constantinople; after the burning of Smyrna in 1922, Peristeris moved to Athens, Greece.

While in Athens, he became the artistic director of Odeon-Parlophone in Athens. He died in 1966 in Athens.
