= Giannis Tatasopoulos =

Greek musician (1928-2001)

- Also known as: "Dillinger" (Greek: Ο Ντίλινγκερ)
- Born: January 7, 1928
- Origin: Greece
- Died: October 21, 2001 (aged 73)
- Genres: Greek music
- Instruments: Bouzouki, Guitar

Giannis Tatasopoulos (Greek: Γιάννης Τατασόπουλος) (7 January 1928, in Kifissia, Greece - 21 October 2001) was a Greek musician and noted bouzouki master, soloist, and composer who achieved a number one hit in the national Greek charts in the 1950s and appeared a number of times on Greek national television. In the mid-1950s many of the top bouzouki soloists, including Giannis Tatasopoulos, emigrated to the United States. Giannis Tatasopoulos relocated to the United States in 1955 and decided to stay there in 1958. His son Nikos Tatasopoulos, who was born in the United States, is also a bouzouki master, and soloist. A dedication musical production was produced in 2011, ten years after his death, by Athina Krikeli and Ellopia Media Group Ellopia Media Group under the supervision of his son soloist Nikos Tatasopoulos
