= Kazantzidis =

Kazantzidis (Greek: Καζαντζίδης) is a Greek surname, from Turkish kazancı, "coppersmith". Notable people with the surname include:

- Stavros Kazantzidis, Australian-Greek writer
- Stelios Kazantzidis (1931–2001), Greek singer
