= Markos Vamvakaris =

Greek rebetiko musician (1905–1972)

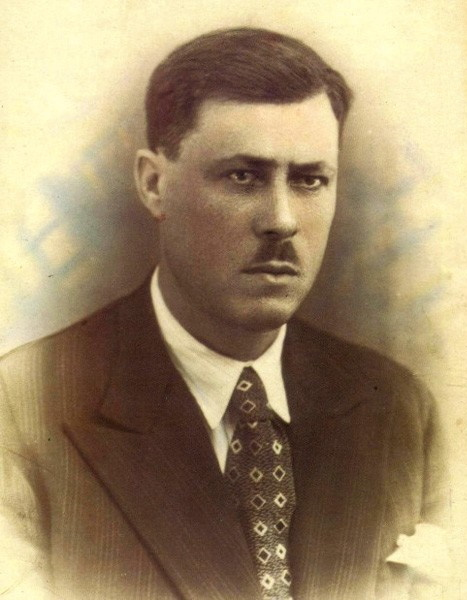
- Markos Vamvakaris

Background information
- Born: Markos Vamvakaris; 10 May 1905; Ano Syros, Kingdom of Greece
- Died: 8 February 1972 (aged 66) Nikaia, Attica, Kingdom of Greece
- Genre: Rebetiko
- Occupations: Musician, songwriter, artist
- Instruments: Singer, bouzouki
- Years active: 1932 – early 1960s
- Labels: Columbia Records, Parlophone, Odeon, His Master's Voice, RCA Victor
- Spouses: Eleni Mavroeidi (m. 1923; div. 1924); Evangelia Vergiou (m. 1943)

Markos Vamvakaris (Greek: Μάρκος Βαμβακάρης; 10 May 1905 – 8 February 1972), was a Greek musician of rebetiko, universally referred to by rebetiko writers and fans simply by his first name, Markos. Vamvakaris renown for the rebetiko is reflected in his nickname: the "patriarch of the rebetiko".

== Biography ==
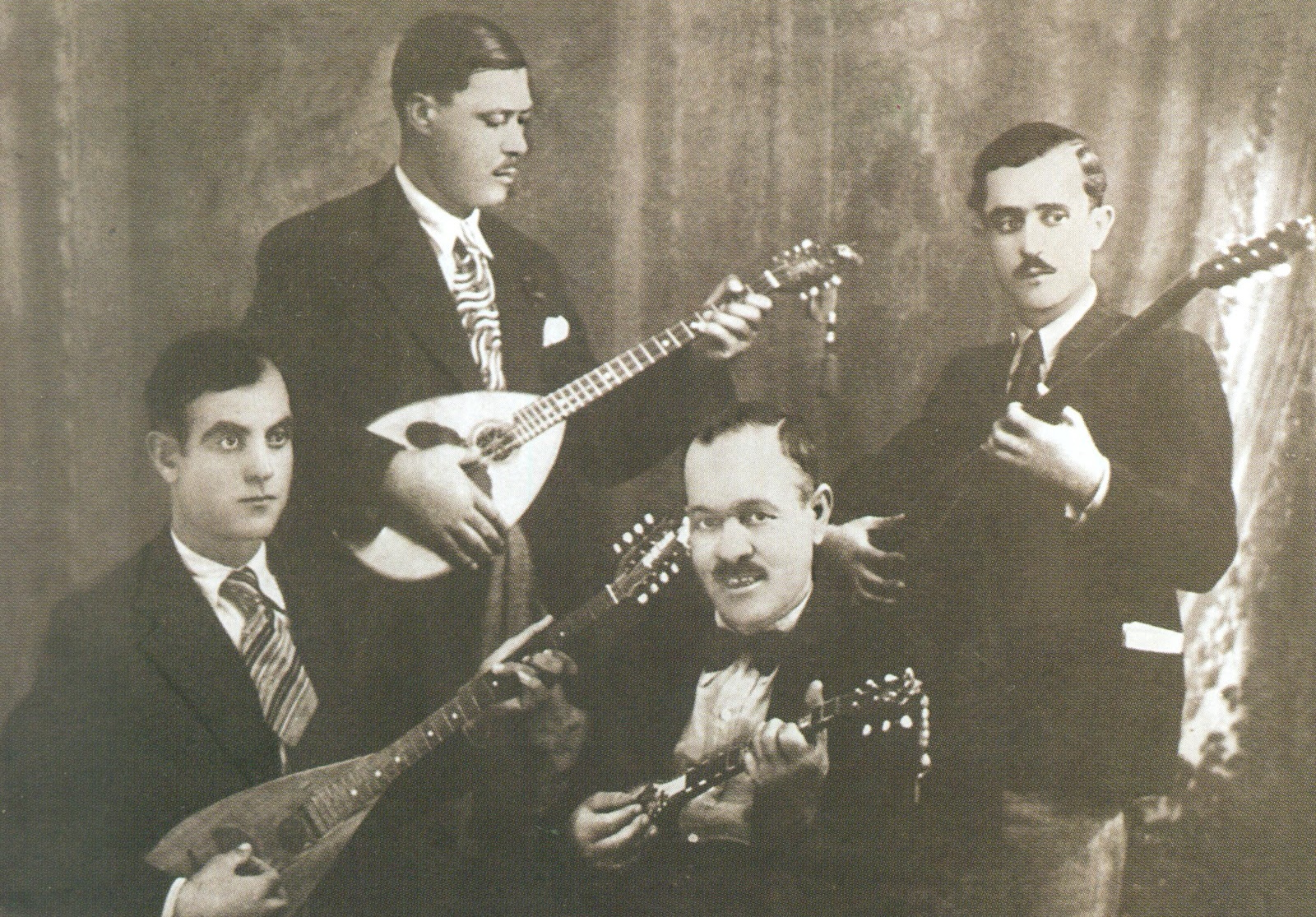
Members of The Famous Quartet of Piraeus, (l. to r.) Stratos Pagioumtzis, Markos Vamvakaris, Yiorgos Batis and Anestis Delias.

Vamvakaris was born on 10 May 1905 in Ano Syros (or Ano Khora), Syros, Greece. He was the first of six children, while his family belonged to the sizeable Roman Catholic community of the island.

At the age of twelve, in the false belief that he was wanted by the police, Vamvakaris fled Syros for the port of Piraeus. He worked at many different odd jobs during this period, among these as a stevedore, a pit-coal miner, a shoe-polisher, a paperboy, and a butcher. He heard a bouzouki player playing, and vowed that if he did not learn to play the instrument in six months, he would chop off his own hand with a cleaver (he was working in the public abattoirs at the time). He learned bouzouki, becoming an innovative virtuoso player, and began to write songs of his own. At first, he often played in clandestine hashish-smoking establishments known as tekés; later, he and his band, which included Giorgos Batis, Anestis Delias and Stratos Pagioumtzis played in more legitimate clubs and taverns. They were extremely popular, and Markos made many recordings. His initial nickname among the rebetes was "the Frank" (Fragos).

Spyros Peristeris, a well-educated musician and repertory manager and orchestra leader for several recording companies, persuaded Vamvakaris to record his songs, sung with his own voice. In 1932, Vamvakaris recorded his first rebetiko discs, Efoumernam' ena vrady (Εφουμέρναμ' ένα βράδυ) and 'Taxim Serf (Ταξίμ σερφ). Among other songs in that period, he wrote the classic love song "Frankosyriani" (Φραγκοσυριανή).

After the liberation of Greece from the occupation of Nazi Germany, difficult times persisted, but his kind of music was no longer fashionable. He also suffered badly of arthritis in his hands (which crippled his bouzouki playing), and from asthma (which hampered his singing).

The slump in his fortunes lasted until the early 1960s when, after initiatives by Vassilis Tsitsanis, many of his old songs were revived and sung by singers including Grigoris Bithikotsis, and Stratos Dionysiou.

Vamvakaris died of kidney failure, at his home in Nikaia, Attica, on 8 February 1972, at age 66.

Markos' composing style was utterly simple: minimal orchestration, melodic lines stripped of any embellishment, and lyrics as devoid of ornamentation as possible. His strophic masterpiece "Your eyelashes shine" is a typical example of his art. It consists of just three short couplets, each sung twice to the same melodic phrase, with clauses reversed for the second time, and with a single instrumental phrase interspersed between them:

Your eyelashes shine

like the flowers of the meadow.

Your eyes, sister,

make my little heart crack.

Search till you're blind:

you won't find another like me.

As the years pass, his towering contribution to Greek music emerges. All other Greek composers, of his time and afterwards, revere him as their master teacher, and Mikis Theodorakis remarked: "We all, we are but branches of a tree. Markos is that tree".

== Discography ==
Markos may be heard on many of the anthology CDs listed in the rebetiko discography. CDs of his own which may be available in English language countries include:

- Bouzouki Pioneer: 1932–1940, Rounder Select, 2006.
- 5-Master of Rembetika: 1932-1937 [box set] (4 discs), JSP Records, 2010.
- Road to Rembetika, Trad. Crossroads, 2014 (accompanying CD to the book by Gail Holst)

== Personal life ==
Markos married his first wife in a Catholic marriage. After he divorced her for cheating on him, he married his second wife, Evangelia, in a Greek Orthodox marriage. He had three sons: Vasilis, Stelios and Dominikos. Because he remarried, the Catholic Church excommunicated him until 1966, when he was allowed to participate in Holy Communion once again. Markos was a Roman Catholic and considered socialism the best social system. Despite being pro-socialism, he had also written a song about the Greek King George II. At one point he even declared "I am poor, Catholic and a Monarchist."

He was a supporter of Olympiacos.

== In popular culture ==
Stavros Xarchakos and Nikos Gatsos wrote a song called "Gramma sto Marko Vamvakari" (Letter to Markos Vamvakaris, Greek: Γράμμα στο Μάρκο Βαμβακάρη), sung by George Dalaras and actress Despo Diamantidou. Also, Thodoros Derveniotis and Kostas Virvos wrote "Markos", sung by Kaiti Abavi. Markos Vamvakaris is also mentioned in the following songs:

- "Deka palikaria" (Ten lads, Greek: Δέκα παλικάρια) by Manos Loïzos and Lefteris Papadopoulos, sung by George Dalaras
- "Ihes thalasses sta matia" (You had seas in your eyes, Greek: Είχες θάλασσες στα μάτια) by Elias Andriopoulos and Michalis Bourboulis, sung by Antonis Kalogiannis
- "I mikri istoria tis Marinas" (The short story of Marina, Greek: Η μικρή ιστορία της Μαρίνας) by Dionysis Tsaknis
- "Rock feggari" (Rock moon, Greek: Ροκ φεγγάρι) by Andreas Mexas and Vasilis Mastrokostas, sung by Paschalis Terzis
- "San ton Samouil sto Kougi" (Like Samuel in Koughi, Greek: Σαν τον Σαμουήλ στο Κούγκι) by Tzimis Panousis
- "Sto retire" (In the penthouse, Greek: Στο ρετιρέ) by Angelos Axiotis, sung by Antonis Kalogiannis
- "Ta mesimeria tis Kyriakis" (Sunday afternoons, Greek: Τα μεσημέρια της Κυριακής) by Giorgos Hatzinasios and Yiannis Logothetis, sung by Manolis Mitsias
- Graphic novel Rébétiko by David Prudhomme (Futuropolis, 2009)

There is a 2001 documentary made of his life and times, entitled I Like Hearts Like Mine, by George C. Zervas.
