= Ouzeri =

Type of Greek tavern

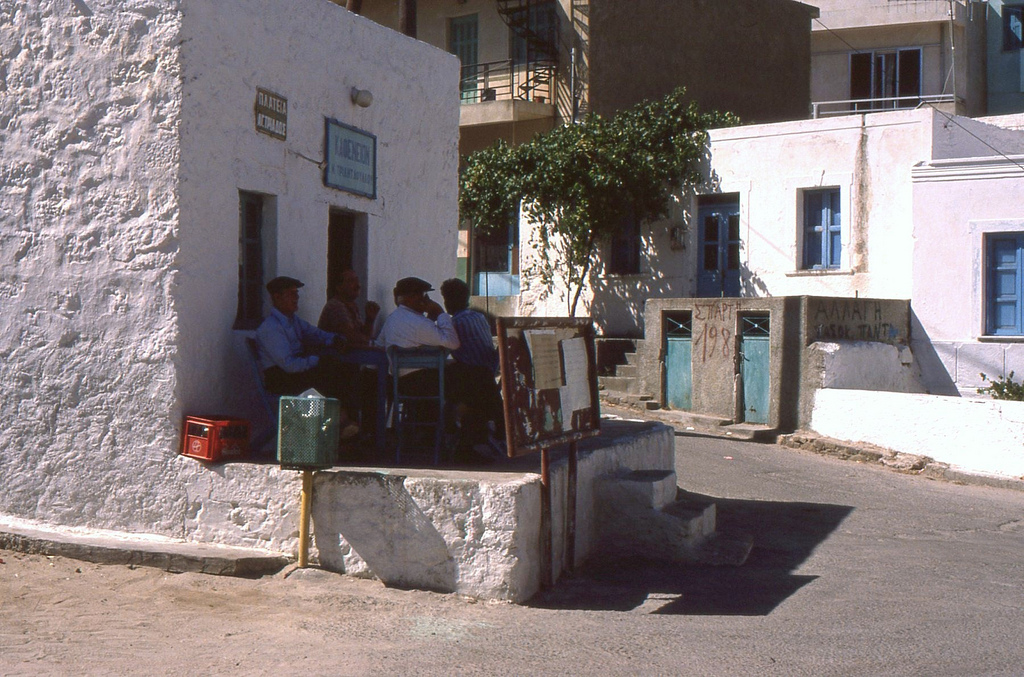
A traditional ouzeri on the Greek island of Kos

An ouzeri (Greek ουζερί IPA: [uzeˈri]) is a type of Greek tavern which serves ouzo (a Greek liquor) and mezedes (small finger foods).

Ouzeris are found in all cities and towns around Greece. The meals are prepared in the restaurant, unlike in the traditional kafenio. Among these are also meat-based and fish-based meals, again in contrast to a kafenio. An ouzeri is alternatively called a tsipouradiko, mezedopolio or ouzopolio.

On the menu, one may find the following options:

- various types of cheese, such as feta, kefalotyri and graviera;
- vegetables and salads, such as olives, tzatziki and Greek salad;
- preprepared meals like dolmades and broad beans from the oven;
- marinated, broiled and boiled meat and fish dishes like souvlaki, mussels, sardines, anchovies and pastirme.

A plate with a variety of small such dishes is called a pikilia (Greek ποικιλία). Traditionally, the ouzo is sipped slowly, often with water or ice, and taken alongside mezedes during the course of a few hours in the afternoon.

== Sources ==
- John Freely. Strolling through Athens: fourteen unforgettable walks through Europe's oldest city. Tauris Parke Paperbacks, 2004 ISBN 1-85043-595-2, ISBN 978-1-85043-595-2
