= Michalis Genitsaris =

Greek composer and singer

Michalis Genitsaris (Greek: Μιχάλης Γενίτσαρης or Γεννήτσαρης) (15 June 1917 – 11 May 2005) was a Greek singer and composer of the rebetiko genre. He was born and died in Agia Sofia, Piraeus. He was known as the last pre-war rebetiko singer. He composed such songs as Ego mangas fenomouna("I looked like a tough guy"), Enas leventis esvise ("A great lad has faded", dedicated to Aris Velouchiotis) etc. He was interviewed for the Australian SBS programme Music of the Outsiders in which he describes his encounter with a policeman when he was seventeen, the age at which he composed Ego mangas fenomouna.
