= Dimitris Gogos =

Dimitris Gogos Δημήτρης Γκόγκος
- Also known as: Bayianteras; Μπαγιαντέρας
- Born: 28 February 1903; Piraeus, Greece
- Died: 18 November 1985 (aged 82) Athens, Greece
- Genres: Rebetiko, laïko
- Occupations: Singer, composer
- Instruments: Bouzouki, mandolin, guitar, violin

Dimitris Gogos (Greek: Δημήτρης Γκόγκος; 28 February 1903 – 18 November 1985) was one of the most influential singers and composers of rebetiko music. Also called Bayianteras (Μπαγιαντέρας), a nickname that was given to him in 1925 for covering and playing in bouzouki Emmerich Kálmán's operetta, Die Bajadere, Gogos wrote songs that met great success and popularity in occupied Greece.
