= Giannis Papaioannou =

Greek musician and composer (1913–1972)

Giannis Papaioannou (Greek: Γιάννης Παπαϊωάννου; January 18, 1913 – August 3, 1972) was a famous Greek musician and composer born in Kios, Ottoman Empire (now Gemlik, Turkey). In English his name is sometimes romanticized as Yannis, Ioannis or Yiannis. Most active in the 1940s, he wrote many songs, some of which are today considered classics of the rebetiko folk music style. These include: Pente Ellines Ston Adi, Kapetan Andreas Zeppo, Modistroula, Prin To Charama Monachos, and Fovamai Mi Se Chaso. His style retains much of the musical quality of the classical rebetika of the likes of Markos Vamvakaris, although the thematic content of the lyrics tends not to focus as much on the typically dark topics – drugs, death and prison – of earlier rebetika.

He died in Athens on August 3, 1972 in a road accident and was buried in a cemetery in Kallithea, just southwest of Athens near the Tzitzifies area of south Kallithea where he, like many other rebetiko and laiko musicians, would frequently perform.

== Sources ==
- Gail Holst: Road to Rembetika, 5th ed., 1994: Denise Harvey & Co. (ISBN 9607120078)
- https://web.archive.org/web/20070817132741/http://www.rebetikorow.com/papa.htm
