= Oudola =

Greek stringed musical instrument

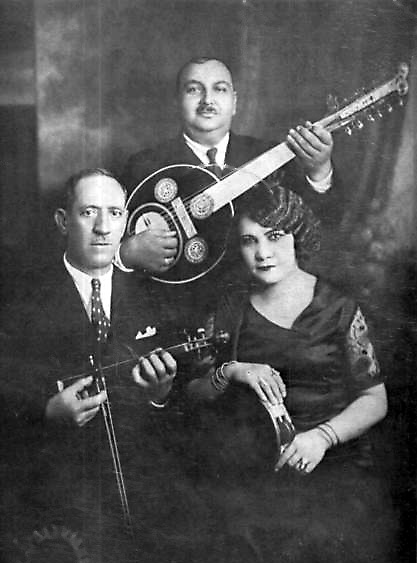
- Smyrna Trio (R-L) Dimitrios Semsis, Agapios Tomboulis(Oudola), Roza Eskenazi (Athens, 1932)
- Classification: Plucked string instrument: Necked bowl lutes; String instruments

Related instruments
- Cümbüş; Banjo; Ahenk; Turkish tambur

The Oudola is a stringed musical instrument. It is said to have been custom-built for Agapios Tomboulis, according to his own specifications. He combined the words oud and mandola, and named it oudola.

== See also ==
- Bouzouki
- Pandura
- Tambouras
- Cretan lyra
- Tzouras

External videos
- Ταμπούρ Αγάπιου Τομπούλη - κατασκευή 2014 Agapios Tomboulis oud-tambur
- Trixordo Andreas Papadamou - tambur -Ανδρέας Παπαδάμου Ταμπούρ
