= Kostas Skarvelis =

Greek composer

- Kostas Skarvelis

Background information
- Born: 1880; Istanbul, Ottoman Empire
- Died: 1942 (aged 61–62) Athens, Greece
- Genres: Rebetiko, laiko
- Instruments: Vocals, guitar
- Years active: 1910–1933
- Label: Columbia Records

Kostas Skarvelis (Greek: Κώστας Σκαρβέλης, 1880 – 8 April 1942) was a Greek composer of popular music, of the rembetiko (ρεμπέτικο) genre. He also wrote the lyrics for his songs and was an excellent guitar player, having participated in many recordings.

== Life ==
Skarvelis was born and grew up in Constantinople^{[a]}, Ottoman Empire, which at the time still had a significant Greek population. Due to unspecified adversities, during his childhood he was unable to attend a Greek school, hence lacked basic writing skills. He was nevertheless able to pursue his interest in music and had, by the age of 17, become a very good guitar player. Early in his adulthood he fled the country, never again to return, in order to avoid being drafted into the Turkish Army. He first settled in Alexandria in Egypt and eventually in Athens, Greece some time between 1915 and 1920. Before starting his career as a professional musician, Skarvelis worked as a specialist craftsman in the manufacturing of luxury shoes.

Following the defeat of the Greek Army in Asia Minor in 1922 and the expulsion of most Greeks from Turkey (and eventually a formal exchange of populations), Skarvelis was reunited in Greece with many musicians from those areas who arrived as refugees and with whom he shared a musical background. Notable among them were Antonis Diamantidis (Dalgkas), Kostas Karipis, Spyros Peristeris, Rita Abatzi, Grigoris Asikis. It was then that he started his professional career, initially as a guitarist and later as a composer as well.

Skarvelis eventually rose to the position of artistic director in the recording industry in 1930. From that position he further influenced the evolution of Greek music. He also helped with the instrumentation and as a guitarist in the recordings of most composers and artists he collaborated with.

Skarvelis continued to work as a live guitarist. Among others he worked with, he accompanied the famous Tetras (Markos Vamvakaris, Giorgos Batis, Stratos Pagioumtzis, Anestos Delias) in many of their performances.

He died of starvation in Athens on 8 April 1942, sharing the fate of hundreds of thousands of Greeks during the Great Famine that resulted from the occupation of Greece by the Axis during the Second World War.

== Work ==
Skarvelis composed hundreds of songs (recordings survive of over 200 of them). The singers he collaborated with for the recording of his songs include Giorgos Kavouras, Rita Abatzi, Kostas Roukounas, Stellakis Perpiniadis, Marika Frantzeskopoulou, Kostas Tsanakos, Markos Vamvakaris, Apostolos Chatzichristos. Among those, the lion's share belongs to Kavouras.

As a lyricist, Skarvelis mostly wrote songs about love. The majority belong to the subgenre of hasapiko (χασάπικο), of which he explored all variations. His musical signature is considered most representative of the Constantinopolitan urban musical tradition.

== Content notes ==
1. ^a Officially renamed to Istanbul only much later, in 1930.

== Sources ==
- (in Greek) Transcription of an article authored by P. Kounadis—originally featured in the sleeve of the CD "Συνθέτες του Ρεμπέτικου - Κώστας Σκαρβέλης"
