= Iovan Tsaous =

Greek musician and composer

Iovan Tsaous (Greek: Γιοβάν Τσαούς, from the Turkish word çavuş, meaning "sergeant"; 1893–1942) was a Greek musician and composer of rebetiko songs from Pontus. His real name was Yiannis Eitziridis or Etseiridis (Γιάννης Εϊτζιρίδης or Ετσειρίδης). He played the saz.

== Biography ==
Tsaous was born in 1893 in Kastamonu on Turkey's Black Sea coast. As a citizen of the Ottoman Empire, he completed his military service in the Ottoman army, attaining the rank of sergeant. (Note: Yovan is a Slavic form (adopted also by the Turks) of the Greek name Yiannis and çavuş is the Turkish word for sergeant.) After the Greco-Turkish War (1919–1922), he came to Greece as a refugee and settled in Piraeus. He worked initially as a tailor for some years, before opening an ouzeri. He and his wife died in 1942 of food poisoning during the famine caused by the Nazi-Fascist occupation during WWII. Much of the information on his life comes from descendants of his sister-in-law.

== Instruments ==
Yovan Tsaous is particularly noted for the unique instruments he played. (Note: A detailed illustrated analysis of the construction and fretting of these instruments, and of Tsaous' discography, is to be found in Kourousis, Stavros From Tambouras to Bouzouki - The History and Evolution of the Bouzouki and its first Recordings (1926-1932) Orpheum Phonograph ORPH-01 ISBN 978-618-80538-0-9 (2013)) They were custom-built for him in Piraeus by the luthier Kyriakos Peismatoglou, and differed in one important respect from other plucked long-necked lutes in use in Greece at this time, in that they were not fretted according to the equal temperament division of the octave into twelve identical semitones. Instead they (Note: At least the two surviving instruments, the sazi and the baglamas.) had sixteen frets to the octave, which permitted, among other things, the playing of microtonally different intervals such as the so-called three-quarter tone, and the neutral third, at certain positions on the fretboard. We know of at least three instruments, of which two have survived to the present day. The smallest was called baglamas, although it did not resemble the instrument known by that name in the rebetiko context, being considerably larger, and in fact rather corresponding to what Greeks call tzourás. The next in size was called sázi, which had approximately the same vibrating string length as a bouzouki. Finally there was an instrument whose identity is still obscure. It is to be heard very clearly playing an introductory taxim to the song Diamánto alaniára (Διαμάντω αλανιάρα), during which is to be heard the exclamation Γιά σου Γιοβάν Τσαούς με το ταμπούρη σού (approx: Hi there Yovan Tsaous with your tambouri). (Note: Pictures of the two surviving instruments, and an account of them in Greek, are to be found in the sleeve notes to the LP Γιοβάν Τσαούς AF97 (1988) published by the Falireas Bros. The LP contains twelve of Tsaous' recordings, including the one referred to here.) What this tambouri actually was we may never know. It sounds as though it is a fretless instrument, with perhaps a parchment head rather than a soundboard of wood. It appears that Tsaous was almost alone in playing these particular instruments; the fact that they did not produce equally tempered intervals made them problematic in ensemble work, and this is readily audible in his recordings, which have a unique sound. He appears to have had at least one co-musician who played similarly tuned instruments, namely one G. Kikídis (Greek: Γ. Κικίδης) who is given as playing bouzouki on a record label, but whose instrument pitches exactly in parallel with Tsaous' baglamas and does not sound like a bouzouki.

== Works ==
Tsaous is to be heard on at least fifteen recordings made between 1936 and 1937. The first twelve songs listed below were his own compositions. These songs have a truly idiosyncratic character, and resemble no other songs of the period in their melodic language, their subtle use of metre, and their use of intervals unusual in contemporary recordings. A further two songs were credited to Panagiotis Tountas, one more to Giorgos Kamvisis. The first six were sung by Antonis Kalyvopoulos, the following eight by Stellakis, and the last by Roza Eskenazi. Tsaous was band leader on at least the first twelve songs. He played three different instruments on his recordings (see previous section), none of which was a bouzouki, although the record labels often mention bouzoukia.

- Pénte mánges ston Piréa (Πέντε μάγκες στον Πειραία) – Five manges in Piraeus
- Iovan Tsaous (Γιοβάν Τσαούς)
- Paraponioúnte i mánges (Παραπονιούνται οι μάγκες) – The manges are complaining
- Katádikos (Κατάδικος) – Convict
- I Eleni i zontochira (Η Ελένη η ζωντοχήρα) – Eleni the divorcée
- O Prezákias (Ο πρεζάκιας) – The Junkie
- Vlámissa (Βλάμισσα) – Girlfriend
- Diamánto alaniára (Διαμάντω αλανιάρα) – Diamanto, tramp
- Gelasménos (Γελασμένος) – Fooled
- Mángissa (Μάγκισσα) – Mángas girl
- Se mia mikroúla (Σε μια μικρούλα) – To a little girl
- Drosáti Pelopónnisos (Δροσάτη Πελοπόννησος) – In the cool Peloponnese
- Egó thélo pringipéssa (Εγώ θέλω πριγκηπέσσα) – I want a princess (Panagiotis Tountas)
- I Varvára (Η Βαρβάρα) – Barbara (Panagiotis Tountas)
- Yia na kséreis (Γιά να ξέρεις) – You ought to know (Giorgos Kamvisis)

Tsaous' wife Katerina Charmoutzi (Greek: Κατερίνα Χαρμουτζή) was probably involved in writing the lyrics of Tsaous' songs.
