= Grigoris Asikis =

Musical artist (1890-1966)

Grigoris Asikis Γρηγόρης Ασίκης
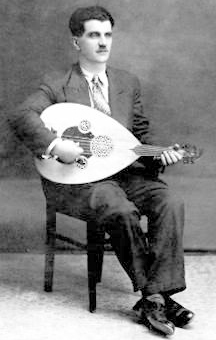

Background information
- Born: 1890; Istanbul, Constantinople Vilayet
- Died: 7 October 1966 (aged 75–76) Athens, Greece
- Genre: Rembetiko
- Occupations: Singer and songwriter
- Instrument: Oud
- Label: Columbia

Grigoris Asikis (Greek: Γρηγόρης Ασίκης) (1890, Istanbul, Constantinople Vilayet – 7 October 1966, Athens) was a Greek singer and songwriter of urban Greek music, Rembetiko. He wrote lyrics for most of the songs he recorded and played the outi (the Greek oud).

== Personal life ==
Asikis was the third child of Victor Asikis of Lesbos and Marianthi from the Kontoskali district of Constantinople. Ever since he was a child, he thought he had an exceptional voice and bought an outi at the age of 15. Asikis and his wife, Eirene Sotiriadou, and two children, Thanasis and Victor, moved to Athens, Greece. They moved to the Vyronas section of Athens and had four more children: Anastasia, Nikolaos, Basiles, and Manolis.

== Career ==
Having moved to Athens, Asikis tried to continue his professional career of fabricating bronze bed frames, but failed after six months. He would frequent a club called "The Asia Minor", the center of all laika at the time, where he was warmly accepted by contemporary musicians. In the late 1920s, he recorded music for Columbia, Odeon, and Parlophone as did other musicians at the time, like Kostas Skarvelis.

In total, Grigoris Asikis recorded 82 of his songs. In the 1930s his compositions were sung by many famous artists of the time including Kostas Nouros, Roza Eskenazi, Stellakis Perpiniadis, Rita Abatzi, Marika Politissa, Kostas Roukounas, Kostas Tsanakos, Marika Kanaropoulou, and Georgia Mettake. In the later part of the decade, he abandoned composing songs with Asia Minor instruments, i.e. outi, lyre, and violin, and wrote songs using the bouzouki. Some of these songs were sung by famous artists and close friends of his Markos Vamvakaris, Yiannis Papaioannou, and Apostolos Chatzichristos.
