= Kohava Levy =

Israeli singer-songwriter, composer, and poet

Kohava Levy כוכבה לוי
- Born: 1946 (age 79–80); Jerusalem, Israel
- Genre: Judeo-Spanish
- Occupations: Singer-songwriter, composer, poet
- Education: Rubin Academy of Music and Dance
- Spouse: Yitzhak Isaac Levy
- Children: 4, including Yasmin Levy

Kohava Levy (Hebrew: כוכבה לוי; born 1946) is an Israeli singer-songwriter, composer and poet in the Judeo-Spanish language, as was her husband Yitzhak Isaac Levy (who died in 1977) and daughter Yasmin Levy.

== Biography ==
After finishing her studies, she learned to develop her voice at the Rubin Academy of Music and Dance in Jerusalem. Kohava met her husband at Kol Yisrael (the "Voice of Israel" radio), when he was the director of Ladino programming and popular music. She appeared on a radio program called "Karas Muevas" ("New Faces") and was selected to participate. Yitzhak Levy was 27 years older than Kohava, but she married him despite the age difference and they had four children. Their sons Udi and Yuval are engineers, their daughter Smadar is a lawyer, and their youngest daughter Yasmin continues her parents' traditions and songs as a singer.

After the death of her husband, Kohava appeared on various radio programs and on television, singing the songs, romances and hymns in the books published by her husband. Her son Yuval produced the album "El Kanto de los Levitas" for her. It includes liturgical hymns interpreted by Kohava. Kohava continues her work at the Bureau of Matriculation in Jerusalem.

== Discography ==
=== Full albums ===
- 2011: Kanta Ladino
