= My Sweet Canary =

- Release date: 2011

My Sweet Canary (Greek: Καναρίνι μου Γλυκό) is a 2011 French-Greek-Israeli-German documentary film directed by Israeli Roy Sher about the life of Jewish-Greek rebetiko singer Roza Eskenazi.

== Plot ==
Three young musicians Martha Demeteri Lewis, Tomer Katz and Mehtap Demir, travel between London, Jerusalem, Corinth, Istanbul, Athens and Salonika seeking out the most famous rebetiko singers in order to learn more about the music career of Roza Eskenazi.

== Music ==
The music of the film is sung by the Israeli Yasmin Levy, the Greeks Maria Koti, Martha D Lewis, Sotiris Papatragiannis and the Turkish Mehtap Demir. In the film also participate the Greek singer Haris Alexiou, the Israeli Tomer Katz, playing the oud and the bouzouki and the Turkish Mumin Sesler, playing the kanun.

The film was presented in the Thessaloniki International Film Festival.
