= Mehtap Demir =

Turkish folk music singer

- Born: 1978 (age 47–48); Ardahan, Turkey
- Genres: folk
- Instrument: vocals
- Website: http://www.mehtapdemir.com/

Mehtap Demir (born 1978 in Ardahan) is a singer of Anatolian folk music from Turkey.

== Biography ==
Demir was born in 1978 in Ardahan, near the border with Georgia, and graduated from Boğaziçi University, holds a Ph.D. in Music Anthropology from Yeditepe University. During her doctoral studies, she moved to Israel for 6 months and studied the emigration and interaction of the cross-border music, of which the mizrahi music can be considered one of the most recent examples. She is a renowned kemane player.

She has been known by her focus on Anatolian folk music. She participated in the French-Greek-Israeli-German documentary film My Sweet Canary in 2011, about the life of Jewish-Greek rebetikó singer Roza Eskenazi. She is director of the Ethnomusicology and Folklore Department of the Istanbul University State Conservatory. She has performed at the opening of WOMEX in 2012, the Gibraltar Ethnic Music Festival and other world music festivals. In her most recent album, Le parfum d'asie mineure, she recorded traditional Anatolian songs that were found on rare records from the first decades of the 20th century.

=== Discography ===
- Türkülerimiz Söylenir Üç Kıtada (2000)
- Türkülerin Senfonisi (2008)
- Kemane ile Meditasyon (2009)
- Anadolu Ezgileriyle Ninniler (2009)
- My Sweet Canary – Soundtrack (2011)
- Mehtap (2012)
- Le parfum d'asie mineure (2016)

=== Filmography ===
- My Sweet Canary (2011)
