= Theo Lucas =

Cypriot singer-songwriter

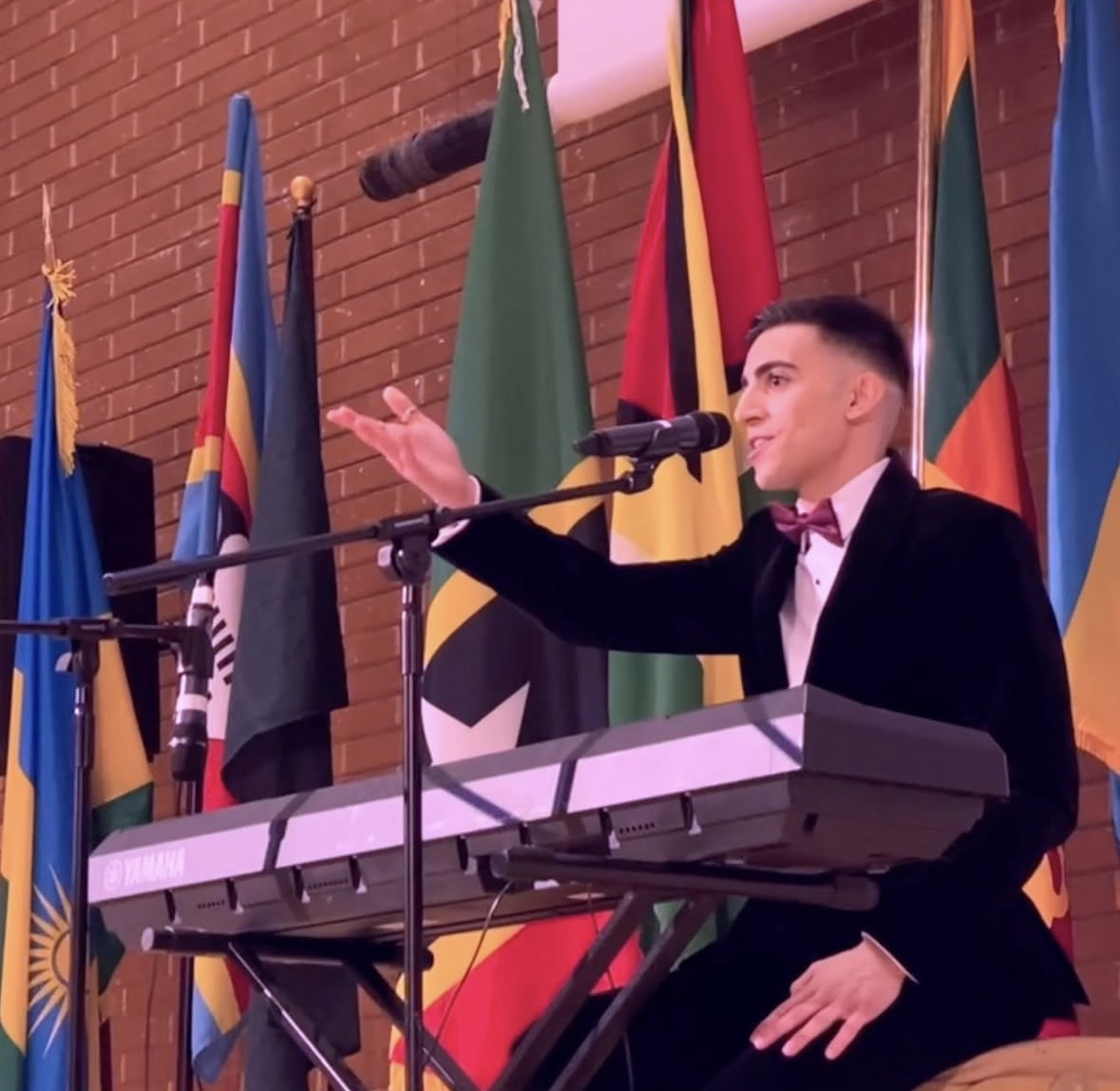
- Theo Lucas representing Cyprus at the Commonwealth, Kensington Town Hall, London.

Background information
- Born: Paphos, Cyprus
- Musical career
- Origin: London, United Kingdom
- Genres: Pop, EDM, Dance
- Occupations: Singer, Songwriter
- Instruments: Vocals, Piano
- Years active: 2020–present
- Label: Guesstimate Music
- Website: www.theolucas.com

Theo Lucas (Greek: Θέο Λούκας) is a British-Cypriot singer, songwriter, vocal producer, performer, dancer and pianist based in Athens and London. He released his debut single "Rolling Stone" in 2020, pursuing a solo career after being a songwriter. The track quickly amassed over 123,000 streams and received support from radio stations, including Track of The Week on Riverside Radio and other radio stations spanning London to Cyprus to America. "Rolling Stone" was co-written with UK songwriter Penny Foster, co-writer of Lana Del Rey's National Anthem and Say You Do by Sigala.

== Early life and education ==
Theo Lucas was born in the coastal city of Paphos, Cyprus. He began vocal, piano, music theory and dance lessons at the age of seven. Lucas then went on to study songwriting and vocals and graduate from the Academy of Contemporary Music in the UK.

== Music career ==
Lucas released his debut single, "Rolling Stone", in 2020, which received over 123,000 streams on Spotify. He collaborated with songwriter Penny Foster (Lana Del Rey, Sigala) and producer Patch Boshell (Oritsé Williams, Cian Ducrot) for the track. In 2024, Lucas gained recognition for his collaboration with DJ Thaylo on the dance track Not Over, released under the German label Guesstimate. This was followed by "Sunset Martinis", created alongside producer Lorenzo Cosi, which was described by Amelia Vandergast from AnR Factory as the "hedonistically hot EDM anthem of the summer".

Lucas has performed live across London and Brighton, including the opening of Battersea Power Station, Pride in London, Platinum Jubilee of Elizabeth II celebrations and High Commission of Cyprus, London. He also represented Cyprus during Commonwealth Day at Westminster Abbey.

In summer 2024 he performed as a guest at Martha D Lewis and Eve Polycarpou gig at Theatro Technis in the heart of London Borough of Camden. At the same gig, he performed a duet with Peter Polycarpou. He was also one of the opening acts at the CyWine Festival in North London alongside Eleftheria Eleftheriou and Junior Andre, son of Peter Andre. In 2025, Theo Lucas was one of the headliners at Cyprus Pride, performing in front of a large crowd and representing LGBT+ visibility through his music and performance. In 2026, Lucas performed at Europe House in London as part of Pride, organised by the European Union Delegation to the United Kingdom in collaboration with the Embassy of Mexico.

In November 2026, leading Eurovision news outlets reported that Theo Lucas is among the artists seeking to represent Greece at the Eurovision Song Contest 2027, having officially submitted his entry for Sing for Greece 2027, the country's national selection process.

== Style and influences ==
Theo Lucas' musical style has been described by AnR Factory as a fusion of electronic dance and pop. They also present Theo as an artist whose "sticky-sweet vocal lines can sugar the pill of any hangover".

Lucas' 2024 single "Sunset Martinis", which was described as "anthem of the summer" by AnR Factory and WPGM, blends progressive house pop with his cultural influences, with lyrics that draw on Cypriot mythology and his queer identity.

Lucas lists Kygo, Lorde, and Bruno Mars among his influences, drawing inspiration from their diverse sounds and ability to combine electronic and pop genres. In an interview with Cyprus Mail, he also cited Raye and Elton John as some of his music inspirations.

== Personal life ==
Theo Lucas resides in London and continues to actively collaborate with producers, DJs, and artists across Europe.

== Discography ==
Title	Year	Album or EP
"Rolling Stone"	2020	Non-album singles
"No Man's Land" with rapper Teknik	2024	Non-album singles
"Sunset Martinis"	2024	Non-album singles
"Not Over" with DJ Thaylo	2024	Non-album singles
"Tears" with DJ Zaber	2025	Non-album singles
