= Amanes =

Traditional vocal musical genre from the Eastern Mediterranean

- Native name: Αμανές
- Stylistic origins: Ottoman classical music makam tradition
- Cultural origins: Ottoman Empire (especially Asia Minor)
- Typical instruments: Voice, santouri, Politiki lyra, oud, kanun, clarinet
- Derivative forms: Rebetiko

Example of Amanes Song: Gazeli Sehnaz Artist: Roza Eskenazy

Amanes is a traditional vocal musical genre of the Eastern Mediterranean, particularly associated with Greek music, the broader legacy of the Ottoman Empire. It is known for its emotional, melismatic, and improvisational singing style, often featuring the word aman (meaning "mercy" or "alas") as a cry of lament.

== Etymology ==
The term amanes derives from the interjection aman, an exclamation used in both Greek and Turkish expressing pain, sorrow, or supplication. The frequent occurrence of the word aman in the lyrics gave the genre its name.

== Characteristics ==
Amanes is typically:

- Slow and mournful
- Heavily melismatic (ornamented)
- Based on makam (modal) structures
- Non-metric or featuring free rhythm
- Focused on themes of pain, exile, love, and nostalgia

The genre is considered a vocal form of lament or spiritual improvisation, comparable to the Arabic mawwal and Turkish gazel.

== Historical Background ==
=== Ottoman Era ===
Amanes originated and flourished in the multiethnic urban centers of the Ottoman Empire, such as Smyrna (modern-day İzmir), Istanbul, and Thessaloniki. It was influenced by Turkish, Greek, Armenian, and Arabic musical traditions.

=== Asia Minor Catastrophe and Rebetiko ===
After the Greco-Turkish War (1919–1922) and the population exchange between Greece and Turkey, Greek refugees from Asia Minor brought the amanes to mainland Greece. It became a fundamental element of early Rebetiko music, especially among performers from the Smyrna school.

== Notable Artists ==
- Roza Eskenazi – famed for her expressive amanedes and recordings in the 1930s.
- Antonis Diamantidis (Dalgas) – a powerful interpreter in the Smyrneiko style.
- Stratos Pagioumtzis – integrated amanes into his Rebetiko performances.
- Giannis Papaioannou – preserved the tradition in mid-20th-century recordings.
- Marika Papagika

== Decline and Revival ==
During the post-war era, amanes was often marginalized as being "oriental" and not in line with Westernized cultural ideals. However, from the late 20th century onwards, it has experienced a revival among ethnomusicologists and folk musicians. Contemporary artists have revisited amanes as a crucial part of Greek musical heritage.

== Related genres ==
- Rebetiko
- Smyrneiko
- Mawwal
- Gazel
- Laïkó
- Taksim (instrumental improvisation)

== See also ==
- Greek folk music
- Music of Turkey
- Makam
- Orientalism in music
