= She and the Three =

She and the Three may refer to:

- She and the Three (1922 film), a German silent comedy film
- She and the Three (1935 film), a German comedy crime film
