= Panagiotis Toundas =

Greek composer

- Born: 1886; Smyrna, Ottoman Empire (now İzmir)
- Died: 23 May 1942 (aged 55–56); Athens, Greece
- Occupation: Composer

Panagiotis Toundas (Greek: Παναγιώτης Τούντας; 1886 – 23 May 1942) was a Greek composer of the early 20th century.

== Biography ==
He is probably the most famous representative of the "Smyrna School" and made a notable contribution to the creation of rebetiko music in Greece. He was born in Smyrna and from a young age he learned to play the mandolin. In the early 20th century became a member of the Smyrneiki Estudiantina. He joined many groups and traveled a lot, especially to the Greek diaspora.

After the Great fire of Smyrna he went to Athens. In 1924, he became director of the local annex of Odeon Records. He worked with all the major record labels in Greece and was responsible for the most recordings of the era. In 1931 he assumed the position of art director for Columbia Records, and the Gramophone Company, until 1940. He worked with many musicians and many of his rebetiko songs were sung by well-known singers, such as Stelios Perpiniadis, Kostas Roukounas, Roza Eskenazi and Rita Abatzi.

Panagiotis Toundas died on 23 May 1942 in Athens.
