= Antonis Diamantidis =

Greek musician (1892–1945)

- Antonis "Dalgas" Diamantidis

Background information
- Also known as: Dalgas
- Born: 1892; Istanbul, Ottoman Empire
- Died: 1945 (aged 52–53) Athens, Greece
- Genres: Rebetiko, laiko
- Instruments: Vocals, guitar, oud
- Years active: 1910–1933
- Label: His Master's Voice

Antonis Diamantidis (Greek: Αντώνης Διαμαντίδης), also known as Antonis Dalgas (Greek: Αντώνης Νταλγκάς) was a Greek musician. He was notable for his rebetiko songs. He was also a songwriter and best known as a singer.

== Life and career ==
Diamantidis was born in 1892 in the Arnavutköy suburb of Istanbul (then Constantinople) in the Ottoman Empire (present-day Turkey). He took up music from an early age, learning to play both the guitar and the oud, and by 1910 he began to work professionally as a singer. Because of the unusual and stirring "waves" in his voice, he was given the nickname Dalgas ("Νταλγκάς" which means "passion" in Greek, and "ripple" in Turkish), by which he would be known for the rest of his professional career. In 1919, he married Argyro Nikolaou in Istanbul, with whom he had one daughter, Anna. From 1920 to 1922, he and his band entertained Greek immigrants to America on the ocean liner "King Alexandros." It was during one of these voyages that he learned of the Catastrophe in Asia Minor, and he afterwards settled permanently in Greece with his family, first in Piraeus and later in Petralona. In the early years, he worked as a singer and musician in various cafés featuring Smyrneiko, Rebetiko and Laiko music. Among his associates at the time were Costas Tzovenos, Dimitrios Semsis, Kostas Karipis and Spyros Peristeris. During this time he also began to compose his own music. Between 1926 and 1933, he recorded more than 400 traditional and rebetiko songs, primarily under the His Master's Voice label. His vocal abilities were unprecedented, and as a result of his talent he emerged as one of the most lauded of his era, alongside other "manes" performers like Costas Nouri and Vangeli Sofroniou. After 1933, he stopped appearing as a musician, and largely disappeared from recording, preferring live performances in exclusive venues, and focusing on a lighter genre of popular romantic songs. His main partner in this era was Mark Philandros, who later married his daughter Anna. From 1937 to 1939, Dalgas made a brief reappearance in the music industry as a composer, recording a small number of songs, and he continued to perform until 1941. With the arrival of the Germans in Athens, however, Dalgas sunk into a deep depression, and he eventually died under mysterious circumstances in early 1945.
