= Agapios Tomboulis =

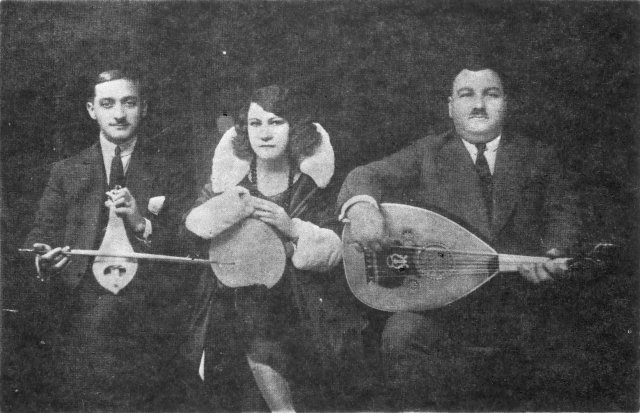
- Smyrna style trio: K. Lambros, R. Eskenazi, A. Tomboulis (Athens, 1930)

Background information
- Born: 1891; Constantinople, Ottoman Empire
- Died: 1965 (73-74) Athens, Greece
- Genres: Rebetiko (Smyrneiko)
- Occupation: Oudist
- Years active: 1900s-1965
- Formerly of: Smyrna Trio

Agapios Tomboulis (Hagop Stambulyan) (Greek: Αγάπιος Τομπούλης; 1891–1965) was a famous Armenian and Greek oud player of rebetiko and Greek folk music, Armenian folk music, Turkish folk music, Jewish folk music born in Constantinople, he is known for being a well known associate of Roza Eskenazi.

== Life and career ==
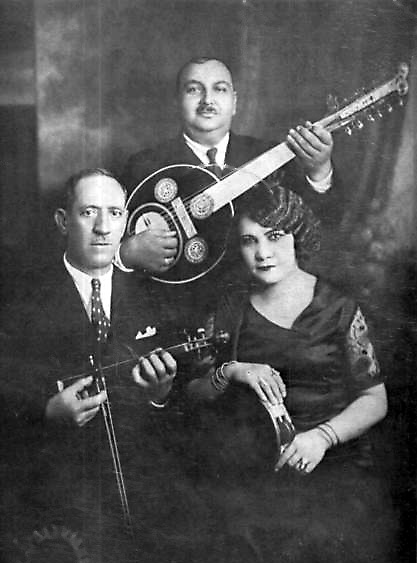
Smyrna Trio (R-L) Dimitrios Semsis, Agapios Tomboulis, Roza Eskenazi (Athens, 1932)

=== Early life ===
Hagop Stambulyan was born in 1891 in the Pera district of İstanbul to an Armenian father and a Greek mother.
