= Yitzhak (Isaac) Levy =

Israeli singer-songwriter, musicologist, and composer

Yitzhak (Isaac) Levy יצחק לוי
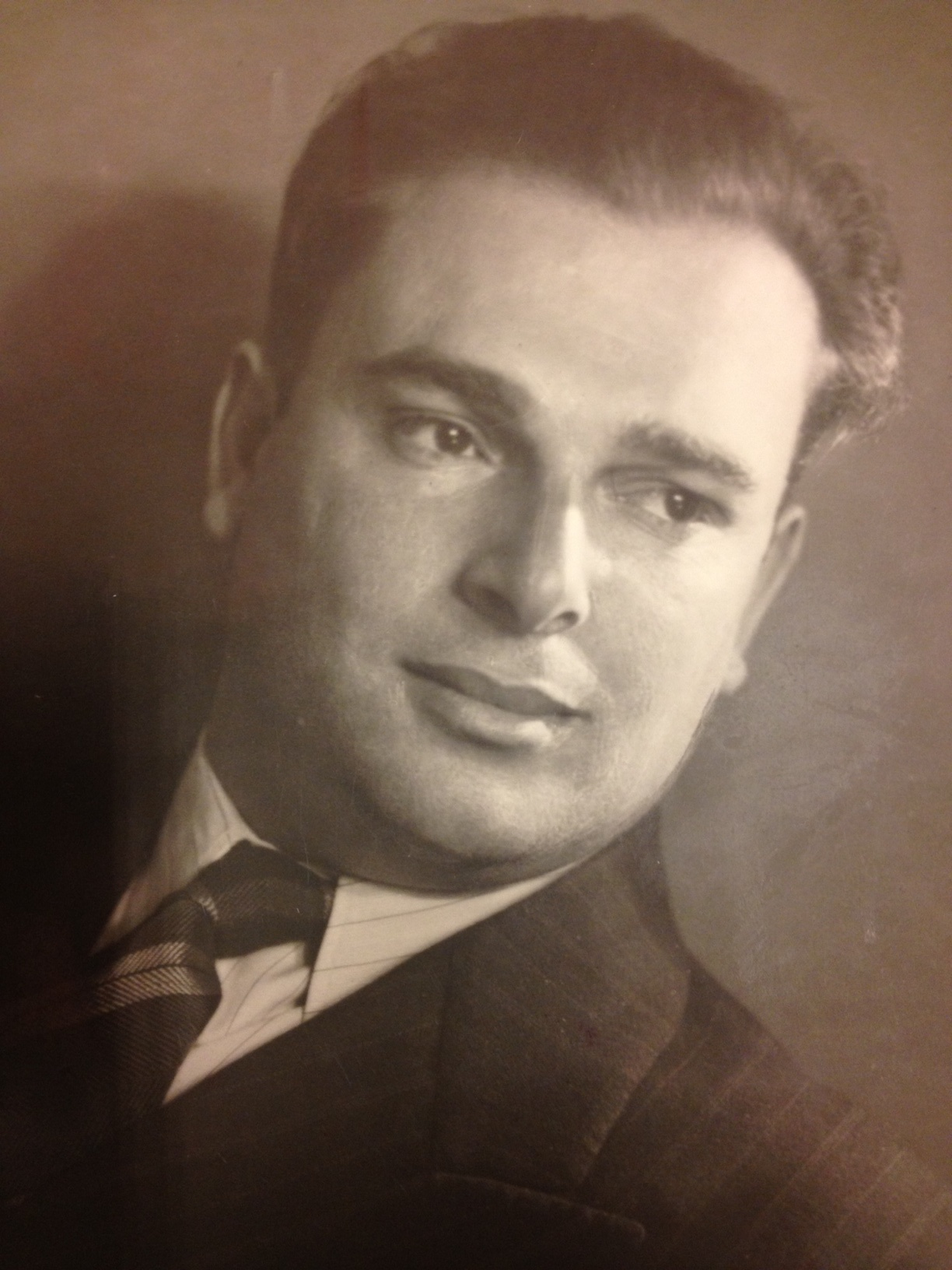
- Yitzhak (Isaac) Levy

Background information
- Born: 15 May 1919; Manisa, Turkey
- Died: 21 July 1977 (aged 58) Jerusalem, Israel
- Genre: Judeo-Spanish
- Occupations: Singer-songwriter, musicologist, composer
- Education: Jerusalem Academy of Music and Dance, Rubin Academy of Music
- Spouse: Kohava Levy
- Children: 4, including Yasmin Levy

Yitzhak (Isaac) Levy (Hebrew: יצחק לוי; 15 May 1919 – 21 July 1977) was an Israeli singer-songwriter, musicologist and composer in Judaeo-Spanish. He also worked as director of a radio program and was an author of various works on musicology.

== Biography ==
Yitzhak Levy was born in Manisa, near İzmir, to a Sephardic Jewish family, and moved with his parents to Mandatory Palestine in 1922 at the age of three. He studied at the Conservatory of Music in Jerusalem (now the Jerusalem Academy of Music and Dance האקדמיה למוסיקה ולמחול בירושלים) and in Tel Aviv at the Samuel Rubin Israel Academy of Music (now the Buchmann-Mehta School of Music), where he developed his baritone. Levy composed music for Biblical verses and piyyutim written by poets of the golden age of Jewish culture in Spain, such as Judah Halevi, Solomon ibn Gabirol, Abraham ibn Ezra, and others.

In 1954 he founded a series of broadcasts in Judaeo-Spanish for the Israeli public radio, Kol Yisrael ("Voice of Israel"). With his wife Kohava Levy (born in 1946), Yitzhak Levy had four children, including Yasmin Levy who continues his musical tradition. Kohava Levy is also a singer of Sephardic songs and is a skilled interpreter of Sephardic music. In 1963 he was nominated as director of the section of ethnic music of Kol Yisrael.

== Bibliography ==
- Yitzhak Levy Cante Judeo-Español. (Yitzhak Levy Sings, Judeo-Spanish) Association Vidas Largas, Paris 1980
- Chants judéo-espagnols. (Judeo-Spanish Songs) vol. I, London, World Sephardi Federation, [1959]; vols. II, Jerusalem, author, 1970; vol. III, Jerusalem, author, 1971; vol. IV, Jerusalem, author, 1973. Ver
- Antología de Liturgia Judeo-Española. (Anthology of Judeo-Spanish Liturgy) vols. I-VIII, Jerusalem, author-Ministry of Education and Culture, s.a.; vol. IX, id., 1977; vol. X, written by Moshe Giora Elimelekh, Jerusalem, Institute of Studies of Judeo-Spanish Songs, 1980
