= She and the Three (1922 film) =

1922 film directed by E. A. Dupont

- German: Sie und die Drei
- Directed by: Ewald André Dupont
- Written by: Max Jungk; Julius Urgiß
- Produced by: Henny Porten
- Starring: Henny Porten; Hermann Thimig; Robert Scholz
- Cinematography: Helmar Lerski
- Production company: Henny Porten Filmproduktion
- Distributed by: UFA
- Release date: 23 June 1922
- Country: Germany
- Languages: Silent; German intertitles

She and the Three (German: Sie und die Drei) is a 1922 German silent comedy film directed by E. A. Dupont and starring Henny Porten, Hermann Thimig, and Robert Scholz.

The film's sets were designed by the art director Ludwig Kainer.

== Plot ==
Lia Lona is a celebrated film diva. One day, when she is presented with a certificate by a film club that bears her name in her honour, she considers the man who wants to give her a diploma to be a thief. Then things start to get turbulent. In the moving train, she pulls the emergency brake on the run and is then arrested. The accusation, which is a total nonsense, brings her to court where the judge assigns Lia has to start five days of arrest for her hasty action. But for the film diva, the punishment becomes an amusing and lively change from everyday acting. Cleverly, she can also instruct her film crew to use these "holidays from the self" to produce semi-documentary footage, which she plans to weave into her next film.

== Cast ==
- Henny Porten as "Sie", Lia Lona, actress
- Hermann Thimig as The Gentle
- Robert Scholz as stormer
- Jakob Tiedtke as unknown
- Hermann Picha as the Lord with the sense of normality
- Oscar Sabo as cautious man Jouissance
- Paul Graetz as director
- Kurt Vespermann as screenwriter
- Charles Puffy as Film director
- Blandine Ebinger as Die Zofe
- Hermann Vallentin as Räuberhauptmann Krause
- Leonhard Haskel as Der Wärter
- Max Adalbert as Der einseifende Herr
- Hans Wassmann as Der Lenker der "grünen Minna"
- Willi Schaeffers as Chairperson of Lia Lona Club
- Gert Sascha as man with a television set
- Curt Bois as assistant director
- Fritz Schulz as shoeshiner
- Carl Geppert as Oberkellner im Hotel "Zur Qualle"
- Georg Baselt as Der Torhüter
- Toni Zimmerer as Zugführer
- Theo Sigmund as Chief judge
- Anton Herrnfeld
- Max Zilzer as criminal defense lawyer
- Rudolf Meinhard-Jünger as criminal defense lawyer
- Hugo Döblin as criminal defense lawyer
- Siegfried Berisch as criminal defense lawyer
- Rudolf Bergel as criminal defense lawyer
- Ferdinand Grünecker as criminal defense lawyer
- Arthur Bergen as criminal defense lawyer
- Otto Schiller as criminal defense lawyer
- Emil Albes as court usher
- Adolphe Engers as raver for cinema and soup
- Franz Groß as man of honour behind Swedish curtains
- Harald Paulsen as man of honour behind Swedish curtains
- Georg John as man of honour behind Swedish curtains
- Theo Lucas as man of honour behind Swedish curtains
- Ernst Laskowski as man of honour behind Swedish curtains
- Paul Westermeier as criminal shimmy dancer
- Senta Söneland as lady of honour behind Swedish curtains
- Margarete Kupfer as lady of honour behind Swedish curtains
- Maria Forescu as lady of honour behind Swedish curtains
- Josefine Dora as chubby bathing woman
- Marie Grimm-Einödshofer as lady with the scouring cloth
