= Smyrna Trio =

20th century Greek musical trio

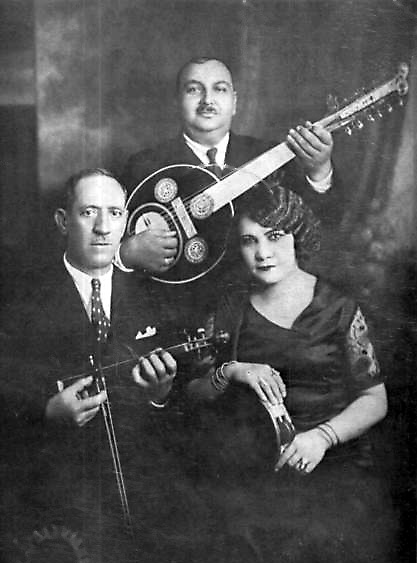
- (R-L) Dimitrios Semsis, Agapios Tomboulis, Roza Eskenazi (Athens, 1932)

Background information
- Origin: Athens, Greece
- Genres: Rebetiko
- Years active: 1930–193?
- Members: Roza Eskenazi; Agapios Tomboulis; Dimitrios Sensis; Lambros Leondaridis

Smyrna Trio were a rebetiko trio consisting of Roza Eskenazi (vocals, percussion), Agapios Tomboulis (Oud) and Lambros Leondaridis (Classical kemençe). The trio would briefly become a Quartet in 1932 when violinist Dimitrios Semsis joined. Soon after the quartet would revert to a trio when Lambros Leondaridis left the group some time in 1932.

== Background ==
Roza Eskenazi started her career sometime in the 1920s as a solo performer where she would sing for patrons of the clubs in Greek, Turkish, and Armenian. It was in the club scene where she was first "discovered" by well-known composer and impresario Panagiotis Toundas in the late 1920s. Toundas immediately recognized her talent and introduced her to Vassilis Toumbakaris of Columbia Records. Roza, in 1929, cut four sides for Columbia, three of which were amanedes (Tzivaeri, Minore, and Matzore) and one demotic (Emorfi Pou Ein I Leivadia).

It was around 1929 when Rosa first met Oudist; Agapios Tomboulis. Tomboulis began playing for Roza on the club scene for the rest of 1929. The following year they both met classical kemençe player Lambros Leondaridis, after the pair's meeting Leondaridis he began playing with them in the clubs. That year they formed the Smyrna Trio.

== Early years (1930-32) ==
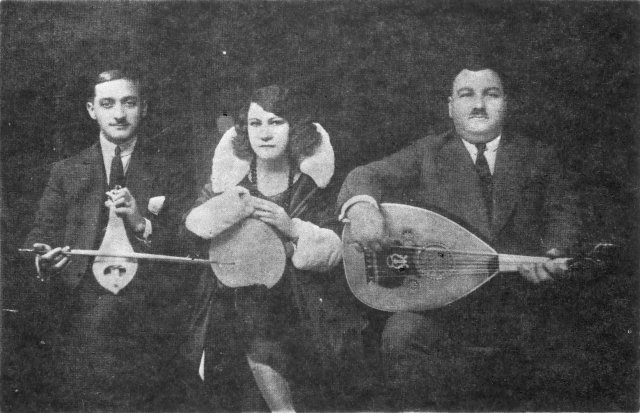
K. Lambros, R. Eskenazi, A. Tomboulis (Athens, c. 1930)

Roza continued recording records for Columbia with Tomboulis and Leondaridis playing the instrumentation on the record tho they were officially a trio Columbia credit the recordings to just Roza. Some of the music was folk songs, especially from Greece and Smyrna (İzmir) in Turkey. Her most important contribution to the local music scene, however, was her recordings of Rebetiko and especially the Smyrna school of Rebetiko. She was, almost single-handedly, responsible for the breakthrough of this style into popular culture, and even today her unique sound is still identified with the genre but as they were not credited as a trio, Agapios Tomboulis and Lambros Leondaridis were overshadowed as to their contribution to the genre becoming into popular culture.
