= Kostas Roukounas =

Greek singer

Kostas Roukounas

Konstantinos (Kostas) Roukounas (Greek: Κώστας Ρούκουνας; Principality of Samos, 1903 – Athens, 11 March 1984) was a Greek singer. His repertoire included both "traditional" (δημοτικά) and "popular" songs (λαϊκά). Most notable is his contribution to the genre of rebetiko (ρεμπέτικο). Roukounas is generally known as a singer, however he was also a songwriter.

== Life ==
Roukounas came from a poor family and thus had to start working from the age of eight, initially at a cigarette manufacturing business and later as a carpenter. He began his artistic career in the mid-1920s as a singer at a taverna. Young Roukounas soon became famous among his fellow islanders of Samos for his fine voice, specialising in Smyrneika (songs originating from the nearby coast of Asia Minor). Shortly thereafter, he moved to Athens (in 1927 or 1928). There he sang professionally on various festive occasions until he was discovered by Panagiotis Toundas, a leading composer and recording industry executive. Tountas got Roukounas to make his first recordings on 78 rpm records. With his versatile voice, he excelled in virtually all subgenres of traditional and rebetiko music. Deserving particular mention are his renditions of the most demanding technically and semi-improvisational manedes. Roukounas collaborated with many composers throughout his long career, particularly Panagiotis Tountas, Spyros Peristeris, Kostas Skarvelis, and Grigoris Asikis.

He married the singer Anna Pagana who died of a heart attack in 1943. Roukounas married his second wife, lyricist Alexandra Kyriazi, in 1948. They lived together in a suburb of Athens until his death in 1984.
