= Martha D Lewis =

British performing and recording artist

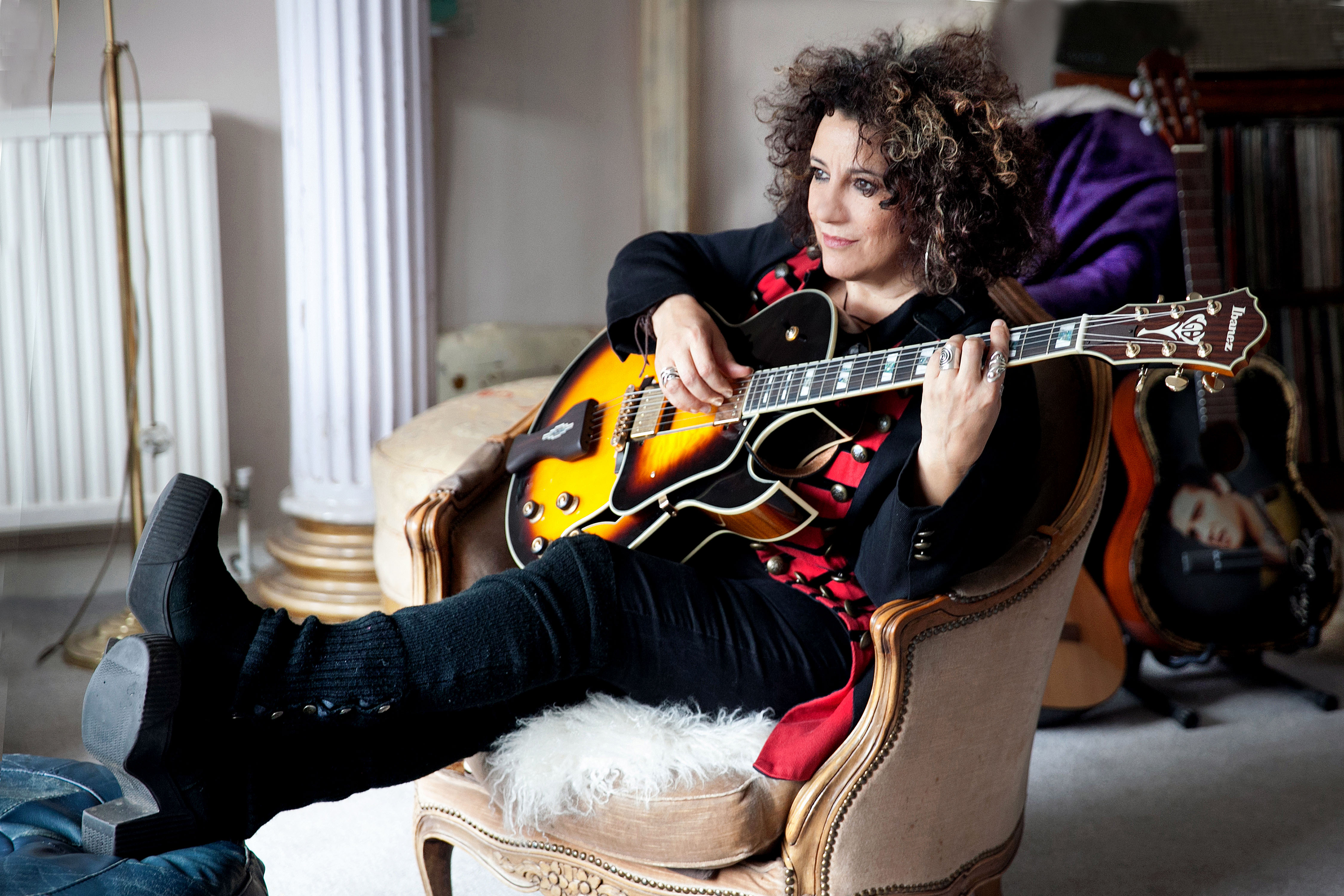

Martha D Lewis (aka Martha Lewis and Martha Demetri Lewis; born 1967 in London) is a British performing and recording artist regularly performing in the contemporary jazz and world music scene in the UK and Europe. She is also a presenter, broadcaster, composer, multi-instrumentalist and educator. Lewis' work combines Mediterranean and other world musical influences with jazz and electronica. Lewis is Patron of the Leukaemia Cancer Society UK.

Lewis' musical work is included in the British Library.

In 2018, Lewis gained a master's degree in songwriting. In 2022, Lewis moved away from her trademark Mediterranean world jazz genre and released her 6th album, All That You See, an album of songs recorded at Peter Gabriel’s, 'Real World' Studio in UK. The album was produced by producer and bass player, Nick Cohen and mixed by producer and engineer, Stephen W Tayler. Also in 2022, Lewis established a new platform called UK Jazz Plus created to promote and spotlight new storytelling in jazz.

== Biography ==
Martha was born and raised in London to Greek Cypriot immigrant parents. At seven years old, she studied guitar and voice and formed a semi-pro covers band at the age of 14 years. She went on to study music at Middlesex University, where she also studied opera singing for three years. After graduating Martha's career was launched as part of a group representing Cyprus in the Eurovision Song Contest in Luxembourg.

Martha's went on to form the award-winning music-comedy duo Donna & Kebab the early 1990s. This long term and ongoing creative partnership with singer musician actress, Eve Polycarpou rapidly accumulated TV, radio and theatre credits. The duo have toured throughout UK Europe and Middle East. In 1995, 'Donna & Kebab', renamed Martha and Eve, focused their attention on their prolific songwriting skills and have recorded three albums, a club single and a DVD of their show Live at the Hackney Empire.

Martha's solo project was launched in 1999 following a commission by The Arts Council of Great Britain for a 30-minute musical work, this work was broadcast by BBC Radio 3. Martha has since received numerous commissions for music work including further works from the Arts Council, PRS foundation, London Arts Board, music festivals, a short film Silences; theatre plays Mrs Ruskin, Lucrezia; title and incidental music for Channel 4 documentaries Midlife, Mind.

Martha has released two CD's as a solo artist. Martha D Lewis-Cafe Aman-Double Life released in 2007. Lewis's most recent large scale project was as a singer and presenter in the film documentary My Sweet Canary about the life and music of Roza Eskenazy. Following Lewis’ participation in the film, she released her second solo CD in 2015 Homage To Roza an album of contemporary interpretations and arrangements of classic Greek Blues, specifically Eskenazy repertoire, from 1920s to the 1950s. This album featured drummer Jack De Johnette. Martha's previous 2010 release of ‘Misirlou’ was featured on the ‘Best of European Jazz 2010’ compilation for The EFG London Jazz Festival.

Martha presented a documentary on 'BBC Radio 3' entitled, A Journey Into Rembetika-Music of the Outsiders

== Discography ==
=== Martha & Eve ===
- Donna & Kbb are Martha and Eve (1996)
- Je t’aime / Don’t talk (1999) Club 12" Single
- Stay (2000)
- Absolutely Live (2006)

=== Solo ===
- Café Aman - Double Life (2007)
- Homage To Roza (2015)
- All That You See (2022)

== On Film ==
- Martha and Eve - Live show at the Hackney Empire DVD filmed by TVS. (1993)
- My Sweet Canary (2011) Feature film documentary.
