= Yasmin Levy =

Ladino singer (born 1975)

Yasmin Levy יסמין לוי
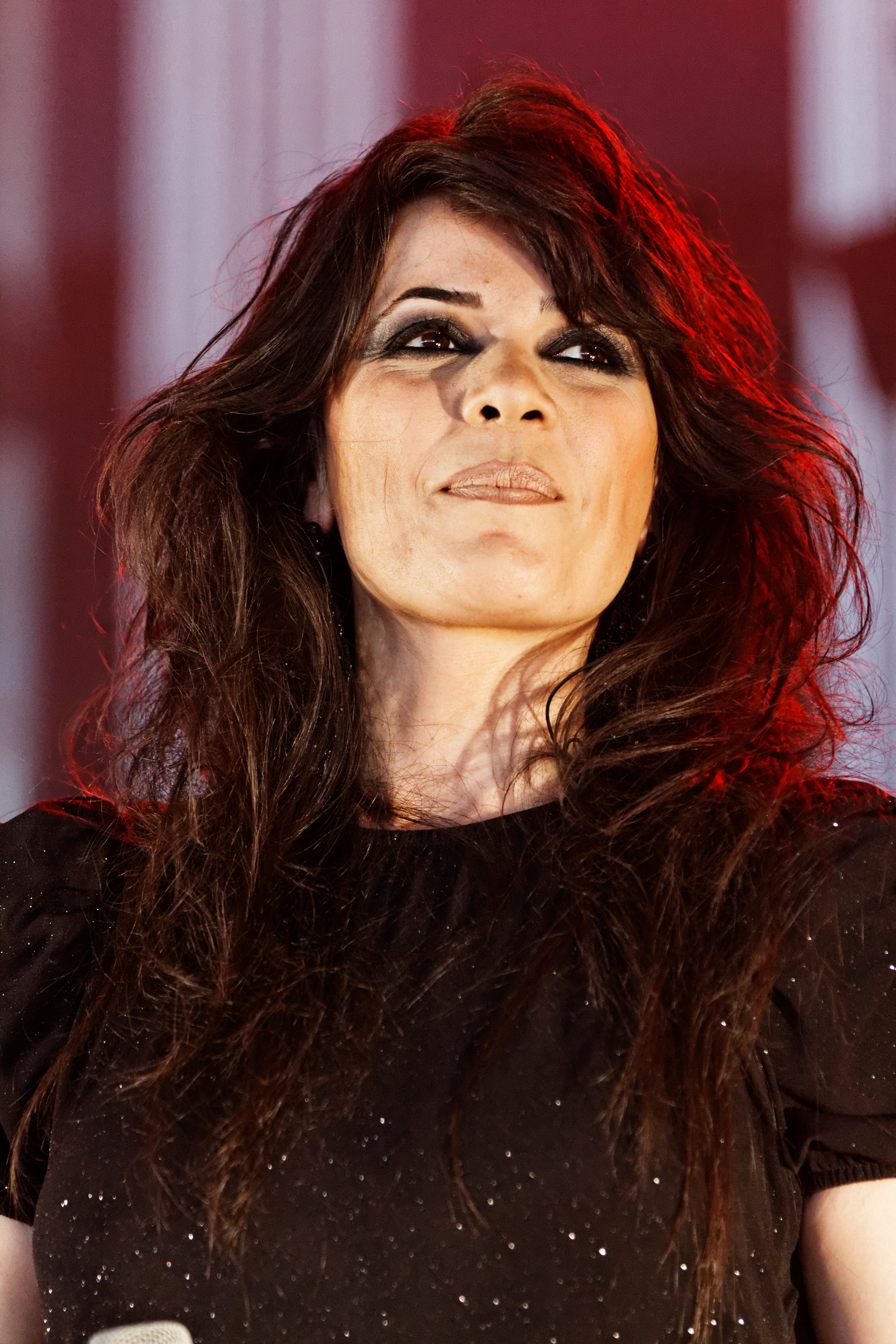
- Yasmin Levy in 2013

Background information
- Born: 23 December 1975 (age 50)
- Origin: Spain; Turkey
- Genres: Sephardic music, world, flamenco
- Occupation: Singer-songwriter
- Instrument: Vocals
- Years active: 2000–present
- Website: www.yasminlevy.com

Yasmin Levy (born 23 December 1975 in Jerusalem) is a Ladino singer-songwriter, currently based in Serbia, recognized for her interpretations of Judeo-Spanish music and her fusion of flamenco and Middle Eastern influences.

== Biography ==
Levy’s parents emigrated from Türkiye, and her music is rooted in the Judeo-Spanish traditions of Spain, performed in the Ladino language.

Her father Yitzhak Levy (1919–1977), was a composer and hazzan (cantor), as well as a pioneer researcher into the history of the Ladino music and culture of Spanish Jewry and its diaspora, being the editor of the Ladino language magazine Aki Yerushalayim. He died when Levy was just one year old, but she names him as one of her greatest musical influences.

She is a mother of two children: Michael Amir and Manuela Amir.

== Career ==
With her distinctive and emotive style, Levy has brought a new interpretation to the medieval Judeo-Spanish song by incorporating more "modern" sounds of Andalusian flamenco and traditional Turkish music, as well as combining instruments like the darbuka, oud, violin, cello, and piano.

Her debut album was Romance & Yasmin in 2000, which earned her a nomination as Best Newcomer for the fRoots / BBC Radio 3 World Music Awards 2005, followed in 2005 with her second album La Judería (Spanish: The Jewish Quarter). In 2006, she was nominated again, then in the category Culture Crossing.

On her second album, La Judería, she also covered the popular songs "Gracias a la vida" by Violeta Parra and "Nací en Álamo" from the film Vengo, directed by Tony Gatlif, which in its original version won the 2001 César Award for Best Music Written for a Film (itself being a cover of "The Song of the Gypsies" (Greek: "Το Τραγούδι των Γύφτων"), written by Greek songwriter Dionysis Tsaknis in 1990)..

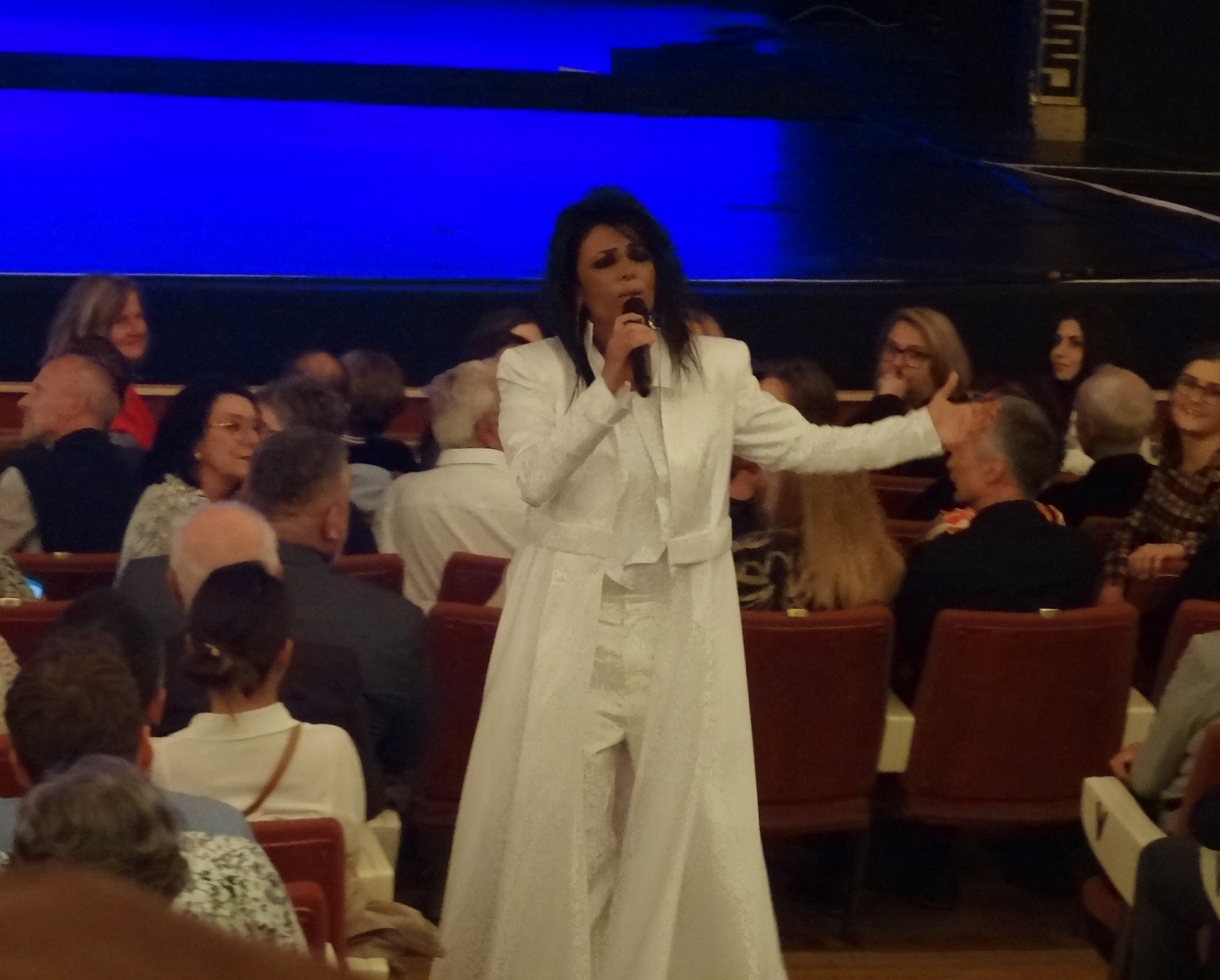
Yasmin Levy mixes with the audience at Sept. 2022 concert in Warsaw

In her own words in 2007:

"I am proud to combine the two cultures of Ladino and flamenco, while mixing in Middle Eastern influences. I am embarking on a 500-year-old musical journey, taking Ladino to Andalusia and mixing it with flamenco, the style that still bears the musical memories of the old Moorish and Jewish-Spanish world with the sound of the Arab world. In a way it is a ‘musical reconciliation’ of history."

In her own words in 2023:

“If there were no religions, music would be the religion of humanity. As a person, I believe that each of us is a different color of God, and each color has its own beauty and God sent his colors to this world through us. We are just the conduits. If we understood this, we wouldn’t hate and fight each other, if we understood, that each of us is a part of God, if we connected and loved God’s colors, our world would be beautiful and without wars. Thank God for letting me bridge people and cultures through music.“

— Yasmin Levy

In her career, Levy has given a great number of concerts all over the globe. She has already performed in Spain, Turkey, USA, the UK, Germany, France, Poland, Switzerland and many other countries. She has also entered into a variety of music collaborations during her career, such as with Egyptian singer Natacha Atlas, Turkish singer İbrahim Tatlıses and Spanish singer Concha Buika.

== Other roles ==
In 2008, she was appointed Goodwill Ambassador for Children of Peace, a UK-based charity fighting to alleviate the plight of all children caught up in the Israeli-Palestinian war.

== Accolades ==
In 2006, Levy was nominated in the "Culture Crossing" category for the fRoots / BBC Radio 3 World Music Awards.

In 2006, Levy's work earned her the Anna Lindh Euro-Mediterranean Foundation Award for promoting cross-cultural dialogue between musicians from three cultures.

Levy’s original composition, “Me Voy,” won the 2008 USA Songwriting Competition for the best world music song.

She has been nominated for the BBC World Music Award and Holland’s Edison Award (2008).

The Sunday Times named Sentir as one of the Top 100 albums of 2009, and placed it in their Top 10 World Music releases of the year.

Yasmin received the “Pomegranate Award for Music” from the American Sephardi Federation (2023).

== Discography ==
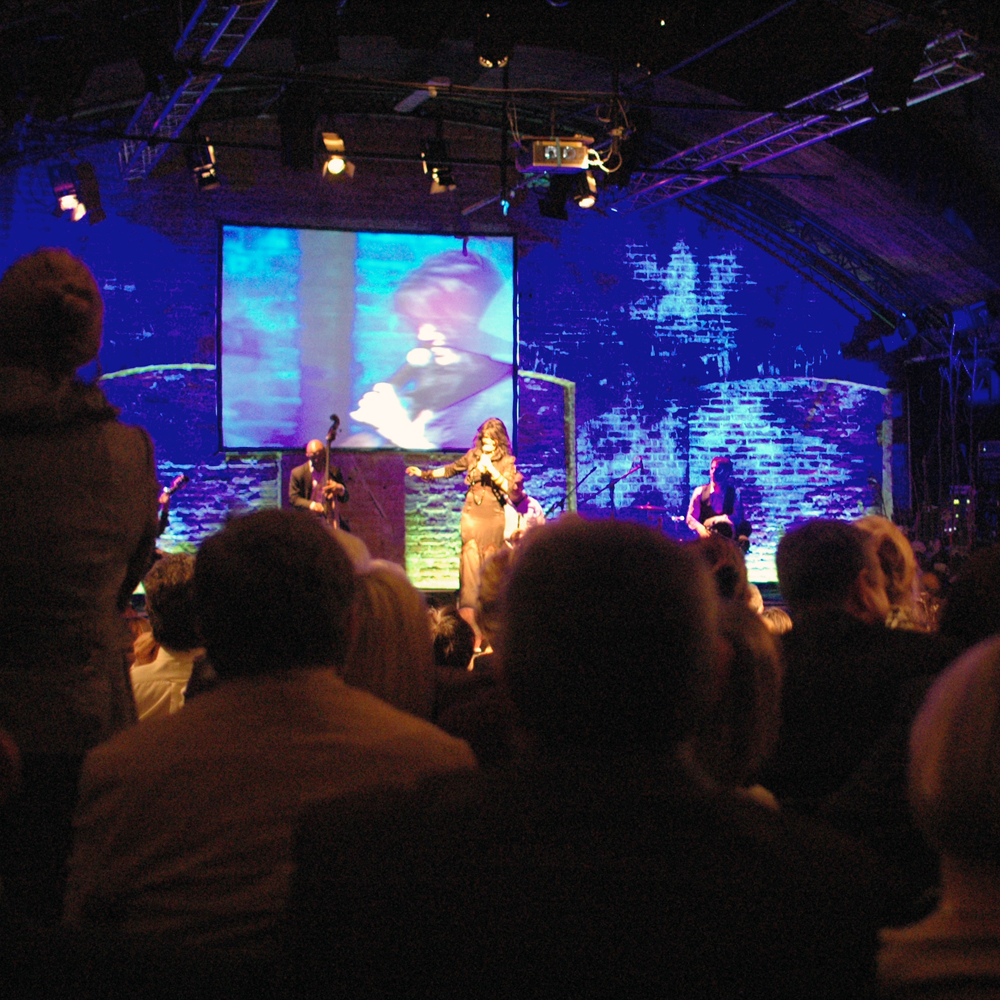
Yasmin Levy in concert in Warsaw, September 2008 (Mano Suave World Tour)

=== Full albums ===
- 2004: Romance & Yasmin
- 2005: La Judería
- 2006: Live at the Tower of David, Jerusalem
- 2007: Mano Suave
- 2009: Sentir
- 2012: Libertad
- 2014: Tango
- 2017: "Rak Od Layla Echad" ('Just one more night')
- 2021: Voice & Piano
- 2024: Mujer

=== Singles for movie soundtracks ===
- 2011: "Jaco", for My Sweet Canary (featuring the oud player Tomer Katz)
- 2011: "Una Pastora", for My Sweet Canary (featuring the qanun player Mumin Sesler)

=== Collaborations ===
- 2008: Tzur Mishelo Achalnu, for Avoda Ivrit 2, featuring Shlomo Bar
- 2010: Tzur Mishelo Achalnu, for Kol HaNeshama, featuring Shlomo Bar
- 2012: Yigdal, for Yehuda Halevi Pinat Ibn Gabirol - The Collection
