= Rita Abatzi =

Greek rebetiko musician (1914–1969)

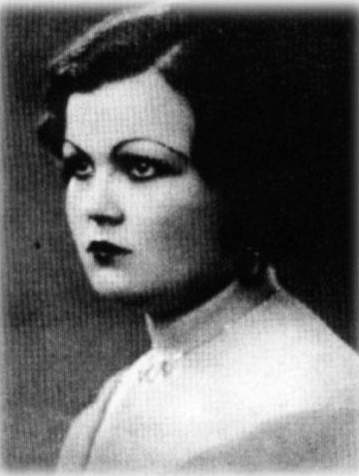
Rita Abatzi (c. 1935)

Rita Abatzi (also spelled Abadzi; Greek: Ρίτα Αμπατζή; ca. 1914 – 17 June 1969) was a Greek rebetiko musician who began her career in the first part of the 1930s.

== Biography ==
She was born in Smyrna (now İzmir), in the Aidin Vilayet of the Ottoman Empire. Some sources have given her year of birth as 1903.

A singer of rebetiko, Smyrneika, and other music, she was a popular performer on gramophone records in the 1930s. During that decade, the only female singer of rebetiko who rivalled her in popularity, and in the number of her recordings, was Roza Eskenazi.

Abatzi performed with many of the most famous musicians including Kostas Skarvelis, Spyros Peristeris, Dimitrios Semsis, Markos Vamvakaris and Vassilis Tsitsanis. Her career ended after World War II.

She died in Egaleo, Athens. Her sister, Sofia Karivali, was also a notable singer of rebetiko.

== Discography ==
Two collections dedicated to Rita Abatzi's recordings have been issued:

- Rita Abatzi 1933–1938, Heritage
- Rita Abatzi, Minos-Arkheio

Her recordings also appear on these anthologies:

- Women of Rembetika, JSP/Amazon
- Women of Rembetika 1908-1947, 4-CD collection, JSP/Amazon
