= Eve Polycarpou =

British singer

Eve Polycarpou is a British stage actress, singer and songwriter. She is best known for her roles in Mother Courage and Her Children and In the Heights.

== Early life and education ==
Eve Polycarpou was born in Brighton to Greek Cypriot parents. She is the sister of actor Peter Polycarpou. She studied at Southgate Technical College.

Polycarpou's singing style is inspired by Shirley Bassey and Vikki Carr. In 1976, Polycarpou reached the final of the British TV talent show New Faces (You're a Star, Superstar) with her stage name Eve Adam. She choose a 'less foreign' sounding stage name at the time, but said she started using her real name after seeing her brother Peter proudly using his onstage.

== Career ==
=== Theatre ===
In 1986, Polycarpou (using stage name Eve Adam) played Jenny in the National Theatre production of The Threepenny Opera, alongside Tim Curry as Macheath.

Polycarpou joined the cast of Hecuba at the Donmar Warehouse in 2004, in a new version of the tragedy by Frank McGuinness. The cast included Clare Higgins in the title role of Hecuba, Tim Piggott-Smith as Agamemnon, Alfred Burke as Talthybius, Susan Engel as the speaking chorus, Kate Fleetwood as Polyxena, Finbar Lynch as Polymestor and Eddie Redmayne as Polydorus. Polycarpou starred in the title role in Mother Courage and Her Children at The Lowry in Salford in 2013.

In 2014, Polycarpou was part of the Southwark Playhouse version of In the Heights as Abuela Claudia. The cast included David Bedella as Kevin Rosario, Victoria Hamilton-Barritt as Daniela, Sam Mackay as Usnavi de la Vega, Christina Modestou as Nina Rosario and Josie Benson as Camila Rosario. The show was directed by Luke Sheppard. In the same year, Polycarpou also joined the cast of the musical revue Jacques Brel is Alive and Well and Living in Paris at the Charing Cross Theatre. She sang Jacques Brel's famous song "Ne me quitte pas" in French as part of the show. The cast starred Gina Beck and Daniel Boys.

Polycarpou then reprised the role of Abuela Claudia in In the Heights, when the show transferred to the Kings Cross Theatre in 2015–2016. David Bedella returned to his role as Kevin Rosario, so did Sam Mackay as Usnavi and Victoria Hamilton-Barritt as Daniela. New cast members included Cleve September as Sonny de la Vega, Lily Frazer as Nina and Joe Aaron Reid as Benny.

In 2018, Polycarpou joined the cast of the musical Strictly Ballroom as Abuela for its West End run at the Piccadilly Theatre. She played the role of Drosoula in the 2019 first major adaptation of the novel Captain Corelli's Mandolin. The show opened at the Curve in Leicester, before embarking on a UK tour. The play later transferred to London's West End at the Harold Pinter Theatre for a limited summer season. In 2022, Polycarpou joined the cast of the revival of From Here to Eternity as Mrs. Kipfer, at the Charing Cross Theatre.

=== Donna & Kebab ===
In 1987, Polycarpou joined British Cypriot Martha D Lewis in a performance at the Edinburgh Festival Fringe, which led them to start a very successful collaboration as duo "Donna & Kebab". Their performances combine comedy, improvisation and original music. From 1994, they mainly focused on music and changed their name to "Donna & Kbb" and with time they became and are now known as Martha and Eve.

The duo have recorded five albums together, of which their most popular remains Donna and Kbb are Martha and Eve (1996). In 2023, the duo was back at the Edinburgh Fringe celebrating 35 years of partnership with a new show Donna & Kebab are Martha and Eve – A Celebration!, a celebration of past and present successes.

== Theatre credits ==
Year	Title	Role	Theatre
1986	The Threepenny Opera	Jenny	National Theatre
2004	Hecuba	The Singer	Donmar Warehouse
2013	Mother Courage and Her Children	Mother Courage	The Lowry, Salford
2014	In the Heights	Abuela Claudia	Southwark Playhouse
2014	Jacques Brel is Alive and Well and Living in Paris	Performer	Charing Cross Theatre
2015–2016	In the Heights	Abuela Claudia	Kings Cross Theatre
2018	Strictly Ballroom	Abuela	Piccadilly Theatre
2019	Captain Corelli's Mandolin	Drosoula	UK tour and Harold Pinter Theatre
2022	From Here to Eternity	Mrs. Kipfer	Charing Cross Theatre

== Filmography ==
Year	Title	Role	Notes
1982	Squadron	Clara	TV series (1 episode, as Eve Adam)
1983	The Fourth Arm	Simone 'Rossignol' Portales	TV series (6 episodes, as Eve Adam)
1985	The Holcroft Covenant	Manfredi's Secretary	(as Eve Adam)
1989	Forever Green	Angel	TV series (1 episode, as Eve Adam)
1991	Inspector Morse	Jocasta Georgiadis	TV series (1 episode, as Eve Adam)
1993	Birds of a Feather	Marina	TV series (1 episode, as Eve Adam)
1994	Red Eagle	Zhenya	TV movie (as Eve Adam)
1995	Backup	Cllr. Baxter	TV series (1 episode, as Eve Adam)
1998	Kiss Me Kate	Elena	TV series (1 episode)
2003	Carla	Sevasti	TV movie
2004	Jonathan Creek	Andronea	TV series (1 episode)
2004	The Brief	Helen Nicolau	TV series (1 episode)
2005	Doctor Who: the Monthly Adventures	Qel (voice)	Podcast Series
2007	The Whistleblowers	Anna Charteris	TV series (1 episode)
2007	The Bill	Malika Hassar, Eleni Giorgiou, Mrs Mehmet	TV series (4 episodes)
2018	Mamma Mia! Here We Go Again	Ensemble	
2019	McDonald's: The Gift	Busker	Video
2020	I Hate Suzie	Claudia	TV series (1 episode)
2021	Holby City	Janice Green	TV series (1 episode)
2022	Mama Wants to Go Home	Aisha	Short
2023	Silent Witness	Angela	TV series (1 episode)

== Awards ==
Year	Award	Work	Category	Result
2016	Offie	In the Heights	Best Actress	Nominated
