= Kostas Karipis =

Greek guitarist and singer

Kostas Karipis (Greek: Κώστας Καρίπης; Constantinople, Ottoman Empire, 1880 – 1952) was a Greek guitarist and singer, of the genre of rembetiko (ρεμπέτικο) in particular. It is believed that he died in 1952.
