= Dimitrios Semsis =

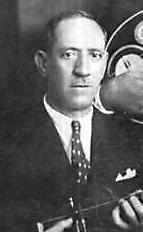
- Dimitrios Semsis

Background information
- Also known as: Dimitrios Salonikios
- Born: Δημήτριος Κουκουδέας; Dimítrios Koukoudéas; 1883; Strumica, Ottoman Empire (present day North Macedonia)
- Died: January 13, 1950 (aged 66) Athens, Greece
- Genres: Greek music, rebetiko
- Occupations: singer-songwriter, violinist
- Instruments: vocals, violin
- Years active: 1899-1950
- Formerly of: Smyrna Trio

Dimitrios Semsis, also known as Dimitrios Salonikios (Greek: Δημήτρης Σέμσης; 1883 – 13 January 1950), was a Greek violinist born Dimitrios Koukoudeas (Δημήτριος Κουκουδέας) in Strumica, in the Salonica Vilayet of the Ottoman Empire (present-day North Macedonia).

At the end of the 19th century, he joined the band of a circus, which was traveling all over the Balkans. In 1908, he married his first wife Sonhoula Bochor Hanne, and became his daughter Enriquette, cousin of Eskenazi Rosa, in the year about 1910. Later, he joined other traveling bands and played in several places, such as Turkey, Syria, Egypt, Sudan and elsewhere.

After the end of World War I, as Strumica remained in the kingdom of Serbia, Dimitrios Semsis' family moved to Thessaloniki (1919). In 1923, he married Dimitra Kanoula and, they had four children. At the beginning of 1927, he moved to Athens. By that time, he had taken the nickname "Salonikios", probably because some agents from recording companies thought that his origin was from Thessaloniki.

At the end of the 1920s, Semsis was the Recording Director of HMV and Columbia. He participated in hundreds of recordings of folk and smyrnaic songs between 1924 and 1931. He presented his first songs in 1928 and became the Director of Arts of His Master's Voice in 1931 until his death. He composed over 100 songs.

In the 1930s, Dimitrios was recording with Roza Eskenazi, with great success. He often accompanied her to the taverns with Tompoulis, Lampros Savvaidis, and Lampros Leonaridis. His compositions were being recorded by the greatest artists of that time, such as Rita Ampatzi, Stelios Perpiniadis, and Stratos Pagioumtzis. He composed folk, smyrnaic, and amane songs.

Dimitrios Semsis recorded hundreds of discs and plenty of them are re-released nowadays. In 1972, in an interview, Roza Eskenazi said that Dimitrios was playing "the best violin in the world".

After a short period of illness, he died of cancer in Athens on 13 January 1950.
