= Stelios Perpiniadis =

Stelios Perpiniadis (Greek: Στέλιος Περπινιάδης; 14 May 1899 – 4 September 1977), better known as Stellakis (Greek: Στελλάκης), was a Greek folk musician who wrote, sang, and played guitar in the rebetiko style. He was the father of Greek folk musician, Vangelis Perpiniadis.

== Biography ==
Perpiniadis was born in Tinos, the youngest of eleven children, of whom only three survived. As a child his family moved to Alexandria in 1900 and then Constantinople in 1906. He served in the Greek army in 1919, which had landed in Smyrna at the time. He and his family left for Greece as part of the Asia Minor Catastrophe in 1922. In 1923 he moved to Piraeus, where he came into contact with rebetiko musicians from Asia Minor. At the encouragement of musician Manolis Margaronis, he began performing in 1925. He worked together with other well-known rebetiko musicians such as Vassilis Tsitsanis, and recorded duets with well-known singers such as Rosa Eskenazi, Marika Ninou, Ioanna Georgakopoulou, and Dimitris Perdikopoulos. He died in Athens.
