= Roza Eskenazi =

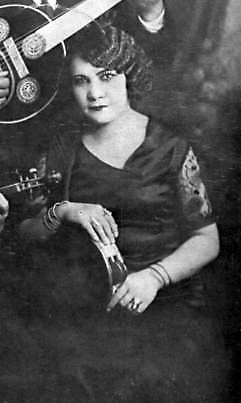
- Eskenazi in 1932

Background information
- Also known as: The Queen of Rebetiko
- Born: Sarah Skinazi c. 1895; Constantinople, Constantinople Vilayet, Ottoman Empire (modern-day Istanbul, Turkey)
- Origin: Constantinople, Ottoman Empire
- Died: December 2, 1980 (aged ~85) Athens, Greece
- Genres: Rebetiko (Smyrneiko); Amanes
- Occupation: Singer
- Years active: 1920s – 1977
- Formerly of: Agapios Tomboulis; Smyrna Trio

Roza Eskenazi (Greek: Ρόζα Εσκενάζυ; c. 1895 – 2 December 1980) was a Constantinople-born Greek dancer and singer of rebetiko, Greek folk music, Kanto and Turkish folk music. She was known as the "Queen of Rebetiko".

She made her first recordings in 1929 and achieved instant success and is credited with bringing rebetiko to a mainstream audience. She recorded over 500 songs over the next decade and was one of few Greek artists to be flown to the United States, where she recorded material under Columbia Records. She sang in Greek, Turkish, Armenian, Arabic, Yiddish, Ladino and Italian.

As she was born to Sephardic Jewish parents, she faced deportation to Auschwitz concentration camp during the Second World War. Most of the Greek Jewish community perished in Auschwitz. Eskenazi was jailed for three months in Greece, only narrowly escaping deportation. She clandestinely housed British agents and members of the resistance in her Athens home and saved the lives of many from the Jewish community.

In the 1950s, she toured the United States twice, with one visit lasting 9 months. She also returned to Turkey to perform. Her career later declined, but there was a revival of interest in her music in the 1970s. In this period, she appeared more frequently on Greek television and gave live performances, giving a final concert in 1977. She suffered from Alzheimer's disease in her final years, and died in 1980.

In 1991, Greek writer, Dinos Christianopoulos wrote a short story about her, titled "Roza Eskenazi". In 2011, Israeli filmmaker, Roy Sher released a documentary about Eskenazi, My Sweet Canary. The film premiered at the Thessaloniki Documentary Festival and has since been screened at several Greek film festivals around the world.

== Life and career ==
=== Early life ===
Eskenazi was born Roza Sarah Skinazi (Ροζα Σάρα Σκιναζί) to an impoverished Sephardic Jewish family in Istanbul, in the Constantinople Vilayet of the Ottoman Empire. Throughout her career she hid her real date of birth, and claimed to have been born in 1910. In fact, she was at least a decade older, and was likely born sometime between 1895 and 1897. Her father, Avram Skinazi, owned a storage facility. In addition to Roza, he and his wife Flora had another daughter and two sons, Nisim, the eldest, and Sami.

Shortly after the turn of the century, the Skinazi family relocated to Thessaloniki, then still under Ottoman rule. The city was undergoing rapid economic expansion at the time, with its population growing by 70 percent between 1870 and 1917. Avram Skinazi found work in a cotton processing mill and took various odd jobs to improve his family's financial standing. At the time, he entrusted young Sarah to a neighboring girl, who tutored several local children in basic reading and writing. She didn't attend school.

For some time, Sarah, her brother, and her mother lived in nearby Komotini. Roza's mother found employment there as the live-in maid for a wealthy family, and Roza assisted her with the housework. One day, Sarah was overheard singing by the Turkish owners of a local tavern. They were enthralled by her voice, and immediately came to the door to express their wish to hire the girl to perform in their club. Sarah's mother was incensed at the suggestion that her daughter, or any other member of her family, would become an artiste. Years later, in an interview, Roza admitted that her time in Komotini was a turning point in her life. It was there, she said, that she decided to become a singer and dancer.

After the Second World War, Eskenazi's brother, Nissim, made Aliyah to Israel.

=== Career beginnings ===
She was not to realize her dream until her return to Thessaloniki. At the time, the family was renting an apartment near the city's Grand Hotel Theater, and several of the neighbors performed there. Every day, Sarah would help two of the dancers carry their costumes to the theater, hoping that she would one day appear on the stage alongside them. It was there that she finally began her career as a dancer. While still a teenager, she fell in love with Yiannis Zardinidis, a wealthy man from one of Cappadocia's most prominent families. Zardinidis' family disapproved of the match, considering her to be of loose moral character. Nevertheless, the two of them eloped around 1913, and Sarah changed her name to Roza, the name by which she was known throughout her career.

Zardinidis died of unknown causes around the year 1917, leaving Eskenazi with a son, Paraschos. Realizing that she could not maintain her career as a performer while raising an infant, she brought him to the St. Taksiarchis nursery in the city of Xanthi. His father's family agreed to raise him, and Paraschos Zardinidis eventually grew up to be a high-ranking officer in the Greek Air Force. It was only years later that he finally reunited with his mother, after finding her in Athens in 1935.

=== Athens ===
Roza had moved to Athens shortly after Zardinidis's death to pursue her musical career. She quickly teamed up with two Armenian cabaret artists, Seramous and Zabel, who reportedly liked her because she could speak Turkish, and because she showed talent as a singer. Though she continued to perform as a dancer, she began to sing for patrons of the club in Greek, Turkish, and Armenian. It was there that she was first "discovered" by well-known composer and impresario Panagiotis Toundas in the late 1920s. Toundas immediately recognized her talent and introduced her to Vassilis Toumbakaris of Columbia Records.

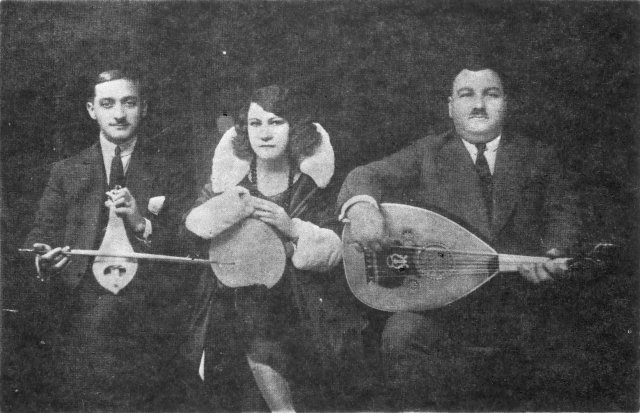
K. Lambros, R. Eskenazi, A. Tomboulis (Athens, circa 1930)

In 1929, Roza cut four sides for Columbia, three of which were amanedes (Tzivaeri, Minore, and Matzore) and one demotic (Emorfi Pou Ein I Leivadia). By the mid-1930s, she had recorded over 300 songs for Columbia and HMV, and had become one of their most popular stars. Some were folk songs, especially from Greece and Smyrna (İzmir) in Turkey. Her most important contribution to the local music scene, however, was her recordings of rebetiko and especially the Smyrna school of rebetiko. She was credited with being largely responsible for the breakthrough of this style into popular culture.

Soon after she began recording, Roza began performing nightly at the Taygetos nightclub in Athens as well. Appearing with her on stage were Toundas, the violinist Dimitrios Semsis and oud player Agapios Tomboulis. Eskenazi, however was the star of the show, earning an unprecedented 200 drachmas per night. She later confided to her biographer Kostas Hatzidoulis that she should have been much wealthier, just on the income from the show, but that she had a weakness for expensive jewelry and spent too much of her income on it.

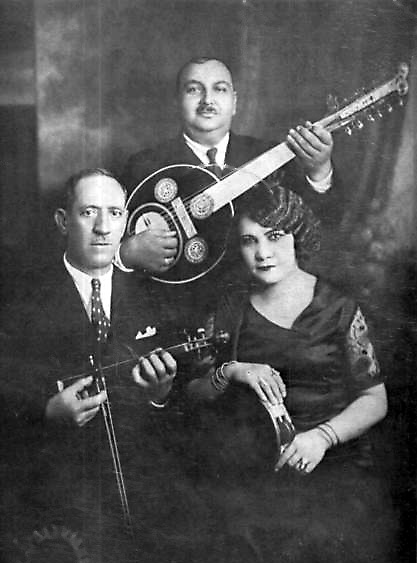
D. Semsis, A. Tomboulis, R. Eskenazi (Athens, 1932)

=== International breakthrough ===
Before long, her career extended beyond the political boundaries of Greece to the Greek Diaspora. Together with Tomboulis, she traveled to Egypt, Albania, and Serbia, receiving a warm reception not only from the local Greek communities, but from the Turkish communities as well. Her music had a certain edginess to it, and one of her songs, Πρέζα όταν Πιείς ("When You Take Heroin"), was even censored by Greek dictator Ioannis Metaxas. As a result of his decisions, many other traditional Rebetiko artists were marginalized, though a new trend in the genre, led by Vassilis Tsitsanis, was gaining ground.

=== Second World War ===
Within a short time, however, Greece's own independence would be challenged. By 1940, Italy invaded, and in 1941 the German army occupied the country. Despite the repressive regime, she continued performing, and in 1942, she even opened up her own nightclub, Krystal, together with her son Paraschos, with whom she had since been reunited.

As a Jew, she was in danger, as Adolf Eichmann had arrived in Greece in 1943 to oversee the deportation of Jews from Athens and Thessaloniki to concentration camps. Some Athenian Jews were able to blend in with the local Greek Orthodox community and evade deportation. Angelos Evert, Police Chief of Athens, issued false papers to Jews with Greek names, with affidavits confirming that they are Greek Orthodox Christians. Eskenazi was one of one-thousand local Greek Jews to receive such a document and assured her safety through an affair with a German officer.

She used her privileged position to support the local resistance, and hid resistance fighters and even English agents in her home. She was also able to rescue Jews in both Athens and Thessaloniki. Among those she saved from deportation to Auschwitz was her own family. By 1943, her cover finally crumbled, and Eskenazi was arrested. She spent three months in jail before a concerted effort by her German lover and her son succeeded in getting her released. She spent the rest of the war in hiding, fearful that she might be arrested again.

=== Post-war period ===
Throughout her long career, Roza developed good relations with Columbia Records Vassilis Toumbakaris and Minos Matsas, who had recently founded Odeon/Parlophone. This enabled her to promote the careers of many other well-known artists, including Marika Ninou. She introduced them to the Allilovoithia musicians union, and within a short time, they were recording with Vassilis Tsitsanis.

In 1949, Roza returned to Patras to obtain a new ID card. She also gace concerts and started up a relationship with Christos Philipakopoulos, a young police officer who was thirty years her junior.

Although Roza had toured extensively throughout the Balkans, it was only in 1952 that she made her first tour of the United States to perform for the Greek and Turkish Diasporas there. The trip was sponsored by the Parthenon Restaurant and Bar in New York City and lasted several months. This was the first of several musical tours overseas. In 1955, Albanian impresario Ayden Leskoviku of the Balkan Record Company invited her to perform and record in Istanbul, where she was born. She eventually recorded about forty songs for Leskoviku and received about $5,000 for them. Although this was a relatively paltry sum, she later claimed that her performance fees and tips were ten times that amount.

Soon after Istanbul she embarked on two more tours of the United States, and performed in New York, Detroit, and Chicago. On 5 July 1958, she married Frank Alexander during her second trip to the U.S. The wedding seemed to have been in name only. This was necessary for her to get a work permit in the U.S. Nevertheless, Eskenazi loved America and would have emigrated there were it not for her other love, Christos Philipakopoulos. She returned to Athens in 1959 so that she could be with him. She bought the two of them a large house in Kipoupoli with the money that she earned in the States, as well as two trucks and some horses. She and Philipakopoulos would live in that home for the rest of her life.

=== Decline and rediscovery ===
Eskenazi was now in her sixties, and the music scene in Greece had changed considerably since she launched her career over four decades earlier. Smyrneiko (the music of İzmir) and Rebetiko had declined in popularity, and she, as well as other masters of the genre, were relegated to occasional appearances at village festivals and other small events. Though she did record a few songs over the coming years, these were mainly covers of her older, well-known hits, made for minor recording companies in Athens.

It was only in the late 1960s that there was some renewed interest in her earlier work. RCA recorded two 45s containing four of her songs (including "Sabah Amanes") with violinist Dimitris Manisalis, but the release was limited. All this changed, however, in the final days of the military dictatorship in the early 1970. Suddenly, the youth of the country developed a renewed interest in the urban songs of the past, and several important compilations were released. One of the best known was Rebetiki Istoria, a six-record collection of Rebetiko music, which sold hundreds of thousands of copies.

What set this decade apart from her earlier career was the widespread appearance of television. Roza quickly adapted to the new medium and appeared on a number of shows. In 1973, she was documented in the short film To Bouzouki (directed by Vassilis Maros) and in 1976 she did a TV special with Haris Alexiou, which included interviews and songs, as well as a couple more appearances. Throughout that time, however, Roza never abandoned her roots in the country's nightclubs, and she did a weekly live show in Themelio, a nightclub in Plaka.

As one of the few surviving Rebetiko singers who remained active at the time, artists and musicologists began studying her style, which was deemed "authentic". This had a lasting impact on a new generation of performers including Haris Alexiou (with whom she appeared on television) and Glykeria. While musicians and academics were intrigued by her abilities, as well as by her insights into a lost musical world, the general public was less enthusiastic, and considered her more of a curiosity. Nevertheless, she continued to perform, giving her last show in September 1977, when she was at least 80 years old, in Patras.

== Final years ==
Eskenazi spent her final years in quiet solitude, at her home in Kipoupoli, together with Christos Philipakopoulos. Although she was born Jewish, she converted to the Greek Orthodox faith in 1976, and was renamed Rozalia Eskenazi. Within two years, she began to show symptoms of Alzheimer's disease and would occasionally get lost as she made her way home. In the summer of 1980, she slipped at home and broke her hip. She was hospitalised for three months. She returned home briefly, but was soon back in a private clinic due to an infection. She died there on December 2, 1980. Roza Eskenazi was buried in an unmarked grave in the village of Stomio in Korinthia. In 2008, the village's cultural committee raised enough money to erect a simple tombstone, with the inscription, "Roza Eskenazi, Artist".

== Legacy ==
In 1982, two years after her death, Kostas Hatzidoulis published a brief memoir entitled Αυτά που Θυμάμαι ("The Things I Remember"), based on interviews Eskenazi gave later in life. Included in the book was a vast collection of photographs, especially of Roza early in her career.

In 1991, Greek writer, Dinos Christianopoulos wrote a short story about her, titled "Roza Eskenazi". In 1996, it was republished in Haaretz in Israel, in a Hebrew translation by Amir Zuckerman.

In 2008, Israeli filmmaker Roy Sher of Sher Productions began work on a musical documentary named My Sweet Canary, based on the life and career of Roza Eskenazi. The film, an international coproduction, follows three young musicians from Greece, Turkey, and Israel, who embark on a journey in search of Greece's best-known and best-loved Rebetiko artist. The film was released in 2011.

In 2011, an evening was dedicated to her repertoire at the Jerusalem International Oud Festival in Israel.

In 2025, she was commemorated by the Jewish Culture Festival in Kraków, with pieces from her repertoire performed by Hungarian singer Veronika Varga and the Greek oud player Andreas Andreou.

== Discography ==
Eskenazi may be heard on many of the anthology CDs listed in the rebetiko discography. CDs of her own, which may be available in English-language countries include:

- Rosa Eskenazi Rembetissa 1933-1936 Rounder Select, 1996.
