= Daizy Stavropoulou =

Greek rebetiko singer

Daizy Stavropoulou (Greek: Νταίζη Σταυροπούλου; also transliterated Daisy Stavropoulou, Daizi Stavropoulou; c. 1912 – 1994) was a Greek rebetiko singer active approximately 1940-1946.

== Biography ==
Daizy Stavropoulou was born in Argos, Greece in the early 1910s (some sources list her birth year as 1912) to a farming family. In 1933, she went to Athens where she met Anestis Delias (Greek: Ανέστης Δελιάς), one of four members of the well known Quartet of Piraeus. She began attending Delias' rehearsals at this time.

In 1938 Stavropoulou went to Thessaloniki where she met Vassilis Tsitsanis. She recorded her first songs, compositions by Tsitsanis, with him the following year: "Fina tha tin pername" (Columbia record DG-6547), "Mikri mikri s' agapisa" and "Sklirokardhi" (HMV record AO 2637). Back in Athens, Stavropoulou proceeded to record compositions by Tountas, Skarvelis, Kosmadopoulos, Keromitis, Chrysinis, Baxivanopoulos until the German occupation of Greece resulted in the closure of the record production factory in 1941.

In 1946, after the German occupation, she recorded two compositions by Vasilis Tsitsanis: "Mazi mou den salafis" and "Ston Agios Konstantinos" (Columbia record DG-6617). In 1946, Stavropoulou married, and her husband disallowed her from singing on records. She severed her exclusive contract with Columbia records and stopped recording until her death in 1994 in Athens.

== Discography ==
1940-1941 (Pre-occupation)

- Arhontopoulia mou (Greek: Αρχοντοπούλα μου) (Columbia Record DG-6565 / 1940 Composed by: Kosmas Kosmadopoulos, Sung by: Daizi Stavropoulou & Manolis Chiotis, Lyrics by: Panos Tountas)
- Afou m'aresi na girno (Greek: Αφού μ’ αρέσει να γυρνώ) (Record HMV AO-2655 / 1940 Composed by: Vasilis Tsitsanis, Lyricist: Daizi Stavropoulou)
- Dhio hronia me kolakeves (Greek: Δυο χρόνια με κολάκευες) (Columbia Record DG-6567 / 1940 Composed by: Kostas Skarvelis, Lyrics by: Daizi Stavropoulou & Manolis Chiotis)
- Eisai san neraidha (Greek: Είσαι σαν νεράιδα) (Record HMV AO-2655 / 1940 Composed by: Tabakis, Lyrics by: Daizi Stavropoulou & Char. Mavridis)
- I Marika i mavroforma (Greek: Η Μαρίκα η μαυροφόρα) (Record HMV AO-2701 / 1940 Composed by: Ar. Baxivanopoulos, Lyricist: Daizi Stavropoulou & Manolis Chiotis)
- I Marika i mavroforma (Greek: Η Μαρίκα η μαυροφόρα) (Record HMV AO-2693 / 1940 Composed by: Ar. Baxivanopoulos, Lyrics by: Daizi Stavropoulou & Manolis Chiotis)
- Tha vro mian alli me kardia (Greek: Θα βρω μιαν άλλη με καρδιά) (Record HMV AO-2666 / 1940 Composed by: Vasilis Tsitsanis, Lyricist: Daizi Stavropoulou)
- Tha pao na ziso sta Vouna (Greek: Θα πάω να ζήσω στα βουνά) (Columbia Record DG-6592 / 1940 Composed by: G. Palamas, Lyrics by: Daizi Stavropoulou & Char. Mavridis)
- Tha protimiso thanato (Greek: Θα προτιμήσω θάνατο) (Record HMV AO-2645 / 1940 Composed by: Vasilis Tsitsanis, Lyrics by: Daizi Stavropoulou & Char. Mavridis)
- Katholou dhen to skepstikes (Greek: Καθόλου δεν το σκέφτηκες) (Disc HMV AO-2690 Composed by: Tabakis, Lyrics by: Daizi Stavropoulou, Lyrics by: V. Mavrofrydis)
- Kapoia mirki (Greek: Κάποια μικρή) (Record HMV AO-2693 / 1940 Composed by: Ar. Baxivanopoulos, Lyrics by: Daizi Stavropoulou & Manolis Chiotis)
- Marinaki (Greek: Μαρινάκι) (Record HMV AO-2665 / 1940 Composed by: Panos Tountas, Lyricist: Daizi Stavropoulou)
- Me berdhepsan ta matia sou (Greek: Με μπέρδεψαν τα μάτια σου) (Record HMV AO-2677 / 1940 Composed by: D. Semsis (Thessaloniki), Lyrics by: Daizi Stavropoulou & P. Stylianidis[2], Lyrics by: Stellakis Perpiniadis)
- Mikri mikri s'agapisa (Greek: Μικρή μικρή σ’ αγάπησα) (Record HMV AO-2637 / 1940 Composed by: Vasilis Tsitsanis, Lyrics by: Daizi Stavropoulou & Vasilis Tsitsanis)
- Mikropantremanaki mou (Greek: Μικροπαντρεμενάκι μου) (Columbia Record DG-6565 / 1940 Composed by: St. Drosos, Lyrics by: Daizi Stavropoulou & Manolis Chiotis)
- Peiraia mou s'afino geia (Greek: Πειραία μου σ’ αφήνω γεια) (Record HMV AO-2696 / 1940 Composed by: Stelios Chrysinis, Lyrics by: Daizi Stavropoulou)
- Pes to nai kai dhen tha haseis (Greek: Πες το ναι και δεν θα χάσεις) Say yes and you won't lose (Columbia Record DG-6567 / 1940 Composed by: Kostas Skarvelis, Lyrics by: Daizi Stavropoulou & Manolis Chiotis)
- Sklirokardhi (Greek: Σκληρόκαρδη) (Record HMV AO-2637 / 1940 Composed by: Vassilis Tsitsanis, Lyrics by: Daizi Stavropoulou & Vassilis Tsitsanis)
- Sta nisia tou Paradheisou (Greek: Στα νησιά του Παραδείσου) In the Islands of Paradise (Record HMV AO-2666 / 1940 Composed by Kosm. Kosmadopoulos, Lyrics by Daizi Stavropoulou, Lyrics by V. Tamvakis)
- Ta Pantremenadhika (Greek: Τα Παντρεμενάδικα) The Wedding Songs (Record HMV AO-2645 / 1940 Composed by: Vasilis Tsitsanis, Lyrics by: Daizi Stavropoulou & Vasilis Tsitsanis)
- To votani tis kardhias (Greek: Το βοτάνι της καρδιάς) The Herb of the Heart (Record HMV AO-2701 / 1940 Composed by: Ar. Baxivanopoulos, Lyrics by: Daizi Stavropoulou & Manolis Chiotis)[3]
- Fina tha tin pername (Greek: Το βοτάνι της καρδιάς) (Columbia Record DG-6547 / 1940 Composed by: Vassilis Tsitsanis, Lyrics by: Daizi Stavropoulou & Vassilis Tsitsanis)
- Horis elpidha na pono (Greek: Χωρίς ελπίδα να πονώ) (Record HMV AO-2677 / 1940 Composed by: Stelios Keromytis, Lyrics by: Daizi Stavropoulou & Stelios Keromytis)
- I loghi mas to theli (Greek: Η λόγχη μας το θέλει) (Columbia Record DG-6584 / 1941 Composed by: Panos Tountas, Lyrics by: Stelios Keromytis & Manolis Chiotis & Daizi Stavropoulou)
- Tha paro to doufeki (Greek: Θα πάρω το ντουφέκι μου) (Columbia Record DG-6584 / 1941 Composed by: Stelios Keromytis, Lyrics by: Stelios Keromytis & Daizi Stavropoulou & Manolis Chiotis)

1946 (Post-occupation)

- Mazi mou dhen tairiazies (Greek: Μαζί μου δεν ταιριάζεις)(Columbia Record DG-6617 / 1946 Composed by: Vasilis Tsitsanis, Lyricist: Daizi Stavropoulou)
- Ston Agio Konstantino (Greek: Στον Άγιο Κωνσταντίνο) (Columbia Record DG-6617 / 1946 Composed by: Vasilis Tsitsanis, Lyrics by: Daizi Stavropoulou & Vasilis Tsitsanis)
